= 2019–20 Lee Man FC season =

Lee Man 2019–20 season
- President: Norman Lee
- Head Coach: Chan Hiu Ming
- Stadium: Sham Shui Po Sports Ground
- Premier League: 4th
- Senior Shield: Runners-up
- FA Cup: First round
- Sapling Cup: Group stage
- Top goalscorer: League: Michaël N'dri (10); All: Michaël N'dri (18)
- Highest home attendance: 1,256 (vs Eastern, 22 December 2019)
- Lowest home attendance: 425 (vs Rangers, 20 October 2019)
Home colours	Away colours

The 2019–20 season is Lee Man's 3rd consecutive season in Hong Kong Premier League, the top-tier division in Hong Kong football. Lee Man will compete in the Premier League, Senior Challenge Shield, FA Cup and Sapling Cup this season. Despite their roots in Tseung Kwan O, the club plays its home matches at Sham Shui Po Sports Ground.

== Squad ==
=== Current squad ===
As of 21 September 2020

Note: Flags indicate national team as defined under FIFA eligibility rules; some limited exceptions apply. Players may hold more than one non-FIFA nationality.

No.	Pos.	Nation	Player
1	GK	HKG	Ko Chun Wilson
2	DF	HKG	Fernando Recio (captain)
5	DF	HKG	Yu Wai Lim
6	MF	HKG	Wong Ho Chun
7	MF	HKG	Lee Hong Lim
8	FW	HKG	Jordi Tarrés
9	FW	FRA	Michaël N'dri ^{FP}
10	MF	ARG	Jonathan Acosta ^{FP}
11	FW	HKG	Cheng Siu Kwan
12	MF	HKG	Law Cheuk Hei
14	DF	HKG	Tsang Ka Chun
16	MF	HKG	Ngan Lok Fung
17	MF	HKG	Marcus Chang
18	DF	HKG	Wong Yim Kwan

No.	Pos.	Nation	Player
21	MF	POR	Bruno Pinheiro ^{FP}
23	MF	HKG	Tang Hong Yin
26	MF	HKG	Wong Chun Ho
27	DF	HKG	Chan Hin Kwong
28	GK	HKG	Chan Ka Ho
29	DF	HKG	Yu Pui Hong
33	DF	HKG	Chau Hin Shing
44	FW	HKG	Yuto Nakamura
66	DF	HKG	Tam Lok Hin
77	MF	UKR	Serhiy Shapoval ^{FP}
88	GK	HKG	Yuen Ho Chun
91	FW	BRA	Gil ^{FP}
92	FW	MAC	Leong Ka Hang ^{LP}
--	DF	HKG	Tsang Kam To

Players' positions as per club's announcement. Remarks:
^{LP} These players are considered as local players in Hong Kong domestic football competitions.
^{FP} These players are registered as foreign players.

== Transfers ==
=== Transfers in ===
Date from	Position	Nationality	Name	From	Fee	Ref.
19 July 2019	DF	(Hong Kong)	Fernando Recio	Kitchee	Free	
19 July 2019	MF	(Hong Kong)	Lee Hong Lim	Eastern	Free	
19 July 2019	FW	(Hong Kong)	Jordi Tarrés	Kitchee	Free	
19 July 2019	MF	(Argentina)	Jonatan Acosta	Dreams FC	Free	
19 July 2019	MF	(Hong Kong)	Tang Hong Yin	Free agent	Free	
19 July 2019	DF	(Brazil)	Diogo Rangel	(Brazil) Sampaio Corrêa	Free	
19 July 2019	DF	(Hong Kong)	Chau Hin Shing	Kitchee	Free	
19 July 2019	GK	(Hong Kong)	Li Hon Ho	Tai Po	Free	
19 July 2019	FW	(Brazil)	Gil	(Brazil) Treze	Free	
November 2019	DF	(Hong Kong)	Tsang Ka Chun	Youth team	Free	
January 2020	DF	(Hong Kong)	Law Cheuk Hei	Youth team	Free	
21 January 2020	DF	(Portugal)	Bruno Pinheiro	(Thailand) Army United	Free	
4 June 2020	MF	(Hong Kong)	Yuto Nakamura	Kitchee	Free	
4 June 2020	DF	(Hong Kong)	Tsang Kam To	Eastern	Free	
3 July 2020	MF	(Hong Kong)	Wong Chun Ho	Pegasus	Free	
3 July 2020	MF	(Hong Kong)	Chang Hei Yin	Pegasus	Free	
3 July 2020	MF	(Hong Kong)	Wong Ho Chun	South China	Free	
3 September 2020	DF	(Hong Kong)	Chan Hin Kwong		Free	
3 September 2020	MF	(Hong Kong)	Tam Lok Hin		Free	

=== Transfers out ===
Date from	Position	Nationality	Name	To	Fee	Ref.
1 July 2019	GK	(Hong Kong)	Pang Tsz Kin	Retired	Released	
1 July 2019	DF	(Chinese Taipei)	Chen Ting-yang	(Chinese Taipei) Taichung Futuro	Released	
1 July 2019	DF	(Hong Kong)	Fong Pak Lun	R&F	Released	
1 July 2019	MF	(South Korea)	Baek Ji-hoon	Unattached	Released	
1 July 2019	MF	(Hong Kong)	Law Chun Yan	Resources Capital	Released	
1 July 2019	MF	(Brazil)	Zé Victor	Unattached	Released	
1 July 2019	FW	(Brazil)	Stefan	Citizen	Released	
1 July 2019	FW	(Hong Kong)	Hui Ka Lok	Tai Po	Released	
1 July 2019	FW	(Hong Kong)	Lai Yiu Cheong	Icanfield	Released	
6 July 2019	DF	(Spain)	Fran González	(India) Mohun Bagan	Released	
21 January 2020	DF	(Brazil)	Diogo Rangel	Unattached	Released	
1 June 2020	GK	(Hong Kong)	Li Hon Ho	Retired	Released	
1 June 2020	DF	(Hong Kong)	Chan Hin Kwong		Released	
1 June 2020	MF	(Hong Kong)	Chan Ming Kong		Released	
1 June 2020	MF	(Hong Kong)	Wong Chun Hin		Released	
1 June 2020	MF	(Hong Kong)	Tam Lok Hin		Released	
1 June 2020	MF	(Hong Kong)	Chow Ka Lok	Rangers	Released	

=== Loans in ===
Start Date	End Date	Position	Nationality	No	Name	From Club	Fee	Ref.
19 July 2019	1 June 2020	DF	(Hong Kong)	22	Tse Long Hin	Eastern	Undisclosed	
1 September 2019	1 June 2020	DF	(Hong Kong)	4	Lau Hok Ming	Eastern	Undisclosed	
3 July 2020	End of season	GK	(Hong Kong)	27	Chan Ka Ho	Kitchee	Undisclosed	

== Club officials ==
- Owner: Lee & Man Chemical
- Chairperson: Norman Lee
- Vice Chairperson: Kwok Ching Yee
- Director: Lam Chak Yu
- Head Coach: Chan Hiu Ming
- Assistant coach: Tsang Chiu Tat
- Technical Director: Chan Hung Ping
- Academy Director: Law Kwok Ho
- First-team goalkeeping coach: Cheng Ho Man
- Fitness coach: Choi Chan In
- Performance analysts: Kwok Chun Lam, Yeung Lok Man

== Friendlies ==
=== Pre-season ===
Win Draw Loss

3 August 2019 Friendly	Lee Man	1–0	Southern	Tseung Kwan O
(UTC+8)	Jordi 72'			Stadium: Jockey Club HKFA Football Training Centre

10 August 2019 Friendly	Lee Man	2–2	Yuen Long	Tseung Kwan O
16:00 (UTC+8)	Cheng Siu Kwan; Gil		Tsang Tsz Hin; Katê	Stadium: Jockey Club HKFA Football Training Centre

24 August 2019 Friendly	Eastern	3–1	Lee Man	Tseung Kwan O
	Everton; Jean Moser		Diogo	Stadium: Jockey Club HKFA Football Training Centre

== Matches ==
=== Table ===
Pos	Team	Pld	W	D	L	GF	GA	GD	Pts	Qualification or relegation
2	Eastern	10	6	1	3	16	8	+8	19	Qualification for AFC Cup group stage
3	(China) R&F (D)	10	5	3	2	21	15	+6	18	Withdrew from league system, club folded (Note: R&F withdrew from the league system after the end of the season and folded.)
4	Lee Man	10	5	1	4	16	14	+2	16	Qualification for AFC Cup group stage
5	Southern	10	2	4	4	15	21	−6	10	
6	Happy Valley	10	0	1	9	6	31	−25	1	

Source: Hong Kong Football Association
Rules for classification: 1) Points; 2) Head-to-head points; 3) Head-to-head goal difference; 4) Head-to-head goals scored; 5) Goal difference; 6) Goals scored; 7) Fair-play points; 8) Drawing lots (Play-off if the winner has to be decided).
(D) Disqualified

=== Hong Kong Premier League ===
On 14 August 2019, the fixtures for the forthcoming season were announced.

Win Draw Loss

==== Results by round ====
Round	1	2	3	4	5	6	7	8	9	10	11	12	13	14	15	16	17	18
Ground	H	H	H	A	H	A	A	H	H	A	A	A	H	A	A	H	H	A
Result	W	D	W		W	L	W	W	W	L			W	L		L		W
Position	3	2	2		3	4	3	3	2	4			1	4		4		4

Updated to match(es) played on 15 September 2019. Source: Competitive Matches
A = Away; H = Home; W = Win; D = Draw; L = Loss

1 September 2019 1	Lee Man	4–2	Pegasus	Sham Shui Po
14:30 (UTC+8)	Recio 36'; N'dri 45', 56', 90+2', (yellow card) 90+1'; Shapoval (yellow card) 68'; Gil (yellow card) 90'	Report	Lokolingoy 26'; Wong Chun Ho (yellow card) 30'; Michael Glassock (yellow card) 38'; Gondra 65'; Law Hiu Chung (yellow card) 90+2'	Stadium: Sham Shui Po Sports Ground; Attendance: 991; Referee: Luk Kin Sun

15 September 2019 2	Lee Man	2–2	Southern	Sham Shui Po
14:30 (UTC+8)	N'dri 27' (pen.); Gil 50'; Shapoval (yellow card) 60'	Report	Travis Major 3'; Chan Kong Pan (yellow card) 44'; Jack Sealy (yellow card) 77'; Beto 90+4'	Stadium: Sham Shui Po Sports Ground; Attendance: 972; Referee: Tam Ping Wun

18 March 2020 3	Lee Man	2–1	Kitchee	Tseung Kwan O
14:30 (UTC+8)	N'dri 88' (pen.), 90+3'; Yu Wai Lim (yellow card) 45+2'; Shapoval (yellow card) 53'; Recio (yellow card) 53'; Ngan Lok Fung (yellow card) 74'	Report	Komazec 66'; Swainston (yellow card) 76'; Tong Kin Man (yellow card) 76'; Law Tsz Chun (yellow card) 77'; Cleiton (yellow card) 78'; Li Ngai Hoi (yellow card) 87'	Stadium: Tseung Kwan O Sports Ground; Attendance: 0 Referee: Tam Ping Wun

9 May 2020 4	Yuen Long	Cancelled	Lee Man	Yuen Long
17:30 (UTC+8)		Report		Stadium: Yuen Long Stadium

20 October 2019 5	Lee Man	1–0	Rangers	Sham Shui Po
14:30 (UTC+8)	Acosta 9'; Ngan Lok Fung (yellow card) 26'; Yu Pui Hong (yellow card) 89'	Report	Naves (yellow card) 26'; Tang Lok Man (yellow card) 46'; Tse Wai Chun (yellow card) 78'	Stadium: Sham Shui Po Sports Ground; Attendance: 425; Referee: Yu Kin Fung

2 November 2019 6	R&F	5–1	Lee Man	Guangzhou
14:30 (UTC+8)	Fong Pak Lun (yellow card) 15'; Déblé 16', 68', 71'; Giovane 34'; Sartori 82' (pen.)	Report	Diogo (yellow card) 26' (goal) 36'; Cheng Siu Kwan (yellow card) 56'; Yu Wai Lim (yellow card) 81'	Stadium: Yanzigang Stadium; Attendance: 384; Referee: Yu Kin Fung

23 November 2019 7	Happy Valley	1–2	Lee Man	Diamond Hill
14:30 (UTC+8)	To Chun Kiu (yellow card) 45+2'; Gavilán 80' (pen.); Poon Pui Hin (yellow card) 89'; Cruz (yellow card) 90+2'	Report	N'dri (penalty missed) 45+2' 47'; Lee Hong Lim 54'; Diogo (yellow card) 81'; Tse Long Hin (yellow card) 83'; Wong Chun Hin (yellow card) 85'; Shapoval (yellow card) 90+1'	Stadium: Hammer Hill Road Sports Ground; Attendance: 548; Referee: Ho Wai Sing

1 December 2019 8	Lee Man	4–1	Tai Po	Sham Shui Po
14:30 (UTC+8)	Yu Wai Lim (yellow card) 14'; Gil 44', 45+1'; N'dri 64', 66'; Tse Long Hin (yellow card) 75'; Acosta (yellow card) 83'	Report	Sandro 79'; Felix Luk (yellow card) 36'	Stadium: Sham Shui Po Sports Ground; Attendance: 742; Referee: Ho Wai Sing

22 December 2019 9	Lee Man	1–0	Eastern	Sham Shui Po
14:30 (UTC+8)	Acosta (yellow card) 23'; Ngan Lok Fung 45+3'; Shapoval (yellow card) 90+4'	Report	Leung Kwun Chung (yellow card) 45+2'; Xu Deshuai (yellow card) 54'	Stadium: Sham Shui Po Sports Ground; Attendance: 1,256; Referee: Ng Chiu Kok

18 January 2020 10	Eastern	2–1	Lee Man	Tseung Kwan O
17:30 (UTC+8)	Everton 13'; Fung Hing Wa (yellow card) 17'; Sandro 20'; Diego (yellow card) 41'; Tsang Kam To (yellow card) 58'	Report	Ngan Lok Fung (yellow card) 15'; N'dri (yellow card) 43'; Wong Yim Kwan (yellow card) 56'; Shapoval 75'	Stadium: Tseung Kwan O Sports Ground; Attendance: 784; Referee: Ng Chiu Kok

16 February 2020 11	Rangers	Cancelled	Lee Man	Tuen Mun
14:30 (UTC+8)				Stadium: Tuen Mun Tang Siu Kin Sports Ground

29 February 2020 12	Pegasus	Cancelled	Lee Man	So Kon Po
17:30 (UTC+8)				Stadium: Hong Kong Stadium

21 September 2020 13	Lee Man	2–0	Happy Valley	So Kon Po
15:00 (UTC+8)	Ngan Lok Fung 6' (yellow card) 85'; Yuto Nakamura 62'	Report	Yip Cheuk Man (yellow card) 46'	Stadium: Hong Kong Stadium; Attendance: 0 Referee: Woo Chun Sing

24 September 2020 14	Kitchee	2–1	Lee Man	Siu Sai Wan
15:00 (UTC+8)	Komazec 31'; Tong Kin Man 83' (yellow card) 24'; Ju Yingzhi (yellow card) 55'; Gavilán (yellow card) 85'	Report	N'dri 42' (pen.) (yellow card) 17'; Cheng Siu Kwan (yellow card) 60'; Acosta (yellow card) 60'	Stadium: Siu Sai Wan Sports Ground; Attendance: 0 Referee: Liu Kwok Man

19 April 2020 15	Tai Po	Cancelled	Lee Man	Tai Po
14:30 (UTC+8)				Stadium: Tai Po Sports Ground

5 October 2020 16	Lee Man	0–1	R&F	Mong Kok
15:00 (UTC+8)	Tam Lok Hin (yellow card) 36'; Ngan Lok Fung (yellow card) 90+5'	Report	Jordan Lam 41'; Guira (yellow card) 17'; Roberto (yellow card) 60'; Dudu (yellow card) 62'	Stadium: Mongkok Stadium; Attendance: 0 Referee: Woo Chun Sing

17 May 2020 17	Lee Man	Cancelled	Yuen Long	Sham Shui Po
14:30 (UTC+8)				Stadium: Sham Shui Po Sports Ground

11 October 2020 18	Southern	0–4	Lee Man	Siu Sai Wan
15:00 (UTC+8)	Shu Sasaki (yellow card) 32'; James Ha (red card) 45+1'; Stefan (yellow card) 45+4'; Kota Kawase (yellow card) 50'	Report	Jordi 1'; Leong Ka Hang 59', 74', 77'; Shapoval (yellow card) 49'	Stadium: Siu Sai Wan Sports Ground; Attendance: 0 Referee: Wong Po Sing

=== Hong Kong Senior Challenge Shield ===
21 September 2019 Round 1	Yuen Long	0–3	Lee Man	Tseung Kwan O
17:30 (UTC+8)	Wang Ruei (yellow card) 49'; Mikael Burkatt (yellow card) 57'	Report	N'dri 60', 73'; Acosta 71'	Stadium: Tseung Kwan O Sports Ground; Attendance: 391; Referee: Ng Chiu Kok

10 November 2019 Quarter-finals	Kitchee	1–5	Lee Man	Yuen Long
14:30 (UTC+8)	Bleda 52'; Huang Yang (yellow card) 74'; Law Tsz Chun (yellow card) 90+1'	Report	Yu Wai Lim (yellow card) 8' (goal) 31'; Yu Pui Hong 12' (yellow card) 56'; Gil 33', 41'; Cheng Siu Kwan (yellow card) 54'; Shapoval (yellow card) 58'; N'dri 90+2'	Stadium: Yuen Long Stadium; Attendance: 605; Referee: Ng Chiu Kok

26 December 2019 Semi-finals	Lee Man	3–0	Tai Po	Mong Kok
16:00 (UTC+8)	Acosta 37'; Yu Wai Lim (yellow card) 63'; Gil 79'; Lee Hong Lim (yellow card) 84'; Shapoval 89'	Report	Sun Ming Him (yellow card) 20'; Van Meurs (yellow card) 57'; Sandro (yellow card) 80'; Yeung Chi Lun (yellow card) 82'	Stadium: Mong Kok Stadium; Attendance: 1,609; Referee: Tang Hing Fu

2 October 2020 Finals	Eastern	2–0	Lee Man	Mong Kok
15:00 (UTC+8)	Chen Hao-wei 76'; Everton 87' (yellow card) 48'	Report	Shapoval (yellow card) 70' (yellow-red card) 90'; Acosta (yellow card) 90+1'	Stadium: Mong Kok Stadium; Attendance: 0 Referee: Ng Chiu Kok

=== Hong Kong Sapling Cup ===
==== Group stage ====
Pos	Team	Pld	W	D	L	GF	GA	GD	Pts	Qualification
1	Kitchee (A)	8	6	1	1	20	6	+14	19	Advance to Final
2	Eastern	8	5	1	2	14	5	+9	16	
3	Pegasus	8	4	0	4	19	20	−1	12	
4	Lee Man	8	2	1	5	17	22	−5	7	
5	Rangers	8	1	1	6	10	27	−17	4	

Source: Hong Kong Football Association
Rules for classification: 1) Points; 2) Head-to-head points; 3) Head-to-head goal difference; 4) Goal difference; 5) Goals scored.
(A) Advance to a further round

23 October 2019	Kitchee	2–2	Lee Man	Mong Kok
19:00 (UTC+8)	Souza (yellow card) 6' (goal) 30'; Tong Kin Man (yellow card) 64'; Buddle 47' (yellow card) 79'; Li Ngai Hoi (yellow card) 85'	Report	N'dri 11' (yellow card) 59'; Yu Pui Hong (yellow card) 79'; Ngan Lok Fung 80'; Shapoval (yellow card) 82'	Stadium: Mongkok Stadium; Attendance: 627; Referee: Tang Hing Fu

29 October 2019	Lee Man	1–3	Pegasus	Mong Kok
20:00 (UTC+8)	Jordi 43'; Chow Ka Lok, Leo (yellow card) 53'; Gil (yellow card) 86'; Diogo Rangel (yellow card) 87'	Report	Lazari 37'; Sasaki 60'; Lui Kit Ming 83'; Chan Siu Ki (yellow card) 87'	Stadium: Mongkok Stadium; Attendance: 430; Referee: Law Bik Chi

27 November 2019	Eastern	2–0	Lee Man	Mong Kok
20:00 (UTC+8)	Tsang Kam To (yellow card) 72'; Diego 87' (yellow card) 90'; Everton 90+3'	Report	Wong Chun Hin (yellow card) 89'; Diogo Rangel (yellow card) 90+3'	Stadium: Mongkok Stadium; Attendance: 382; Referee: Luk Kin Sun

15 December 2019	Lee Man	6–0	Rangers	Sham Shui Po
14:30 (UTC+8)	Diogo 30' (yellow card) 62'; N'dri 42'; Yu Wai Lim (yellow card) 56'; Shapoval 60'; Gil 71'; Acosta 74'; Jordi 87'	Report	Lau Chi Lok (yellow card) 25'; Wong Pun Wai (yellow card) 29'; Chung Sing Lam (yellow card) 72'	Stadium: Sham Shui Po Sports Ground; Attendance: 405; Referee: Tang Hing Fu

10 January 2020	Lee Man	1–4	Kitchee	Mong Kok
20:00 (UTC+8)	Chow Ka Lok Leo (yellow card) 20'; Shapoval 72' (pen.)	Report	Fernando 4', 44'; Cleiton (yellow card) 6'; Swainston (yellow card) 23'; Wellingsson 39'; Chan Shinichi 64'	Stadium: Mongkok Stadium; Attendance: 783; Referee: Luk Kin Sun

11 February 2020	Lee Man	1–3	Eastern	Tseung Kwan O
16:00 (UTC+8)	Jordi 87'; Ko Chun, Wilson (yellow card) 20'; Yu Pui Hong (yellow card) 26'; Gil (yellow card) 74'; Ngan Lok Fung (yellow card) 84'	Report	Lucas 21', 82'; Everton 50'; Yapp Hung Fai (yellow card) 18' (yellow-red card) 67'; Chan Ching Him (yellow card) 60'	Stadium: Jockey Club HKFA Football Training Centre No. 2 Attendance: 0 Referee: Tam Ping Wun

18 February 2020	Pegasus	2–3	Lee Man	Tseung Kwan O
13:00 (UTC+8)	Chan Siu Ki 59' (yellow card) 48'; Glassock 80'	Report	N'dri 35', 45+2' (yellow card) 44'; Jordi 90+2'; Law Cheuk Hei (yellow card) 49'; Wong Chun Hin (yellow card) 67'; Chow Ka Lok, Leo (yellow card) 78'; Lau Hok Ming (yellow card) 79'; Gil (yellow card) 85'	Stadium: Jockey Club HKFA Football Training Centre No. 3 Attendance: 0 Referee: Liu Kwok Man

25 February 2020	Rangers	6–3	Lee Man	Tseung Kwan O
16:00 (UTC+8)	Stefan 22', 36', 45'; Bazán 58', 62', 90+6'	Report	Acosta 41'; Cheng Siu Kwan 57'; Jordi 67'; Yu Wai Lim (yellow card) 21'; Chow Ka Lok, Leo (yellow card) 81'	Stadium: Jockey Club HKFA Football Training Centre No. 2 Attendance: 0 Referee: Woo Chun Sing

=== Hong Kong FA Cup ===
8 March 2020 First round	Lee Man	2–2 (a.e.t.) (3–4 p)	Tai Po	Tseung Kwan O
14:30 (UTC+8)	Cheng Siu Kwan 8'; N'dri 45+1' (pen.); Acosta (yellow card) 101'	Report	Kim Min-ki 1'; Dudu 10' (yellow card) 31'; Michael Luk (yellow card) 19'; Down (yellow card) 45'; Mbome (yellow card) 61' (yellow-red card) 83'	Stadium: Tseung Kwan O Sports Ground; Attendance: 0 Referee: Luk Kin Sun
	Penalties
	Shapoval (penalty scored); Tse Long Hin (penalty scored); Pinheiro (penalty scored); Leong Ka Hang (penalty missed); N'dri (penalty missed)		(penalty scored) Kim Seung-yong; (penalty scored) Nakamura; (penalty scored) Lugo; (penalty scored) Michael Luk

== Statistics ==
=== Appearances ===
Players with no appearances not included in the list.
As of match played 11 October 2020

Sortable table
No.	Pos.	Nat.	Name	Premier League		FA Cup		Senior Shield		Sapling Cup		Total	
No.	Pos.	Nat.	Name	Apps	Starts	Apps	Starts	Apps	Starts	Apps	Starts	Apps	Starts
1	GK	(Hong Kong)	Ko Chun Wilson	0	0	0	0	0	0	3	3	3	3
2	DF	(Hong Kong)	Fernando Recio Comi	7	6	1	1	2	2	1	1	11	10
5	DF	(Hong Kong)	Yu Wai Lim	11	10	1	1	4	4	7	7	23	22
7	MF	(Hong Kong)	Lee Hong Lim	12	8	1	0	2	1	6	4	21	13
8	FW	(Hong Kong)	Jordi Tarrés	7	1	0	0	3	0	6	5	16	6
9	FW	(France)	Michaël N'dri	10	10	1	1	2	2	5	3	18	16
10	FW	(Argentina)	Jonatan Acosta	12	10	1	1	4	4	8	6	25	21
11	MF	(Hong Kong)	Cheng Siu Kwan	13	11	1	1	4	4	2	1	20	17
12	DF	(Hong Kong)	Law Cheuk Hei	0	0	0	0	0	0	1	1	1	1
14	DF	(Hong Kong)	Tsang Ka Chun	0	0	0	0	0	0	3	2	3	2
16	MF	(Hong Kong)	Ngan Lok Fung	12	12	1	1	4	4	6	6	23	23
17	MF	(Hong Kong)	Chang Hei Yin	3	0	0	0	0	0	0	0	3	0
18	DF	(Hong Kong)	Wong Yim Kwan	9	6	1	1	1	1	6	6	17	14
21	DF	(Portugal)	Bruno Pinheiro	5	5	1	0	1	1	3	2	10	8
23	MF	(Hong Kong)	Tang Hong Yin	0	0	0	0	0	0	4	4	4	4
26	MF	(Hong Kong)	Wong Chun Ho	4	3	0	0	0	0	0	0	4	3
27	DF	(Hong Kong)	Chan Hin Kwong	3	2	0	0	1	1	1	1	5	4
29	DF	(Hong Kong)	Yu Pui Hong	13	12	1	1	4	4	4	3	22	20
44	MF	(Hong Kong)	Yuto Nakamura	4	2	0	0	0	0	0	0	4	2
66	MF	(Hong Kong)	Tam Lok Hin	4	2	0	0	2	0	2	1	8	3
77	MF	(Ukraine)	Serhiy Shapoval	12	12	1	1	4	4	6	6	23	23
88	GK	(Hong Kong)	Yuen Ho Chun	13	13	1	1	4	4	3	3	21	21
91	FW	(Brazil)	Gil	12	7	1	1	4	4	7	4	24	16
92	FW	(Macau)	Leong Ka Hang	3	0	1	0	1	1	1	0	6	1
Players who are on loan/left Lee Man that have appeared this season
4	DF	(Hong Kong)	Lau Hok Ming	4	2	0	0	1	0	3	2	8	4
15	MF	(Hong Kong)	Wong Chun Hin	2	0	0	0	1	0	4	1	7	1
17	MF	(Hong Kong)	Chow Ka Lok Leo	0	0	0	0	0	0	8	8	8	8
22	DF	(Hong Kong)	Tse Long Hin	5	5	1	0	3	2	2	2	11	9
31	DF	(Brazil)	Diogo Rangel	4	2	0	0	3	1	4	4	11	7
37	MF	(Hong Kong)	Chan Ming Kong	2	1	0	0	1	0	4	1	7	2
55	GK	(Hong Kong)	Li Hon Ho	0	0	0	0	0	0	3	2	3	2

=== Goalscorers ===
Includes all competitive matches.

As of match played 11 October 2020

Rank	Pos.	No.	Player	Premier League	FA Cup	Senior Shield	Sapling Cup	Total
1	FW	9	(France) Michaël N'dri	10	1	3	4	18
2	FW	91	(Brazil) Gil	3	0	3	1	7
3	FW	8	(Hong Kong) Jordi Tarrés	1	0	0	5	6
4	MF	10	(Argentina) Jonatan Acosta	1	0	2	2	5
5	MF	77	(Ukraine) Serhiy Shapoval	1	0	1	2	4
6	FW	92	(Macau) Leong Ka Hang	3	0	0	0	3
6	MF	16	(Hong Kong) Ngan Lok Fung	2	0	0	1	3
7	MF	11	(Hong Kong) Cheng Siu Kwan	0	1	0	1	2
7	DF	31	(Brazil) Diogo Rangel	1	0	0	1	2
8	DF	2	(Hong Kong) Fernando Recio	1	0	0	0	1
8	DF	5	(Hong Kong) Yu Wai Lim	0	0	1	0	1
8	MF	7	(Hong Kong) Lee Hong Lim	1	0	0	0	1
8	DF	29	(Hong Kong) Yu Pui Hong	0	0	1	0	1
8	MF	44	(Hong Kong) Yuto Nakamura	1	0	0	0	1
Total				25	2	11	17	55

=== Clean sheets ===
As of match played 11 October 2020

No.	Player	Premier League	FA Cup	Senior Shield	Sapling Cup	Total
88	(Hong Kong) Yuen Ho Chun	4	0	2	0	6
1	(Hong Kong) Ko Chun Wilson	0	0	0	1	1
Total		4	0	2	1	7

=== Disciplinary record ===
As of match played 11 October 2020

No.	Pos.	Name	Premier League		FA Cup		Senior Shield		Sapling Cup		Total	
No.	Pos.	Name	Booked	Sent off (straight red)	Booked	Sent off (straight red)	Booked	Sent off (straight red)	Booked	Sent off (straight red)	Booked	Sent off (straight red)
1	GK	(Hong Kong) Ko Chun Wilson	0	0	0	0	0	0	1	0	1	0
2	DF	(Hong Kong) Fernando Recio	1	0	0	0	0	0	0	0	1	0
4	DF	(Hong Kong) Lau Hok Ming	0	0	0	0	0	0	1	0	1	0
5	DF	(Hong Kong) Yu Wai Lim	3	0	0	0	2	0	2	0	7	0
7	MF	(Hong Kong) Lee Hong Lim	0	0	0	0	1	0	0	0	1	0
9	FW	(France) Michaël N'dri	3	0	0	0	0	0	2	0	5	0
10	MF	(Argentina) Jonatan Acosta	3	0	1	0	1	0	0	0	5	0
11	MF	(Hong Kong) Cheng Siu Kwan	2	0	0	0	1	0	0	0	3	0
12	DF	(Hong Kong) Law Cheuk Hei	0	0	0	0	0	0	1	0	1	0
15	MF	(Hong Kong) Wong Chun Hin	1	0	0	0	0	0	2	0	3	0
16	MF	(Hong Kong) Ngan Lok Fung	5	0	0	0	0	0	1	0	6	0
17	MF	(Hong Kong) Chow Ka Lok, Leo	0	0	0	0	0	0	4	0	4	0
18	DF	(Hong Kong) Wong Yim Kwan	1	0	0	0	0	0	0	0	1	0
22	DF	(Hong Kong) Tse Long Hin	2	0	0	0	0	0	0	0	2	0
29	DF	(Hong Kong) Yu Pui Hong	1	0	0	0	1	0	2	0	4	0
31	DF	(Brazil) Diogo Rangel	2	0	0	0	0	0	3	0	5	0
66	DF	(Hong Kong) Tam Lok Hin	1	0	0	0	0	0	0	0	1	0
77	MF	(Ukraine) Serhiy Shapoval	6	0	0	0	3	1	1	0	10	1
91	FW	(Brazil) Gil	1	0	0	0	0	0	3	0	4	0
Total			32	0	1	0	9	1	23	0	65	1

== Remarks ==
1. The previously scheduled football match, which was originally held at 8:00pm, will be rescheduled due to the request made by both teams.
