= 2020–21 Lee Man FC season =

Lee Man 2020–21 season
- President: Norman Lee
- Head Coach: Chan Hiu Ming
- Stadium: Tseung Kwan O Sports Ground
- Premier League: TBD
- Senior Shield: First round
- FA Cup: First round
- Sapling Cup: First round
Home colours	Away colours

The 2020–21 season is Lee Man's 4th consecutive season in Hong Kong Premier League, the top-tier division in Hong Kong football. The club selects Tseung Kwan O Sports Ground as their home stadium.

== Squad ==
=== Current squad ===
As of 8 November 2020

Note: Flags indicate national team as defined under FIFA eligibility rules; some limited exceptions apply. Players may hold more than one non-FIFA nationality.

No.	Pos.	Nation	Player
1	GK	HKG	Ko Chun Wilson
2	DF	HKG	Fernando Recio
4	DF	HKG	Lau Wing Sang Rinson
5	DF	HKG	Yu Wai Lim
6	MF	HKG	Wong Ho Chun
7	MF	HKG	Lee Hong Lim
10	MF	ARG	Jonatan Acosta ^{FP}
11	FW	HKG	Cheng Siu Kwan
12	MF	HKG	Law Cheuk Hei
14	DF	ESP	José Ángel ^{FP}
16	MF	HKG	Ngan Lok Fung (captain)
17	MF	HKG	Chang Hei Yin

No.	Pos.	Nation	Player
18	DF	HKG	Wong Yim Kwan
21	DF	HKG	Tsang Kam To
22	DF	HKG	Tsang Ka Chun
23	MF	HKG	Tang Hong Yin
26	MF	HKG	Wong Chun Ho
28	GK	HKG	Chan Ka Ho
29	DF	HKG	Yu Pui Hong
33	MF	HKG	Tam Lok Hin
44	FW	HKG	Yuto Nakamura
88	GK	HKG	Yuen Ho Chun
91	FW	BRA	Gil ^{FP}
92	FW	MAC	Leong Ka Hang ^{LP}

Players' positions as per club's announcement. Remarks:
^{LP} These players are considered as local players in Hong Kong domestic football competitions.
^{FP} These players are registered as foreign players.

== Transfers ==
=== Transfers in ===
Date from	Position	Nationality	Name	From	Fee	Ref.
20 October 2020	DF	(Hong Kong)	Lau Wing Sang	Kwoon Chung Southern	Free	
8 November 2020	DF	(Spain)	José Ángel Alonso	Unionistas CF	Free	

=== Transfers out ===
Date from	Position	Nationality	Name	To	Fee	Ref.
12 October 2020	FW	(Hong Kong)	Jordi Tarrés	Retired	Released	
12 October 2020	DF	(Hong Kong)	Chan Hin Kwong		Released	
12 October 2020	DF	(Portugal)	Bruno Pinheiro		Released	

== Club officials ==
- Chairperson: Norman Lee
- Vice Chairperson: Kwok Ching Yee
- Director: Lam Chak Yu
- Head coach: Chan Hiu Ming
- Assistant coach: Tsang Chiu Tat
- Assistant coach: Jordi Tarrés
- Technical director: Chan Hung Ping
- Academy director: Matthew Mark Holland
- First-team goalkeeping coach: Cheng Ho Man
- Fitness coach: Choi Chan In
- Performance analysts: Kwok Chun Lam, Yeung Lok Man

== Matches ==
=== Table ===
Pos	Team	Pld	W	D	L	GF	GA	GD	Pts	Qualification or relegation (Note: Teams play each other twice (14 matches), before the league is split into two groups (the top four and the bottom four).)
1	Kitchee (C)	17	11	4	2	32	12	+20	37	Qualification for AFC Champions League Group Stage
2	Eastern	17	10	4	3	38	16	+22	34	Qualification for AFC Cup Group Stage
3	Lee Man	17	9	3	5	34	21	+13	30	Qualification for AFC Cup Qualifying Play-offs
4	Pegasus (D, R)	17	9	1	7	23	27	−4	28	Relegation to Hong Kong Third Division League (Note: Pegasus announced that they would self-relegate to the third division due to lack of funds.)
5	Southern	17	4	4	9	29	35	−6	16 (Note: Head-to head points: Southern 5, Rangers 2)	

Source: Hong Kong Football Association
Rules for classification: 1) Points; 2) Head-to-head points; 3) Head-to-head goal difference; 4) Head-to-head goals scored; 5) Goal difference; 6) Goals scored; 7) Fair-play points; 8) Drawing lots (Play-off if the winner has to be decided).
(C) Champions; (D) Disqualified; (R) Relegated

=== Hong Kong Premier League ===
On 5 November 2020, the fixtures for the forthcoming season were announced.

Win Draw Loss

==== Results by round ====
Round	1	2	3	4	5	6	7	8	9	10	11	12	13	14
Ground	A	H	A	H	H	H	A	H	H	A	A	A	A	H
Result														
Position														

Updated to match(es) played on 5 November 2020. Source: Competitive Matches
A = Away; H = Home; W = Win; D = Draw; L = Loss

22 November 2020 1	Kitchee	v	Lee Man	Mong Kok
17:30 (UTC+8)		Report		Stadium: Mongkok Stadium

29 November 2020 2	Lee Man	v	Eastern	Tseung Kwan O
17:30 (UTC+8)		Report		Stadium: Tseung Kwan O Sports Ground

20 December 2020 3	Resources Capital	v	Lee Man Southern	Tsing Yi
15:00 (UTC+8)		Report		Stadium: Tsing Yi Sports Ground

16 January 2021 4	Lee Man	v	Happy Valley	Tseung Kwan O
17:30 (UTC+8)		Report		Stadium: Tseung Kwan O Sports Ground

23 January 2021 5	Lee Man	v	Southern	Tseung Kwan O
17:30 (UTC+8)		Report		Stadium: Tseung Kwan O Sports Ground

31 January 2021 6	Lee Man	v	Biu Chun Rangers	Tseung Kwan O
15:00 (UTC+8)		Report		Stadium: Tseung Kwan O Sports Ground

6 February 2021 7	Tin Shui Wai Pegasus FC	v	Lee Man	Yuen Long
15:00 (UTC+8)		Report		Stadium: Yuen Long Stadium

=== Hong Kong Sapling Cup ===
==== Group stage ====
Pos	Team	Pld	W	D	L	GF	GA	GD	Pts	Qualification
1	Lee Man	6	3	3	0	11	2	+9	12	Advance to Semi-finals
2	Kitchee	6	3	3	0	11	4	+7	12	Advance to Semi-finals
3	Pegasus	6	2	1	3	8	14	−6	7	
4	Rangers	6	0	1	5	6	16	−10	1	

Source: Hong Kong Football Association
Rules for classification: 1) Points; 2) Head-to-head points; 3) Head-to-head goal difference; 4) Goal difference; 5) Goals scored.

25 October 2020	Tin Shui Wai Pegasus FC	0–5	Lee Man	Sham Shui Po
15:00 (UTC+8)		Report	Chang Hei Yin 26'; Acosta 29', 30'; Leong Ka Hang 39'; Tang Hong Yin 44'; Nakaura (yellow card) 65'; Yu Wai Lim (yellow card) 76'	Stadium: Sham Shui Po Sports Ground; Attendance: 0 Referee: Tam Ping Wun

31 October 2020	Lee Man	0–0	Kitchee	Choi Hung
15:00 (UTC+8)	Shapoval (yellow card) 49'; Acosta (yellow card) 90+4'	Report	Tomas (yellow card) 23'; Buddle (yellow card) 70'; Swainston (yellow card) 82'	Stadium: Hammer Hill Road Sports Ground; Attendance: 0 Referee: Ng Chiu Kok

8 November 2020	Lee Man	4–1	Pegasus	Yuen Long
15:00 (UTC+8)	Tang Hong Yin 49'; Leong Ka Hang 78', 90'; Wong Ho Chun 90+1'; Chang Hei Yin (yellow card) 40'; Recio (yellow card) 74'	Report	Tse Long Hin 75' (pen.); Kessi (yellow card) 50' (yellow-red card) 80'; Wu Chun Ming (yellow card) 60'	Stadium: Yuen Long Stadium; Attendance: 394; Referee: Lau Fong Hei

14 November 2020	Kitchee	v	Lee Man	Tsing Yi
17:30 (UTC+8)		Report		Stadium: Tsing Yi Sports Ground

18 November 2020	Biu Chun Rangers	v	Lee Man	Mong Kok
20:00 (UTC+8)		Report		Stadium: Mongkok Stadium

== Statistics ==
=== Appearances ===
Players with no appearances not included in the list.
As of match played 8 November 2020

Sortable table
No.	Pos.	Nat.	Name	Premier League		FA Cup		Senior Shield		Sapling Cup		Total	
No.	Pos.	Nat.	Name	Apps	Starts	Apps	Starts	Apps	Starts	Apps	Starts	Apps	Starts
2	DF	(Hong Kong)	Fernando Recio	0	0	0	0	0	0	1	1	1	1
4	DF	(Hong Kong)	Lau Wing Sang Rinson	0	0	0	0	0	0	3	2	3	2
5	DF	(Hong Kong)	Yu Wai Lim	0	0	0	0	0	0	3	3	3	3
6	MF	(Hong Kong)	Wong Ho Chun	0	0	0	0	0	0	3	0	3	0
10	MF	(Argentina)	Jonatan Acosta	0	0	0	0	0	0	3	2	3	2
11	MF	(Hong Kong)	Cheng Siu Kwan	0	0	0	0	0	0	0	1	0	1
12	DF	(Hong Kong)	Law Cheuk Hei	0	0	0	0	0	0	1	0	1	0
16	MF	(Hong Kong)	Ngan Lok Fung	0	0	0	0	0	0	3	3	3	3
17	MF	(Hong Kong)	Chang Hei Yin	0	0	0	0	0	0	3	3	3	3
21	DF	(Hong Kong)	Tsang Kam To	0	0	0	0	0	0	2	2	2	2
22	DF	(Hong Kong)	Tsang Ka Chun	0	0	0	0	0	0	2	1	2	1
23	DF	(Hong Kong)	Tang Hong Yin	0	0	0	0	0	0	3	3	3	3
26	MF	(Hong Kong)	Wong Chun Ho	0	0	0	0	0	0	3	2	3	2
28	GK	(Hong Kong)	Chan Ka Ho	0	0	0	0	0	0	3	3	3	3
29	DF	(Hong Kong)	Yu Pui Hong	0	0	0	0	0	0	2	1	2	1
44	MF	(Hong Kong)	Yuto Nakamura	0	0	0	0	0	0	2	1	2	1
77	MF	(Ukraine)	Serhiy Shapoval	0	0	0	0	0	0	3	3	3	3
91	FW	(Brazil)	Gil	0	0	0	0	0	0	2	1	2	1
92	FW	(Macau)	Leong Ka Hang	0	0	0	0	0	0	2	2	2	2

=== Goalscorers ===
Includes all competitive matches.

As of match played 8 November 2020

Rank	Pos.	No.	Player	Premier League	FA Cup	Senior Shield	Sapling Cup	Total
1	FW	92	(Macau) Leong Ka Hang	0	0	0	3	3
2	DF	29	(Hong Kong) Tang Hong Yin	0	0	0	2	2
2	MF	10	(Argentina) Jonatan Acosta	0	0	0	2	2
3	MF	6	(Hong Kong) Wong Ho Chun	0	0	0	1	1
3	MF	17	(Hong Kong) Chang Hei Yin	0	0	0	1	1
Total				0	0	0	9	9

=== Clean sheets ===
As of match played 8 November 2020

No.	Player	Premier League	FA Cup	Senior Shield	Sapling Cup	Total
28	(Hong Kong) Chan Ka Ho	0	0	0	2	2
Total		0	0	0	2	2

=== Disciplinary record ===
As of match played 8 November 2020

No.	Pos.	Name	Premier League		FA Cup		Senior Shield		Sapling Cup		Total	
No.	Pos.	Name	Booked	Sent off (straight red)	Booked	Sent off (straight red)	Booked	Sent off (straight red)	Booked	Sent off (straight red)	Booked	Sent off (straight red)
2	DF	(Hong Kong) Fernando Recio	0	0	0	0	0	0	1	0	1	0
5	DF	(Hong Kong) Yu Wai Lim	0	0	0	0	0	0	1	0	1	0
10	MF	(Argentina) Jonatan Acosta	0	0	0	0	0	0	1	0	1	0
17	MF	(Hong Kong) Chang Hei Yin	0	0	0	0	0	0	1	0	1	0
44	DF	(Hong Kong) Yuto Nakamura	0	0	0	0	0	0	1	0	1	0
77	MF	(Ukraine) Serhiy Shapoval	0	0	0	0	0	0	1	0	1	0
Total			0	0	0	0	0	0	6	0	6	0
