= 2019–20 Hong Kong FA Cup =

Tournament details
- Country: Hong Kong; China
- Dates: 7 March 2020 – 28 September 2020
- Teams: 10

Final positions
- Champions: Eastern (5th title)
- Runners-up: R&F

Tournament statistics
- Matches played: 9
- Goals scored: 45 (5 per match)
- Attendance: 0 (0 per match)
- Top goal scorer(s): Jean Moser; Sandro; Everton Camargo (4 goals)

Awards
- Best player: Everton Camargo

The 2019–20 Hong Kong FA Cup was the 46th edition of the Hong Kong FA Cup. 10 teams entered this edition, with 2 games played in the First round before the quarter-final stage. The competition was only open to clubs who participated in the 2019–20 Hong Kong Premier League, with lower division sides entering the Junior Division, a separate competition.

The champion received HK$100,000 in prize money and the runners up received HK$40,000. The MVP of the final received a HK$10,000 bonus.

Kitchee were the defending champions, but were eliminated in the quarter-finals. Eastern became the champions for the fifth time after beating R&F in the final.

== Calendar ==
Stage	Round	Draw Date	Date	Matches	Clubs
Knockout	First round	6 February 2020	7–8 March 2020	2	10 → 8
Knockout	Quarter-finals	6 February 2020	12–13, 15–16 March 2020	4	8 → 4
Knockout	Semi-finals	6 February 2020	21–22 March 2020	2	4 → 2
Knockout	Final	6 February 2020	28 September 2020 at Hong Kong Stadium	1	2 → 1

== Bracket ==
First round
Rangers	2
**Eastern**	**8**
Lee Man	2 (3)
**Tai Po (p)**	**2 (4)**

Quarter-finals
Kitchee	0
**Eastern**	**2**
Yuen Long	4
**Pegasus (a.e.t.)**	**5***
Southern	1
**Tai Po**	**4**
(China) **R&F**	**4**
Happy Valley	0

Semi-finals
**Eastern**	**5**
Pegasus	0
Tai Po	2 (3)
(China) **R&F (p)**	**2 (5)**

Final
**Eastern**	**2**
(China) R&F	0

Bold = winner
* = after extra time, ( ) = penalty shootout score

== Fixtures and results ==
=== First round ===
7 March 2020	Rangers	**2–8**	**Eastern**	Tseung Kwan O Sports Ground
14:30 UTC+8	Leguizamón 32'; Pereira 85'	Report	Sandro 10'; Bazán 17' (o.g.); Lucas 20', 53'; Chen Hao-wei 34'; Diego 56'; Wong Wai 81', 90+1'	Attendance: 0 Referee: Lau Fong Hei

8 March 2020	Lee Man	**2–2** (a.e.t.) (**3–4** p)	**Tai Po**	Tseung Kwan O Sports Ground
14:30 UTC+8	Cheng Siu Kwan 8'; N'dri 45+1' (pen.)	Report	Kim Min-ki 1'; Dudu 10'	Attendance: 0 Referee: Luk Kin Sun
	**Penalties**
	Shapoval (penalty scored); Tse Long Hin (penalty scored); Pinheiro (penalty scored); Leong Ka Hang (penalty missed); N'dri (penalty missed)		(penalty scored) Kim Seung-yong; (penalty scored) Nakamura; (penalty scored) Lugo; (penalty scored) Luk

=== Quarter-finals ===
12 March 2020	Yuen Long	**4–5** (a.e.t.)	**Pegasus**	Tseung Kwan O Sports Ground
14:30 UTC+8	Kessi 28'; Mikael 54', 57'; Santana 118'	Report	Sasaki 35'; Moser 44', 90+2' (pen.), 93', 99'	Attendance: 0 Referee: Luk Kin Sun

13 March 2020	**(China) R&F**	**4–0**	Happy Valley	Tseung Kwan O Sports Ground
14:30 UTC+8	Giovane 35', 47', 62'; Sartori 83'	Report		Attendance: 0 Referee: Tang Hing Fu

15 March 2020	Kitchee	**0–2**	**Eastern**	Tseung Kwan O Sports Ground
14:30 UTC+8		Report	Sandro 56'; Everton 83'	Attendance: 0 Referee: Ng Chiu Kok

16 March 2020	Southern	**1–4**	**Tai Po**	Tseung Kwan O Sports Ground
14:30 UTC+8	Chan Kong Pan 23'	Report	Dudu 13'; Luk 17'; Nakamura 55'; Kim Seung-yong 85'	Attendance: 0 Referee: Liu Kwok Man

=== Semi-finals ===
21 March 2020	**Eastern**	**5–0**	Pegasus	Tseung Kwan O Sports Ground
14:30 UTC+8	Sandro 4', 70'; Everton 50' (pen.), 90'; Clayton 86'	Report		Attendance: 0 Referee: Yu Kin Fung

22 March 2020	Tai Po	**2–2** (a.e.t.) (**3–5** p)	**(China) R&F**	Tseung Kwan O Sports Ground
14:30 UTC+8	Dudu 90+5'; Lugo 98'	Report	Satori 67'; Leonço 107'	Attendance: 0 Referee: Ho Wai Sing
	**Penalties**
	Nakamura (penalty scored); Chan Man Fai (penalty missed); Lugo (penalty scored); Luk (penalty scored)		(penalty scored) Satori; (penalty scored) Leonço; (penalty scored) Lo Kwan Yee; (penalty scored) Leung Nok Hang; (penalty scored) Matt Lam

=== Final ===
28 September 2020	**Eastern**	**2–0**	**(China)** R&F	Hong Kong Stadium
15:00 UTC+8	Clayton 50'; Everton 78'	Report		Attendance: 0 Referee: Yu Kin Fung

==== Notes ====
1. Match was played behind closed doors due to the 2020 coronavirus pandemic in Hong Kong.

== Top scorers ==
Rank	Player	Club	Goals
1	(Brazil) Jean Moser	Pegasus	4
1	(Hong Kong) Sandro	Eastern	4
1	(Brazil) Everton Camargo	Eastern	4
4	(Hong Kong) Giovane	R&F	3
4	(Brazil) Dudu	Tai Po	3
6	(Brazil) Lucas Silva	Eastern	2
6	(Hong Kong) Wong Wai	Eastern	2
6	(Brazil) Mikael	Yuen Long	2
6	(Brazil) Igor Sartori	R&F	2
6	(Hong Kong) Clayton	Eastern	2
