= 2019–20 Hong Kong Senior Shield =

Tournament details
- Country: Hong Kong; China
- Dates: 21 September 2019 – 2 October 2020
- Teams: 10

Final positions
- Champions: Eastern (11th title)
- Runners-up: Lee Man

Tournament statistics
- Matches played: 9
- Goals scored: 33 (3.67 per match)
- Top goal scorer(s): Everton Camargo (4 goals)

Awards
- Best player: Everton Camargo

2019–20 Hong Kong Senior Shield was the 118th season of the Hong Kong Senior Shield. 10 teams entered this edition, with two matches being played in the first round before the quarter-finals stage. The competition was only open to teams that played in the 2019–20 Hong Kong Premier League.

The champions received HK$150,000 in prize money while the runners up received HK$50,000. The MVP of the final received a HK$10,000 bonus.

The final of the Senior Shield was originally held on 9 February 2020, but was postponed to 2 October 2020 and was played behind closed doors due to the 2020 coronavirus pandemic in Hong Kong.

Kitchee were the defending champions, but were eliminated in the quarter-finals. Eastern became the champions for the 11th time after beating Lee Man in the final.

== Calendar ==
Stage	Round	Draw Date	Date	Matches	Clubs
Knockout	First round	12 September 2019	21 September 2019	2	10 → 8
Knockout	Quarter-finals	12 September 2019	9–10 November 2019	4	8 → 4
Knockout	Semi-finals	12 September 2019	25–26 December 2019	2	4 → 2
Knockout	Final	12 September 2019	2 October 2020 at Mong Kok Stadium	1	2 → 1

Source: HKFA

== Bracket ==
First round
Happy Valley	0
**Pegasus**	**1**
Yuen Long	0
**Lee Man**	**3**

Quarter-finals
**R&F**	**2**
Pegasus	1
**Eastern**	**1**
Southern	0
Kitchee	1
**Lee Man**	**5**
**Tai Po**	**5**
Rangers	1

Semi-finals
R&F	3
**Eastern**	**5**
**Lee Man**	**3**
Tai Po	0

Final
**Eastern**	2
Lee Man	0

Bold = winner
* = after extra time, ( ) = penalty shootout score

== Fixtures and results ==
=== First round ===
21 September 2019	Happy Valley	**0–1**	**Pegasus**	Yuen Long Stadium
14:30 UTC+8		Report	Chan Hiu Fung 66'	Attendance: 218; Referee: Lau Fong Hei

21 September 2019	Yuen Long	**0–3**	**Lee Man**	Tseung Kwan O Sports Ground
17:30 UTC+8		Report	N'dri 60', 73'; Acosta 71'	Attendance: 391; Referee: Ng Chiu Kok

=== Quarter-finals ===
9 November 2019	**R&F**	**2–1**	Pegasus	Tsing Yi Sports Ground
14:30 UTC+8	Giovane 73', 90+5'	Report	Lokolingoy 83'	Attendance: 377; Referee: Yu Kin Fung

9 November 2019	**Eastern**	**1–0**	Southern	Mong Kok Stadium
17:30 UTC+8	Everton 13'	Report		Attendance: 981; Referee: Ho Wai Sing

10 November 2019	Kitchee	**1–5**	**Lee Man**	Yuen Long Stadium
14:30 UTC+8	Bleda 52'	Report	Yu Pui Hong 12'; Yu Wai Lim 31'; Gil 33', 41'; N'dri 90+2'	Attendance: 605; Referee: Ng Chiu Kok

10 November 2019	**Tai Po**	**5–1**	Rangers	Mong Kok Stadium
17:30 UTC+8	Yeung Chi Lun 36'; Lugo 45+1'; Sandro 62'; Chan Man Fai 81'; Michael Luk 88'	Report	Bazán 84' (pen.)	Attendance: 544; Referee: Tam Ping Wun

=== Semi-finals ===
25 December 2019	R&F	**3–5**	**Eastern**	Mong Kok Stadium
16:00 UTC+8	Leonço 49'; Sean Tse 60'; Déblé 75'	Report	Everton 2', 90+6'; Lam Ka Wai 14'; Clayton 84'; Emir 89'	Attendance: 1,889; Referee: Yu Kin Fung

26 December 2019	**Lee Man**	**3–0**	Tai Po	Mong Kok Stadium
16:00 UTC+8	Acosta 37'; Gil 79'; Shapoval 89'	Report		Attendance: 1,609; Referee: Tang Hing Fu

=== Final ===
2 October 2020	**Eastern**	**2–0**	Lee Man	Mong Kok Stadium
15:00 UTC+8	Chen Hao-wei 76'; Everton 87'	Report		Attendance: 0 Referee: Ng Chiu Kok

==== Notes ====
1. Match was played behind closed doors due to the 2020 coronavirus pandemic in Hong Kong.

== Top scorers ==
Rank	Player	Club	Goals
1	(Brazil) Everton Camargo	Eastern	4
2	(Brazil) Gil	Lee Man	3
2	(France) Michael N'dri	Lee Man	3
4	(Argentina) Jonathan Acosta	Lee Man	2
4	(Hong Kong) Giovane	R&F	2
