= 2018–19 Hong Kong Sapling Cup =

Tournament details
- Country: Hong Kong; China
- Dates: 24 November 2018 – 27 April 2019
- Teams: 10

Final positions
- Champions: Lee Man (1st title)
- Runners-up: Yuen Long

Tournament statistics
- Matches played: 23
- Goals scored: 90 (3.91 per match)
- Attendance: 15,180 (660 per match)
- Top goal scorer(s): Fran González (6 goals)
- All statistics correct as of 19 May 2019.

The 2018–19 Hong Kong Sapling Cup was the 4th edition of the Sapling Cup and was the first time in history without name sponsorship. The Cup was contested by the 10 teams in the 2018–19 Hong Kong Premier League. The objective of the Cup was to create more potential playing opportunities for youth players. Each team were required to field a minimum of two players born on or after 1 January 1997 (U-22) and a maximum of six foreign players during every whole match, with no more than four foreign players on the pitch at the same time.

Kitchee were the defending champions, but they were eliminated after failing to get out of group stage. Lee Man became the champions for the first time after beating Yuen Long in the final. This was also Lee Man's first trophy in club history.

== Calendar ==
Phase	Round	Draw Date	Date	Matches	Clubs
Group stage	Matchday 1	5 November 2018	24–25 November 2018	20	10 → 4
Group stage	Matchday 2	5 November 2018	16, 30 December 2018; 1 January 2019	20	10 → 4
Group stage	Matchday 3	5 November 2018	2–3 February 2019	20	10 → 4
Group stage	Matchday 4	5 November 2018	10–11 February 2019	20	10 → 4
Group stage	Matchday 5	5 November 2018	2–3 March 2019	20	10 → 4
Knockout phase	Semi-finals	5 November 2018	13 – 14 April 2018	2	4 → 2
Knockout phase	Final	5 November 2018	27 April 2018 at Mong Kok Stadium	1	2 → 1

== Group stage ==
=== Group A ===
Pos	Team	Pld	W	D	L	GF	GA	GD	Pts	Qualification
1	Yuen Long	4	3	0	1	10	7	+3	9	Advance to Semi-finals
2	Dreams FC	4	2	1	1	5	5	0	7	Advance to Semi-finals
3	(China) R&F	4	2	1	1	6	4	+2	7	
4	Tai Po	4	1	0	3	5	8	−3	3	
5	Eastern	4	0	2	2	4	6	−2	2	

Source: Hong Kong Football Association
Rules for classification: 1) Points; 2) Head-to-head points; 3) Head-to-head goal difference; 4) Goal difference; 5) Goals scored.
24 November 2018
14:30

Tai Po	1–2	Dreams FC
Sawyer 37'	Report	Higino 72'; Martínez 88'

Tai Po Sports Ground, Tai Po
Attendance: 559
Referee: Liu Kwok Man
25 November 2018
17:30

R&F (China)	1–1	Eastern
Liang Yongfeng 41'	Report	Manolo Bleda 58'

Tsing Yi Sports Ground, Tsing Yi
Attendance: 484
Referee: Tong Kui Sum

16 December 2018
17:30

Eastern	1–2	Tai Po
Everton 29'	Report	Praes 15'; Lazari 87'

Tsing Yi Sports Ground, Tsing Yi
Attendance: 557
Referee: Tong Kui Sum
30 December 2018
17:30

Yuen Long	1–2	(China) R&F
Moser 29'	Report	Yuen Chun Sing 16'; Li Cheuk Hon 70'

Mong Kok Stadium, Mong Kok
Attendance: 669
Referee: Wong Wai Lun

2 February 2019
14:30

R&F (China)	0–1	Dreams FC
	Report	Lam Lok Kan 29'

Hammer Hill Sports Ground, Diamond Hill
Attendance: 473
Referee: Lau Fong Hei
3 February 2019
14:30

Eastern	2–3	Yuen Long
Diego 13', 90+3' (pen.)	Report	Moser 11'; Cleiton 20'; Wang Ruei 35'

Hammer Hill Sports Ground, Diamond Hill
Attendance: 675
Referee: Ho Wai Sing

10 February 2019
17:30

Yuen Long	2–1	Tai Po
Chan Kwong Ho 60'; Moser 66'	Report	Sandro 90+2'

Yuen Long Stadium, Yuen Long
Attendance: 663
Referee: Tang Hing Fu
10 February 2019
20:00

Dreams FC	0–0	Eastern
	Report

Tsing Yi Sports Ground, Tsing Yi
Attendance: 335
Referee: Law Bik Chi

1 March 2019
20:00

Tai Po	1–3	(China) R&F
Au Yeung Yiu Chung 90+4'	Report	Paulinho 10', 54'; Mak Fu Shing 90+1'

Tsing Yi Sports Ground, Tsing Yi
Attendance: 301
Referee: Law Bik Chi
2 March 2019
17:00

Dreams FC	2–4	Yuen Long
Poon Pak On 23'; Gondra 66'	Report	Moser 28'; Chan Hiu Fung 45+1'; Wang Ruei 73'; Fábio 82'

Tsing Yi Sports Ground, Tsing Yi
Attendance: 629
Referee: Lau Fong Hei

=== Group B ===
Pos	Team	Pld	W	D	L	GF	GA	GD	Pts	Qualification
1	Lee Man	4	3	0	1	13	7	+6	9	Advance to Semi-finals
2	Pegasus	4	3	0	1	10	7	+3	9	Advance to Semi-finals
3	Southern	4	2	1	1	8	6	+2	7	
4	Kitchee	4	1	1	2	10	7	+3	4	
5	Hoi King	4	0	0	4	4	18	−14	0	

Source: Hong Kong Football Association
Rules for classification: 1) Points; 2) Head-to-head points; 3) Head-to-head goal difference; 4) Goal difference; 5) Goals scored.
24 November 2018
17:30

Pegasus	4–2	Hoi King
Major 17', 48', 69'; Awal 20'	Report	Swainston 42'; Kim Dong-jin 57' (pen.)

Yuen Long Stadium, Yuen Long
Attendance: 287
Referee: Tang Hing Fu
25 November 2018
14:30

Southern	1–1	Kitchee
Krasić 10'	Report	Ju Yingzhi 76'

Hammer Hill Sports Ground, Diamond Hill
Attendance: 616
Referee: Tam Ping Wun

16 December 2018
14:30

Hoi King	0–5	Kitchee
	Report	Lucas 48', 63'; Recio 65'; Nakamura 67'; Matt Lam 87' (pen.)

Sham Shui Po Sports Ground, Sham Shui Po
Attendance: 574
Referee: Law Bik Chi
1 January 2019
14:30

Pegasus	0–2	Lee Man
	Report	Pereira 28' (pen.); Leong Ka Hang 47'

Mong Kok Stadium, Mong Kok
Attendance: 666
Referee: Tang Hing Fu

29 January 2019
20:00

Kitchee	2–3	Pegasus
Braunshtain 21'; Vadócz 45+2'	Report	Awal 39'; Sasaki 72'; Siu Chun Ming 86'

Mong Kok Stadium, Mong Kok
Attendance: 678
Referee: Tam Ping Wun
3 February 2019
17:30

Lee Man	2–3	Southern
Pereira 27'; Baek Ji-hoon 82'	Report	Emmet Wan 19'; James Ha 67'; Krasić 90+2'

Tseung Kwan O Sports Ground, Tseung Kwan O
Attendance: 429
Referee: Liu Kwok Man

10 February 2019
14:30

Hoi King	2–6	Lee Man
Kim Min-ki 45+2', 64'	Report	Cheng Siu Kwan 8'; González 16', 38', 74' (pen.); N'dri 23' (pen.); Tsang Tsz Hin 40' (o.g.)

Hammer Hill Sports Ground, Diamond Hill
Attendance: 327
Referee: Wong Wai Lun
11 February 2019
20:00

Pegasus	3–1	Southern
Major 6' (pen.), 71'; Sealy 62'	Report	James Ha 56'

Tsing Yi Sports Ground, Tsing Yi
Attendance: 357
Referee: Yu Kin Fung

2 March 2019
14:30

Southern	3–0	Hoi King
Komazec 12', 31' (pen.), 90+3'	Report

Tsing Yi Sports Ground, Tsing Yi
Attendance: 629
Referee: Wong Kei Hoi
3 March 2019
17:30

Lee Man	3–2	Kitchee
Leong Ka Hang 49', 69'; González 90+1'	Report	Tadić 60'; Fernando 83'

Tseung Kwan O Sports Ground, Tseung Kwan O
Attendance: 711
Referee: Ng Chiu Kok

== Semi-finals ==
The two semi-finals took place on 13–14 April 2019 at Mong Kok Stadium.

13 April 2019
16:00

Yuen Long	3–2	Pegasus
Cleiton 17' (pen.), 45+5' (pen.); Fábio 81'	Report	Awal 64'; Chan Siu Ki 79'

Mong Kok Stadium, Mong Kok
Attendance: 857
Referee: Liu Kwok Man

14 April 2019
16:00

Lee Man	4–1	Dreams FC
Pereira 11'; Cheng Siu Kwan 42'; Yu Pui Hong 81'; González 90+1' (pen.)	Report	Lam Hin Ting 90+2'

Mong Kok Stadium, Mong Kok
Attendance: 1,019
Referee: Ng Chiu Kok

== Final ==
The final took place on 27 April 2019 at Mong Kok Stadium.

27 April 2019
16:00

Yuen Long	2–3 (a.e.t.)	Lee Man
Lee Oi Hin 76'; Law Chun Ting 89'	Report	Shapoval 61'; Wong Yim Kwan 75'; González 117'

Mong Kok Stadium, Mong Kok
Attendance: 2,685
Referee: Ho Wai Sing

== Top scorers ==
Rank	Player	Club	Goals
1	(Spain) Fran González	Lee Man	6
2	(Australia) Travis Major	Pegasus	5
3	(Brazil) Jean Moser	Yuen Long	4
4	(Macau) Leong Ka Hang	Lee Man	3
4	(Serbia) Nikola Komazec	Southern	3
4	(Brazil) Cleiton	Yuen Long	3
4	(Brazil) Stefan Pereira	Lee Man	3
4	(Cameroon) Mahama Awal	Pegasus	3
