= Poon Pak On =

Hong Kong footballer

Personal information
- Full name: Poon Pak On
- Date of birth: 24 June 1999 (age 27)
- Place of birth: Hong Kong
- Height: 1.68 m (5 ft 6 in)
- Position: Left back

Youth career
- 2011–2017: Kitchee

Senior career*
Years	Team	Apps	(Gls)
2017–2019	Dreams FC	6	(0)
2019–2020	Hong Kong Rangers	4	(0)
2020–2021	Fu Moon	2	(0)
- * Club domestic league appearances and goals as of 26 October 2020

Poon Pak On (Chinese: 潘栢安; born 24 June 1999 in Hong Kong) is a former Hong Kong professional footballer who played as a left back.

== Club career ==
=== Dreams FC ===
Poon started his senior career with Dreams FC in 2017.

=== Rangers ===
In the 2019–20 season, Poon signed for Rangers, where he made 4 league appearances.
