= Everton Camargo =

Brazilian-born Hong Kong footballer (born 1991)

Everton Camargo 艾華頓
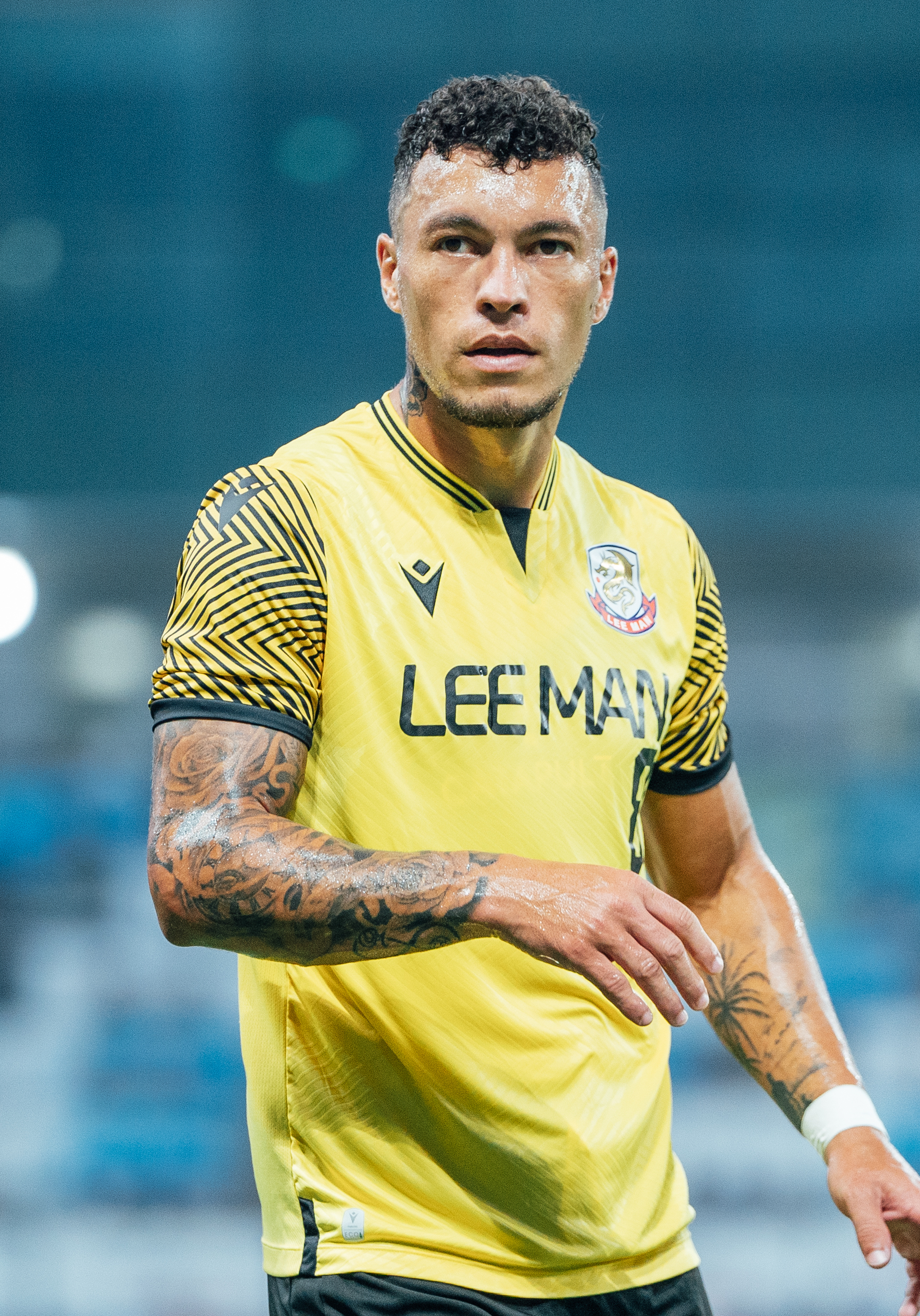
- Camargo with Lee Man in 2023

Personal information
- Full name: Everton Camargo
- Date of birth: 25 May 1991 (age 35)
- Place of birth: Soledade, Brazil
- Height: 1.84 m (6 ft 0 in)
- Position: Winger

Team information
- Current team: Kitchee
- Number: 18

Senior career*
Years	Team	Apps	(Gls)
2016	Wong Tai Sin	10	(3)
2016–2017	Biu Chun Glory Sky	18	(10)
2017–2018	Yuen Long	17	(7)
2018–2022	Eastern	39	(18)
2022–2026	Lee Man	81	(58)
2026–	Kitchee	7	(5)

International career^{‡}
2023–	Hong Kong	29	(14)
Medal record
Men's football
Representing Hong Kong
FIFA ASEAN Challenge Cup
Winner	2026 Hong Kong
- * Club domestic league appearances and goals as of 21 November 2026 ‡ National team caps and goals as of 3 October 2026

Everton Camargo (born 25 May 1991), also simply known as Everton (Chinese: 艾華頓), is a professional footballer who currently plays as a winger for Hong Kong Premier League club Kitchee. Born in Brazil, he plays for the Hong Kong national team.

== Club career ==
=== Wong Tai Sin ===
On 4 January 2016, Camargo joined Hong Kong Premier League club Wong Tai Sin.

=== Biu Chun Glory Sky ===
On 21 July 2016, Camargo signed with Biu Chun Glory Sky.

=== Yuen Long ===
On 15 July 2017, Yuen Long announced the signing of Camargo as a free agent during their 2017–18 season kick off event. During a 2017–18 Senior Shield semi final match against Hong Kong giants Kitchee, Camargo scored two goals in a 3–1 upset over the Hong Kong Premier League champions. He would later help the club to an improbable 2017–18 Hong Kong Senior Challenge Shield being the top scorer with 4 goals.

=== Eastern ===
On 1 July 2018, Eastern formally announced that they had signed Camargo after months of speculation. On 31 May 2022, Camargo left the club after his contract expired.

=== Lee Man ===
On 12 July 2022, it was announced that Camargo had joined Lee Man.

=== Kitchee ===
On 11 July 2026, Camargo joined Kitchee.

== International career ==
On 31 August 2023, it was announced that Camargo had received his HKSAR passport after giving up his Brazilian passport, making him eligible to represent Hong Kong internationally.

On 7 September 2023, Camargo made his international debut for Hong Kong in a friendly match against Cambodia in which he also scored his first international goal.

On 26 December 2023, Camargo was named in Hong Kong's squad for the 2023 AFC Asian Cup.

== Career statistics ==
=== Club ===
As of 5 March 2025

Club	Season	League			Senior Shield		FA Cup		Continental		Other		Total	
Club	Season	Division	Apps	Goals	Apps	Goals	Apps	Goals	Apps	Goals	Apps	Goals	Apps	Goals
Wong Tai Sin	2015–16	Hong Kong Premier League	10	3	—		1	0	—		2	0	13	3
Hong Kong Sapling	2016–17	Hong Kong Premier League	18	10	1	1	2	1	—		2	2	23	14
Yuen Long	2017–18	Hong Kong Premier League	17	6	3	4	2	1	—		3	0	25	11
Eastern	2018–19	Hong Kong Premier League	17	10	2	1	1	0	—		3	1	23	12
Eastern	2019–20	Hong Kong Premier League	12	4	3	4	4	4	—		7	2	26	14
Eastern	2020–21	Hong Kong Premier League	6	3	—		—		2	0	6	4	14	7
Eastern	2021–22	Hong Kong Premier League	4	1	—		2	2	—		7	5	13	8
Eastern	Total		39	18	5	5	7	6	2	0	23	12	76	41
Lee Man	2022–23	Hong Kong Premier League	18	17	2	2	1	0	—		7	5	28	24
Lee Man	2023–24	Hong Kong Premier League	20	7	2	1	3	0	2	1	0	0	27	9
Lee Man	2024–25	Hong Kong Premier League	13	12	3	1	0	0	6	0	0	0	22	13
Lee Man	Total		51	36	7	4	0	0	8	1	7	5	77	46
Career total			135	72	16	14	16	8	4	1	37	14	208	112

=== International ===
As of 3 October 2026

National team	Year	Apps	Goals
Hong Kong	2023	4	4
Hong Kong	2024	11	5
Hong Kong	2025	8	2
Hong Kong	2026	6	3
Total		29	14

#	Date	Venue	Opponent	Result	Scored	Competition
1	7 September 2023	Phnom Penh Olympic Stadium, Phnom Penh, Cambodia	Cambodia	1–1	1	Friendly
2	11 September 2023	Hong Kong Stadium, So Kon Po, Hong Kong	Brunei	10–0	2	Friendly
3	12 October 2023	Hong Kong Stadium, So Kon Po, Hong Kong	Bhutan	4–0	0	2026 FIFA World Cup qualification
4	21 November 2023	Hong Kong Stadium, So Kon Po, Hong Kong	Turkmenistan	2–2	1	2026 FIFA World Cup qualification
5	1 January 2024	Baniyas Stadium, Abu Dhabi, United Arab Emirates	China	2–1	0	Friendly
6	14 January 2024	Khalifa International Stadium, Al Rayyan, Qatar	United Arab Emirates	1–3	0	2023 AFC Asian Cup
7	19 January 2024	Khalifa International Stadium, Al Rayyan, Qatar	Iran	0–1	0	2023 AFC Asian Cup
8	23 January 2024	Abdullah bin Khalifa Stadium, Doha, Qatar	Palestine	0–3	0	2023 AFC Asian Cup
9	21 March 2024	Mong Kok Stadium, Mong Kok, Hong Kong	Uzbekistan	0–2	0	2026 FIFA World Cup qualification – AFC second round
10	15 October 2024	Hong Kong Stadium, So Kon Po, Hong Kong	Cambodia	3–0	1	Friendly
11	14 November 2024	Hong Kong Stadium, So Kon Po, Hong Kong	Philippines	3–1	1	Friendly
12	19 November 2024	Mong Kok Stadium, Mong Kok, Hong Kong	Mauritius	1–0	1	Friendly
13	8 December 2024	Mong Kok Stadium, Mong Kok, Hong Kong	Mongolia	3–0	1	2025 EAFF E-1 Football Championship – preliminary round

=== International goals ===
As of 3 October 2026.

No.	Date	Cap	Venue	Opponent	Score	Result	Competition
1.	7 September 2023	1	National Olympic Stadium, Phnom Penh, Cambodia	Cambodia	1–0	1–1	Friendly
2.	11 September 2023	2	Hong Kong Stadium, So Kon Po, Hong Kong	Brunei	1–0	10–0	Friendly
3.	11 September 2023	2	Hong Kong Stadium, So Kon Po, Hong Kong	Brunei	6–0	10–0	Friendly
4.	21 November 2023	4	Hong Kong Stadium, So Kon Po, Hong Kong	Turkmenistan	2–2	2–2	2026 FIFA World Cup qualification
5.	15 October 2024	10	Hong Kong Stadium, So Kon Po, Hong Kong	Cambodia	2–0	3–0	Friendly
6.	14 November 2024	11	Hong Kong Stadium, So Kon Po, Hong Kong	Philippines	2–1	3–1	Friendly
7.	19 November 2024	12	Mong Kok Stadium, Mong Kok, Hong Kong	Mauritius	1–0	1–0	Friendly
8.	8 December 2024	13	Mong Kok Stadium, Mong Kok, Hong Kong	Mongolia	1–0	3–0	2025 EAFF E-1 Football Championship
9.	17 December 2024	15	Hong Kong Stadium, So Kon Po, Hong Kong	Guam	3–0	5–0	2025 EAFF E-1 Football Championship
10.	7 September 2025	19	Kanchanaburi Province Stadium, Kanchanaburi, Thailand	Fiji	7–0	8–0	2025 King's Cup
11.	9 October 2025	20	National Stadium, Dhaka, Bangladesh	Bangladesh	1–1	4–3	2027 AFC Asian Cup qualification
12.	31 March 2026	24	Jawaharlal Nehru International Stadium, Kochi, India	India	1–2	1–2	2027 AFC Asian Cup qualification
13.	27 September 2026	27	Kai Tak Stadium, Kowloon, Hong Kong	Laos	2–0	4–0	2026 FIFA ASEAN Challenge Cup
14.	3 October 2026	29	Kai Tak Stadium, Kowloon, Hong Kong	Cambodia	2–0	2–0	2026 FIFA ASEAN Challenge Cup

== Honours ==
=== Club ===
Yuen Long

- Hong Kong Senior Shield: 2017–18

Eastern

- Hong Kong FA Cup: 2019–20
- Hong Kong Senior Shield: 2019–20

Lee Man

- Hong Kong Premier League: 2023–24
- Hong Kong League Cup: 2025–26

=== International ===
Hong Kong

- FIFA ASEAN Challenge Cup: 2026

=== Individual ===
- Hong Kong Footballer of the Year: 2019–20
- Hong Kong Sports Press Association "Most Favourite Player": 2019–20
- Hong Kong Premier League Golden Boot: 2022–23
