= Sandro (footballer, born March 1987) =

Brazilian-born Hong Kong footballer

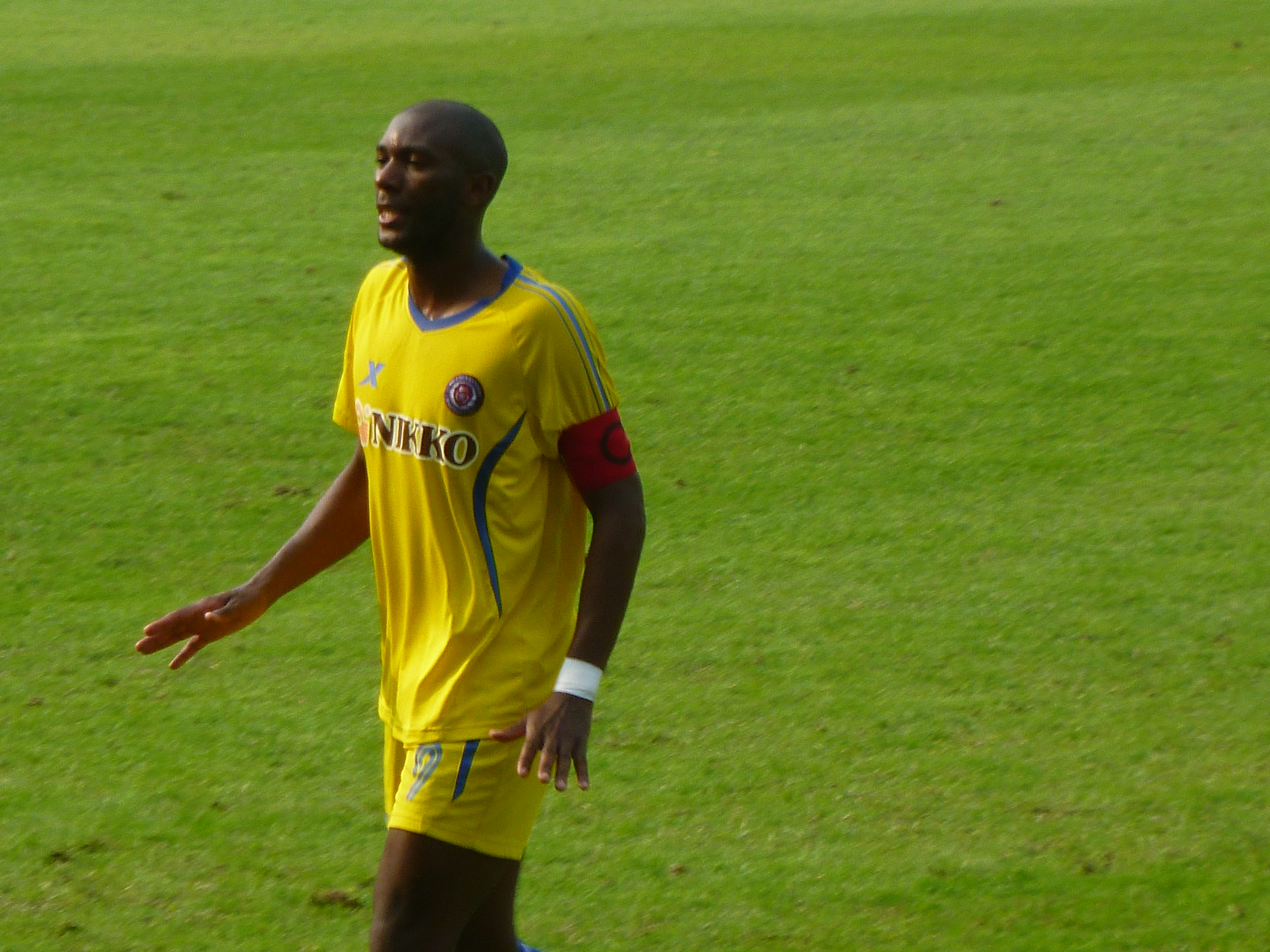
- Sandro playing for Rangers in 2012

Personal information
- Full name: Alessandro Ferreira Leonardo
- Date of birth: 10 March 1987 (age 39)
- Place of birth: Rio Novo, Minas Gerais, Brazil
- Height: 1.86 m (6 ft 1 in)
- Position: Striker

Youth career
- Centro de Futebol Zico

Senior career*
Years	Team	Apps	(Gls)
2008–2011	Citizen	51	(27)
2011–2012	Metro Gallery	17	(12)
2012	Pegasus	9	(1)
2013	Citizen	9	(1)
2013–2014	Yuen Long	19	(7)
2014–2015	Wong Tai Sin	16	(4)
2015–2018	Kitchee	46	(35)
2018	PSM Makassar	11	(4)
2019	Tai Po	14	(12)
2020–2021	Eastern	22	(12)
2022	Guangxi Pingguo Haliao	7	(1)
2023	Madureira	3	(0)

International career^{‡}
2015–2019	Hong Kong	29	(7)
- * Club domestic league appearances and goals as of 30 April 2023 ‡ National team caps and goals as of 14 December 2019

Alessandro Ferreira Leonardo (Chinese: 辛祖; born 10 March 1987), commonly known as Sandro, is a former professional footballer who played as a forward. Born in Brazil, he represented Hong Kong internationally.

== Club career ==
=== Citizen ===
Sandro was sent off after a second bookable offence in the match against South China, when he pressured Zhang Chunhui to take his goal kick quickly and was considered by the referee to have obstructed the goalkeeper. Citizen lost the match 2–1.

Sandro scored a hat-trick against Tai Po on 2 May 2009 to help the club win 4–1 and end the 2008–09 season in third place in the league. On 25 October 2009, Sandro scored 5 goals for Citizen against Happy Valley at Siu Sai Wan Sports Ground, including a 50-yard lob.

With Citizen, Sandro won the Hong Kong Senior Shield after defeating South China in the final on penalties. But his contract was not renewed by the club at the end of the season.

=== Metro Gallery ===
Sandro joined Metro Gallery/Rangers for the 2011–12 season. He scored on his debut for the club in the 1–4 defeat away to Pegasus. He scored again in the second game against his old club Citizen to tie the match 2–2.

=== Pegasus ===
Sandro joined Pegasus for an undisclosed fee before the start of 2012–13 season. However, he only scored 1 goal in 10 matches and was released by the club on 31 December 2012.

=== Citizen ===
Sandro re-joined Citizen as a free transfer after he was released by Pegasus.

=== Kitchee ===
On 15 July 2015, Sandro was formally signed as a Kitchee player. There was controversy surrounding the move as he had signed a pre-contractual agreement with Eastern nine months prior. While Sandro claimed, through his lawyer's advice that the agreement was not legally binding, Eastern's Executive Director Peter Leung took league action after the Hong Kong Football Association was unable to resolve the situation. Eventually the situation was resolved.

During the 2016–17 season, Sandro scored 21 goals en route to winning the Golden Boot. He was rewarded with a new contract on 11 July 2017.

=== Tai Po ===
After spending the latter half of 2018 with Indonesian club PSM Makassar, Sandro returned to Hong Kong. He joined Tai Po on 6 February 2019 ahead of their 2019 AFC Cup campaign.

On 4 May 2019, Sandro scored two goals in the second to lead Tai Po to a 2–1 comeback victory against title rivals R&F. The win clinched Tai Po's first league title in club history.

On 26 December 2019, after the match against Lee Man in the semi-final of the Senior Shield, Sandro announced that he would leave the club with immediate effect.

=== Eastern ===
On 1 January 2020, less than a week after leaving Tai Po, Sandro signed with Eastern. He scored on his debut for the club in a 2–1 win over Lee Man.

On 1 June 2021, Sandro left the club.

=== Guangxi Pingguo Haliao ===
On 2 March 2022, Sandro signed with China League One club Guangxi Pingguo Haliao.

=== Madureira ===
On 11 February 2023, Sandro returned to Brazil after 15 years and joined Madureira.

== International career ==
Sandro was born and raised in Brazil, but became a naturalized Hong Kong citizen through residency in November 2015.

On 7 November 2015, Sandro made his international debut and scored his first goal for Hong Kong in a friendly match against Myanmar.

== Career statistics ==
=== Club ===
As of matches played 6 July 2022.

Club	Season	League		FA Cup & Shield		League Cup		AFC		Total	
Club	Season	Apps	Goals	Apps	Goals	Apps	Goals	Apps	Goals	Apps	Goals
Citizen	2008–09	20	15	-	-	-	-	-	-	20	15
Citizen	2009–10	17	9	-	-	-	-	-	-	17	9
Citizen	2010–11	14	3	1	0	-	-	-	-	15	3
Metro Gallery	2011–12	17	12	2	0	1	0	-	-	20	12
Pegasus	2012–13	9	1	1	0	-	-	-	-	10	1
Citizen	2012–13	9	1	1	1	-	-	-	-	10	2
Yuen Long	2013–14	19	7	2	0	-	-	-	-	21	7
Wong Tai Sin	2014–15	16	4	4	4	3	1	-	-	23	9
Kitchee	2015–16	12	4	3	0	5	3	-	-	20	7
Kitchee	2016–17	20	21	7	3	-	-	2	1	29	25
Kitchee	2017–18	15	10	4	5	-	-	2	0	20	15
PSM Makassar	2017–18	11	4	-	-	-	-	-	-	11	4
Tai Po	2018–19	8	6	1	1	-	-	8	1	17	8
Tai Po	2019–20	6	6	2	1	-	-	-	-	8	7
Eastern	2019–20	5	1	4	4	-	-	-	-	9	5
Eastern	2020–21	17	11	-	-	-	-	-	-	17	11
Guangxi Pingguo Haliao	2022	5	1	0	0	-	-	-	-	5	1
Total		220	116	32	19	9	4	12	2	273	141

=== International ===
As of matches played 14 December 2019.

National team	Year	Apps	Goals
Hong Kong	2015	3	1
Hong Kong	2016	9	2
Hong Kong	2017	8	2
Hong Kong	2018	5	2
Hong Kong	2019	4	0
Total		29	7

=== International goals ===
Scores and results list Hong Kong's goal tally first.

No	Date	Venue	Opponent	Score	Result	Competition
1.	7 November 2015	Mong Kok Stadium, Mong Kok, Hong Kong	Myanmar	4–0	5–0	Friendly
2.	1 September 2016	Mong Kok Stadium, Mong Kok, Hong Kong	Cambodia	3–1	4–2	Friendly
3.	6 November 2016	Mong Kok Stadium, Mong Kok, Hong Kong	Guam	2–0	3–2	2017 EAFF E-1 Football Championship qualification
4.	5 September 2017	Hang Jebat Stadium, Malacca City, Malaysia	Malaysia	1–0	1–1	2019 AFC Asian Cup qualification
5.	5 October 2017	Mong Kok Stadium, Mong Kok, Hong Kong	Laos	4–0	4–0	Friendly
6.	16 November 2018	Taipei Municipal Stadium, Taipei, Taiwan	Mongolia	1–0	5–1	2019 EAFF E-1 Football Championship qualification
7.	16 November 2018	Taipei Municipal Stadium, Taipei, Taiwan	Mongolia	3–1	5–1	2019 EAFF E-1 Football Championship qualification

== Honours ==
=== Club ===
Citizen

- Hong Kong Senior Shield: 2010–11

Eastern

- Hong Kong FA Cup: 2019–20
- Hong Kong Senior Shield: 2019–20
- Hong Kong Sapling Cup: 2020–21

Kitchee

- Hong Kong Premier League: 2016–17, 2017–18
- Hong Kong Senior Shield: 2016–17
- Hong Kong FA Cup: 2016–17, 2017–18
- Hong Kong Sapling Cup: 2017–18
- Hong Kong League Cup: 2015–16
- Hong Kong Community Cup: 2016–17
- AFC Cup Play-Off: 2015–16

Tai Po

- Hong Kong Premier League: 2018–19

=== Individual ===
- Hong Kong First Division Golden Boot: 2011–12
- Hong Kong Premier League Golden Boot: 2016–17
