= Yu Wai Lim =

Hong Kong footballer (born 1998)

Yu Wai Lim (William Yu) 余煒廉
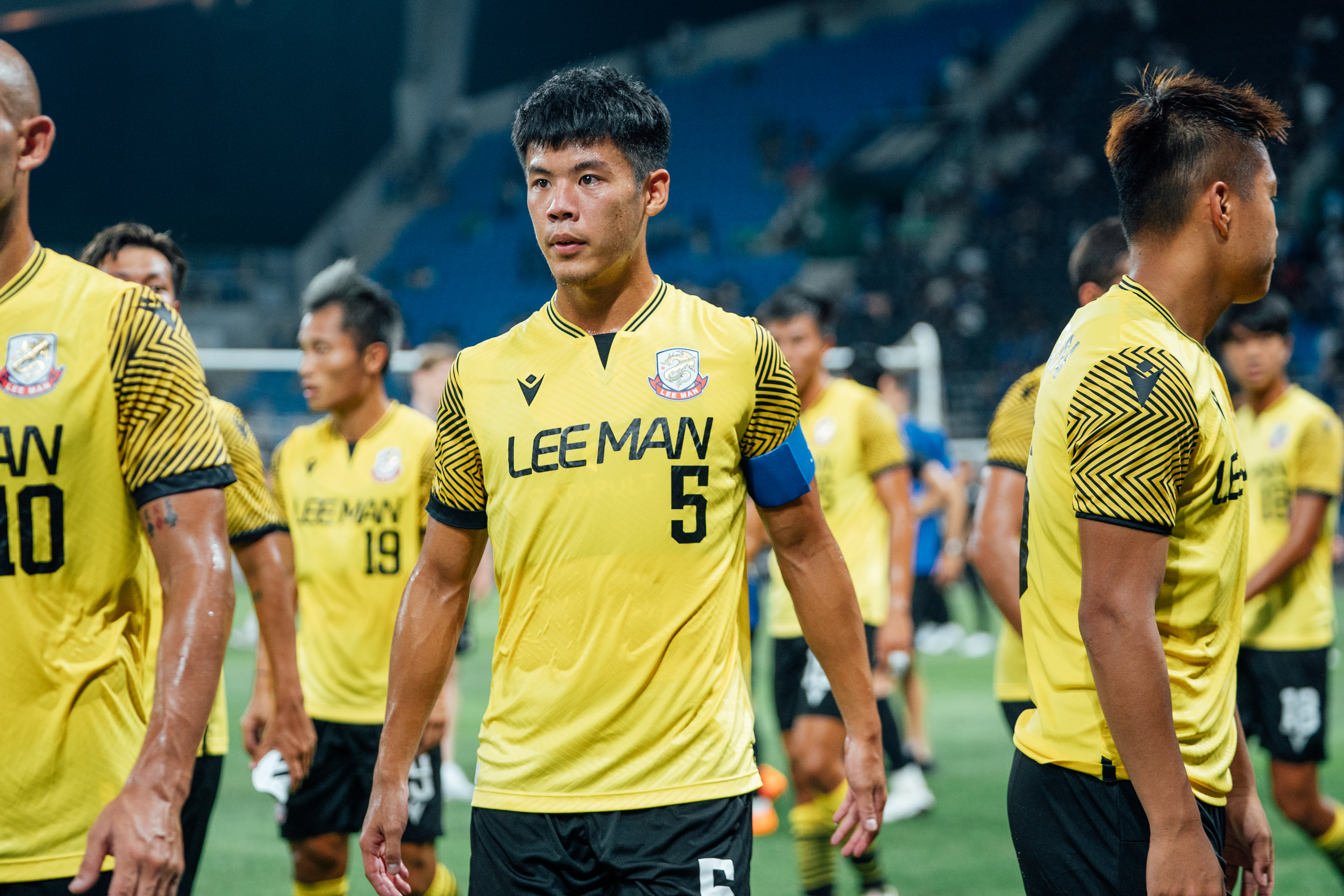

Personal information
- Full name: Yu Wai Lim
- Date of birth: 20 September 1998 (age 28)
- Place of birth: Hong Kong
- Height: 1.80 m (5 ft 11 in)
- Positions: Centre back; right back

Youth career
- 2008–2009: Tai Po
- 2009–2011: Sun Hei
- 2011–2015: Kitchee

Senior career*
Years	Team	Apps	(Gls)
2015–2016	Tai Po	23	(0)
2016–2018	Yuen Long	15	(0)
2018–2024	Lee Man	75	(0)
2024	Wuxi Wugo	13	(0)
2025–2026	Lee Man	30	(0)
2026	Meizhou Hakka	9	(0)

International career^{‡}
2013–2014	Hong Kong U-16	6	(0)
2015–2017	Hong Kong U-19	4	(0)
2019	Hong Kong U-22	3	(0)
2021–2024	Hong Kong	9	(0)
- * Club domestic league appearances and goals as of 7 November 2026 ‡ National team caps and goals as of 5 September 2024

Yu Wai Lim (Chinese: 余煒廉; born 20 September 1998) is a Hong Kong professional footballer who plays as a defender.

== Club career ==
On 17 July 2016, Yuen Long confirmed the signing of Yu.

On 17 July 2018, Yu was named as one of fourteen new players at Lee Man.

On 24 June 2024, Yu joined China League One club Wuxi Wugo.

On 28 January 2025, Yu returned to Lee Man.

On 25 June 2026, Yu moved abroad again and joined China League One club Meizhou Hakka.

== International career ==
On 11 June 2021, Yu made his international debut for Hong Kong in a 2022 World Cup qualifiers against Iraq.

== Career statistics ==
=== International ===
As of 5 September 2024

National team	Year	Apps	Goals
Hong Kong	2021	2	0
Hong Kong	2022	4	0
Hong Kong	2023	1	0
Hong Kong	2024	2	0
Total		9	0

#	Date	Venue	Opponent	Result	Competition
1	11 June 2021	Al Muharraq Stadium, Arad, Bahrain	Iraq	0–1	2022 FIFA World Cup qualification – AFC second round
2	15 June 2021	Bahrain National Stadium, Riffa, Bahrain	Bahrain	0–4	2022 FIFA World Cup qualification – AFC second round
3	1 June 2022	National Stadium Bukit Jalil, Kuala Lumpur, Malaysia	Malaysia	0–2	Friendly
4	8 June 2022	Salt Lake Stadium, Kolkata, India	Afghanistan	2–1	2023 AFC Asian Cup qualification – third round
5	11 June 2022	Salt Lake Stadium, Kolkata, India	Cambodia	3–0	2023 AFC Asian Cup qualification – third round
6	21 September 2022	Mong Kok Stadium, Mong Kok, Hong Kong	Myanmar	2–0	Friendly
7	19 June 2023	Hong Kong Stadium, So Kon Po, Hong Kong	Thailand	0–1	Friendly
8	11 June 2024	Ashgabat Stadium, Ashgabat, Turkmenistan	Turkmenistan	0–0	2026 FIFA World Cup qualification – AFC second round

== Honours ==
=== Club ===
Tai Po

- Hong Kong First Division League: 2015–16

Yuen Long

- Hong Kong Senior Shield: 2017–18

Lee Man

- Hong Kong Sapling Cup: 2018–19
- Hong Kong Premier League: 2023–24
- Hong Kong League Cup: 2025–26

=== International ===
Hong Kong

- Guangdong-Hong Kong Cup: 2019
