= Leong Ka Hang =

Chinese footballer

Leong Ka Hang 梁嘉恆
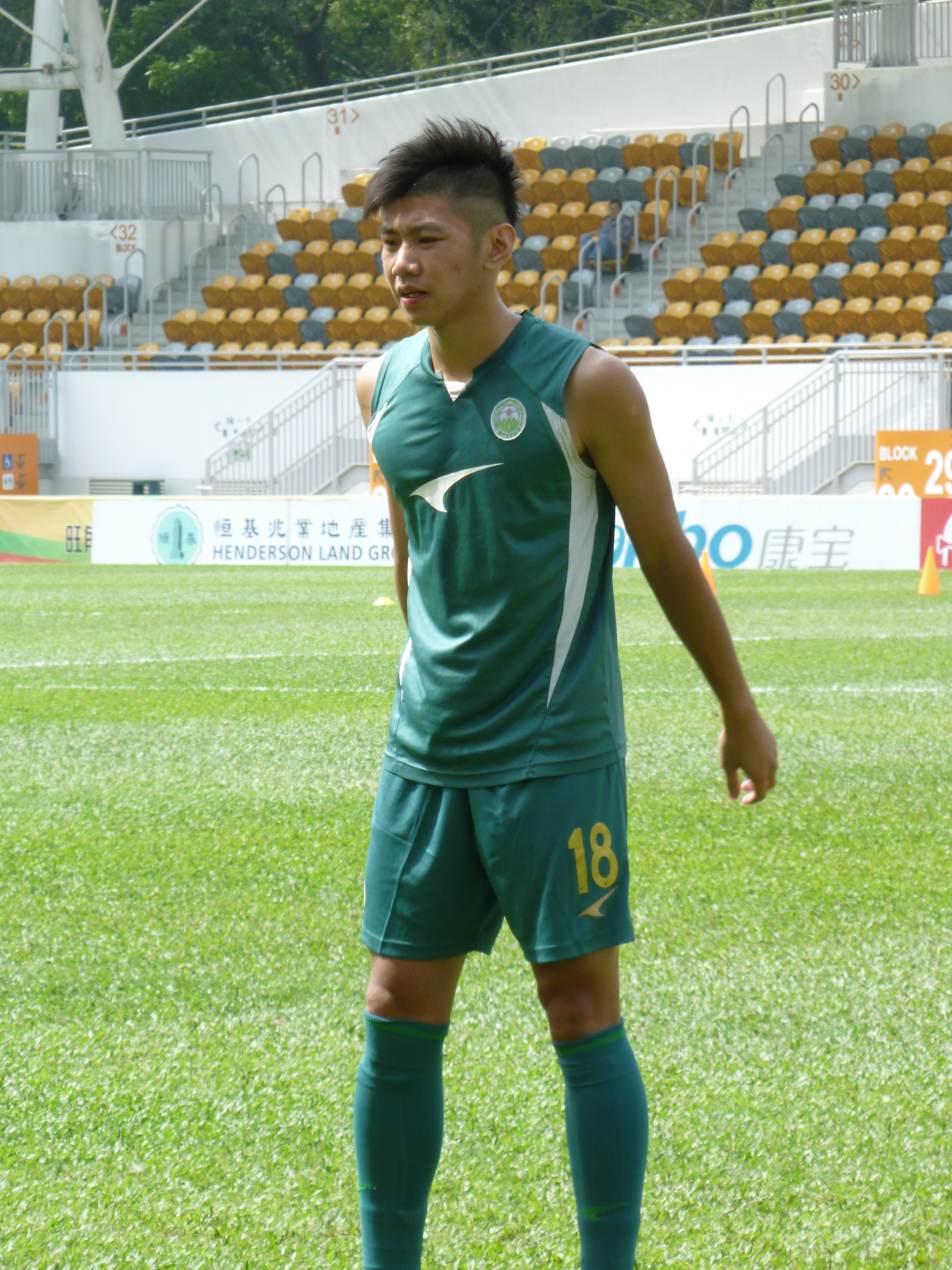
- Leong in 2013

Personal information
- Date of birth: 22 November 1992 (age 33)
- Place of birth: Portuguese Macau
- Height: 1.81 m (5 ft 11 in)
- Position: Striker

Team information
- Current team: Must IPO

Youth career
- Lai Chi

Senior career*
Years	Team	Apps	(Gls)
–2009	Windsor Arch Ka I		
2009–2013	Development	32	(38)
2013–2014	Monte Carlo	28	(19)
2014–2016	Tai Po	19	(4)
2016–2018	Pegasus	16	(6)
2018–2021	Lee Man	17	(6)
2022	Monte Carlo	6	(4)
2023	Chao Pak Kei	14	(8)
2024	Benfica de Macau	2	(0)
2025–	MUST IPO SC	12	(6)

International career^{‡}
2008–2015	Macau U23	9	(5)
2010–	Macau	33	(13)
- * Club domestic league appearances and goals as of 30 July 2022 ‡ National team caps and goals as of 6 September 2018

Leong Ka Hang (Chinese: 梁嘉恆; Jyutping: Loeng^{4} Gaa^{1} Hang^{4}; born 22 November 1992) is a Macanese professional footballer who plays as a striker for Must IPO SC.

== Early career ==
Leong Ka Hang was born in Macau. He broke his arm three times when he was 15, 16 and soon after. The doctor told him to stop playing but he now wears a plastic protective guard on his left arm and has no problems.

Leong became the Macau Footballer of the Year aged only 18, then he went to Japan for football training in August 2011 for half a month.

== Club career ==
=== Tai Po ===
From 8 September 2014, Leong had a trial with Hong Kong Premier League club Tai Po. Coach Pau Ka Yiu said he had made a good first impression but he would observe him for a little while longer before making a decision. Tai Po FC announced his signing on 6 November. Leong made his debut as a second-half substitute on 22 November 2014, his 22nd birthday, against Sun Pegasus, but he failed to break the deadlock and the match ended 0:0.

=== Pegasus ===
Leong joined Pegasus in the summer of 2016. He began the year as an Asian foreign player but was naturalized in December.

=== Lee Man ===
Following an injury-ridden 2017–18 season, Leong decided to leave Pegasus. On 13 July, he confirmed to a Macanese news outlet that he had signed with Lee Man, a club coached by former Macau manager Chan Hiu Ming.

== International career ==
In 2009, Leong was called up by Macau for the 2010 AFC U-19 Championship qualification matches held in Thailand. He scored Macau's only goal in the 54th minute in the 5–1 defeat against Korea Republic. He scored 4 goals in the 4–3 victory to Laos and he scored again in the 2–3 defeat to Bangladesh.

On 2 July 2011, in the 2014 FIFA World Cup qualifiers, he was called up for Macau national football team to play against Vietnam. In the second-leg, he scored one goal for his team. But Macau still lost to Vietnam 1–13 after two-legs.

In February 2011, in the 2012 AFC Challenge Cup qualifying playoff round, Leong scored a goal each away and at home, but Macau lost to Cambodia 5–4 on aggregate after extra time.

On 3 October 2011, Leong scored, giving his side the first lead of the game, against Hong Kong national football team in the 2011 Long Teng Cup. But Hong Kong came back to win 5–1.

On 8 July 2012, at the 2013 AFC U-22 Championship qualifiers, Leong scored a goal against Australia U22 national football team but Macau lost 3–2.

On 14 October 2014, Leong scored one goal to help Macau force a 2–2 draw with visitors Singapore in an international friendly at the football ground of Macau University of Science and Technology.

On 15 November 2016, Leong was named the winner of the MVP award during the 2016 AFC Solidarity Cup awards ceremony at Sarawak Stadium.

On February 3, 2025, Leong signed a contract with the Liga de Elite club MUST IPO SC, formerly Chao Pak Kei, which changed its name during a partnership with the Macau University of Science and Technology (MUST).

== Personal life ==
In 15 November 2018, Leong married his girlfriend of four years, Latte Iao Lai San.

== Career statistics ==
=== Club ===
Club	Season	League			Cup		Continental		Total	
Club	Season	Division	Apps	Goals	Apps	Goals	Apps	Goals	Apps	Goals

=== International ===
Scores and results list Macau's goal tally first.

No	Date	Venue	Opponent	Score	Result	Competition
1.	8 October 2010	National Stadium, Kaoshiung, Taiwan	Chinese Taipei	1–7	1–7	2010 Long Teng Cup
2.	9 February 2011	Phnom Penh Olympic Stadium, Phnom Penh, Cambodia	Cambodia	1–3	1–3	2012 AFC Challenge Cup qualification
3.	16 February 2011	Estádio Campo Desportivo, Taipa, Macau	Cambodia	2–1	3–2 (a.e.t.)	2012 AFC Challenge Cup qualification
4.	2 July 2011	Estádio Campo Desportivo, Taipa, Macau	Vietnam	1–4	1–7	2014 FIFA World Cup qualification
5.	2 October 2011	National Stadium, Kaohsiung, Taiwan	Hong Kong	1–0	1–5	2011 Long Teng Cup
6.	14 October 2014	Estádio Campo Desportivo, Taipa, Macau	Singapore	1–2	2–2	Friendly
7.	17 March 2015	Estádio Campo Desportivo, Taipa, Macau	Cambodia	1–1	1–1	2018 FIFA World Cup qualification
8.	30 June 2016	Guam Football Association National Training Center, Dededo, Guam	Mongolia	2–0	2–0	2017 EAFF E-1 Football Championship
9.	6 November 2016	Sarawak Stadium, Kuching, Malaysia	Laos	2–1	4–1	2016 AFC Solidarity Cup
10.	12 November 2016	Sarawak Stadium, Kuching, Malaysia	Brunei	1–1	1–1 (4–3 p)	2016 AFC Solidarity Cup
11.	4 September 2018	MFF Football Centre, Ulaanbaatar, Mongolia	Guam	2–0	2–0	2019 EAFF E-1 Football Championship
12.	6 September 2018	MFF Football Centre, Ulaanbaatar, Mongolia	Northern Mariana Islands	1–0	1–1	2019 EAFF E-1 Football Championship
13.	26 March 2026	Kigali Pelé Stadium, Kigali, Rwanda	Aruba	1–4	1–4	2026 FIFA Series

== Honours ==
Lee Man

- Hong Kong Sapling Cup: 2018–19

Macau

- AFC Solidarity Cup runner-up: (2016)

Individual

- AFC Solidarity Cup Most Valuable Player: 2016
