= Tse Long Hin =

Hong Kong footballer

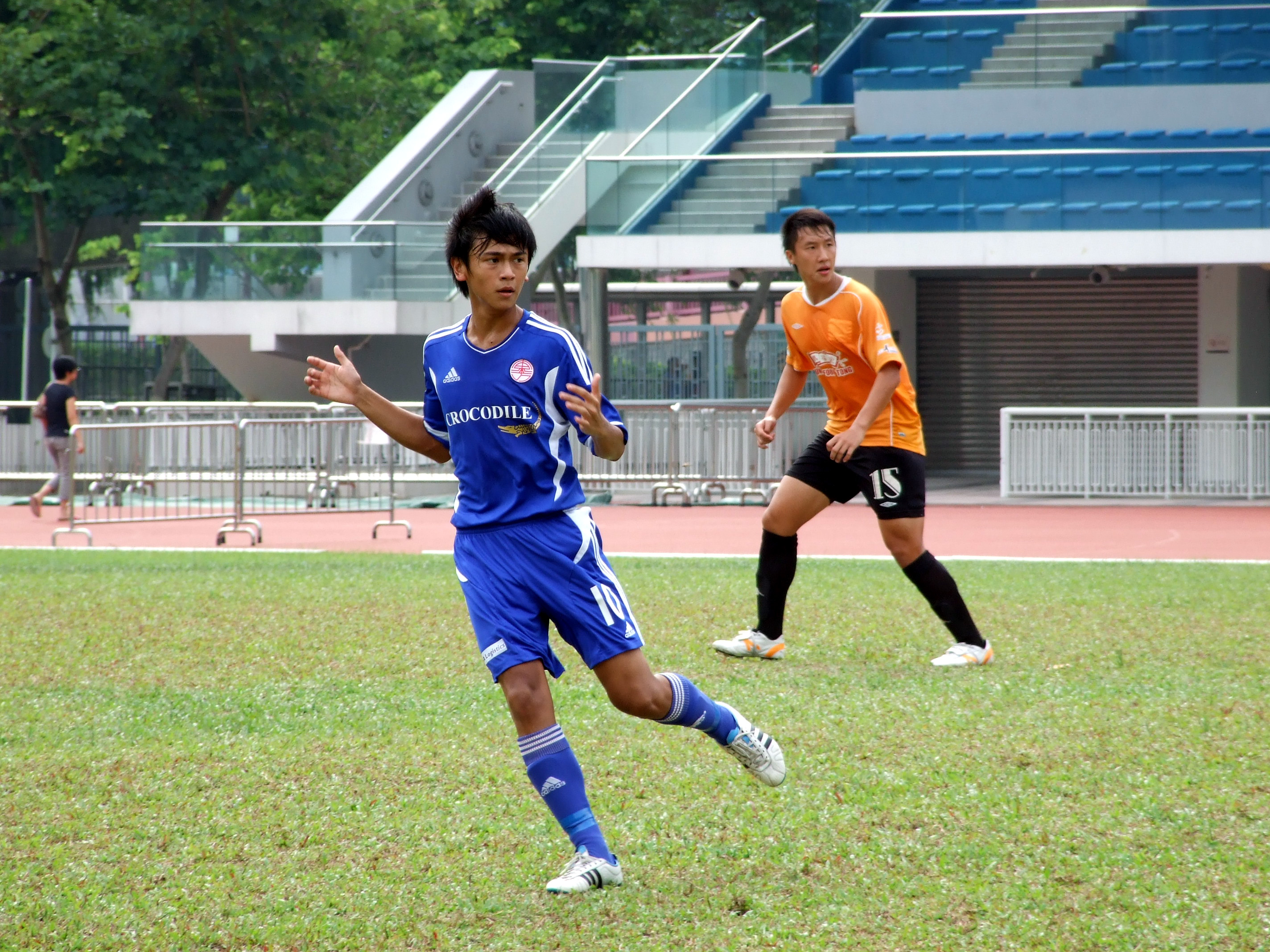

Personal information
- Full name: Jacob Tse Long Hin
- Date of birth: 6 February 1995 (age 31)
- Place of birth: Hong Kong
- Height: 1.73 m (5 ft 8 in)
- Positions: Right back; attacking midfielder

Youth career
- 2008–2009: South China

Senior career*
| Years | Team | Apps | (Gls) |
| 2009–2020 | Eastern | 37 | (14) |
| 2014–2015 | → Wong Tai Sin (loan) | 2 | (0) |
| 2015–2016 | → Dreams Metro Gallery (loan) | 14 | (1) |
| 2016–2017 | → Hong Kong Rangers (loan) | 20 | (1) |
| 2017–2018 | → Lee Man (loan) | 15 | (1) |
| 2019–2020 | → Lee Man (loan) | 5 | (0) |
| 2020–2021 | Pegasus | 16 | (0) |
| 2021 | South China | 6 | (2) |
| 2021–2022 | Hong Kong Rangers | 3 | (0) |
| 2022 | Southern | 6 | (0) |
| 2024– | Hoi King | 35 | (4) |

International career
- Hong Kong U-19
| 2015–2018 | Hong Kong U-22 | 7 | (0) |
- * Club domestic league appearances and goals as of 17 May 2026

Jacob Tse Long Hin (Chinese: 謝朗軒; born 6 February 1995 in Hong Kong) is a former Hong Kong professional footballer who played as a right back.

== Club career ==
On 12 September 2015, Tse scored the first goal of the 2015–16 Hong Kong Premier League against Wong Tai Sin, which the match wins 2:0.

On 3 July 2017, Lee Man announced that they had acquired Tse on loan for the 2017–18 season.

On 19 July 2019, Tse was once again loaned to Lee Man.

In July 2020, Tse was released by Eastern after his contract expired.

On 17 October 2020, it was revealed that Tse had joined Pegasus.

On 25 October 2021, Tse joined Rangers.

On 17 July 2022, Tse joined Southern. On 11 December 2022, after the game against Lee Man, Tse retired from professional football.

On 31 December 2022, Tse announced his retirement from professional football.

== Personal life ==
On 12 December 2020, Tse married his long time girlfriend Himan.
