= Jonatan Acosta =

Argentine footballer

Personal information
- Full name: Jonatan Leonel Acosta
- Date of birth: 11 October 1988 (age 38)
- Place of birth: Isidro Casanova, Argentina
- Height: 1.75 m (5 ft 9 in)
- Position: Attacking midfielder

Team information
- Current team: Resources Capital
- Number: 10

Senior career*
Years	Team	Apps	(Gls)
2010	Plaza Colonia	1	(0)
2012–2013	9 de Julio		
2013–2014	Happy Valley	7	(2)
2014	Talleres	3	(0)
2015	9 de Julio	16	(1)
2016	Desamparados	8	(0)
2017	Zapla	14	(0)
2017	Jaguares	6	(0)
2018	PKNS	12	(1)
2019	Dreams	7	(2)
2019–2024	Lee Man	50	(4)
2024–2026	Southern	41	(1)
2026–	Resources Capital	0	(0)
- * Club domestic league appearances and goals as of 16 May 2026

Jonatan Leonel Acosta (born 11 October 1988) is an Argentinian professional footballer who plays as an attacking midfielder for Hong Kong First Division club Resources Capital.

== Club career ==
On 10 January 2018, Acosta signed a one-year contract with PKNS.

On 16 February 2019, Acosta joined Hong Kong Premier League club Dreams.

On 19 July 2019, Lee Man announced the signing of Acosta.

On 11 July 2024, Acosta joined Southern.

On 16 August 2026, Resources Capital announced Acosta as a new player.

== Honours ==
=== Club ===
Lee Man

- Hong Kong Premier League: 2023–24

Southern

- Hong Kong Sapling Cup: 2024–25
