= Cheng Siu Kwan =

Hong Kong footballer

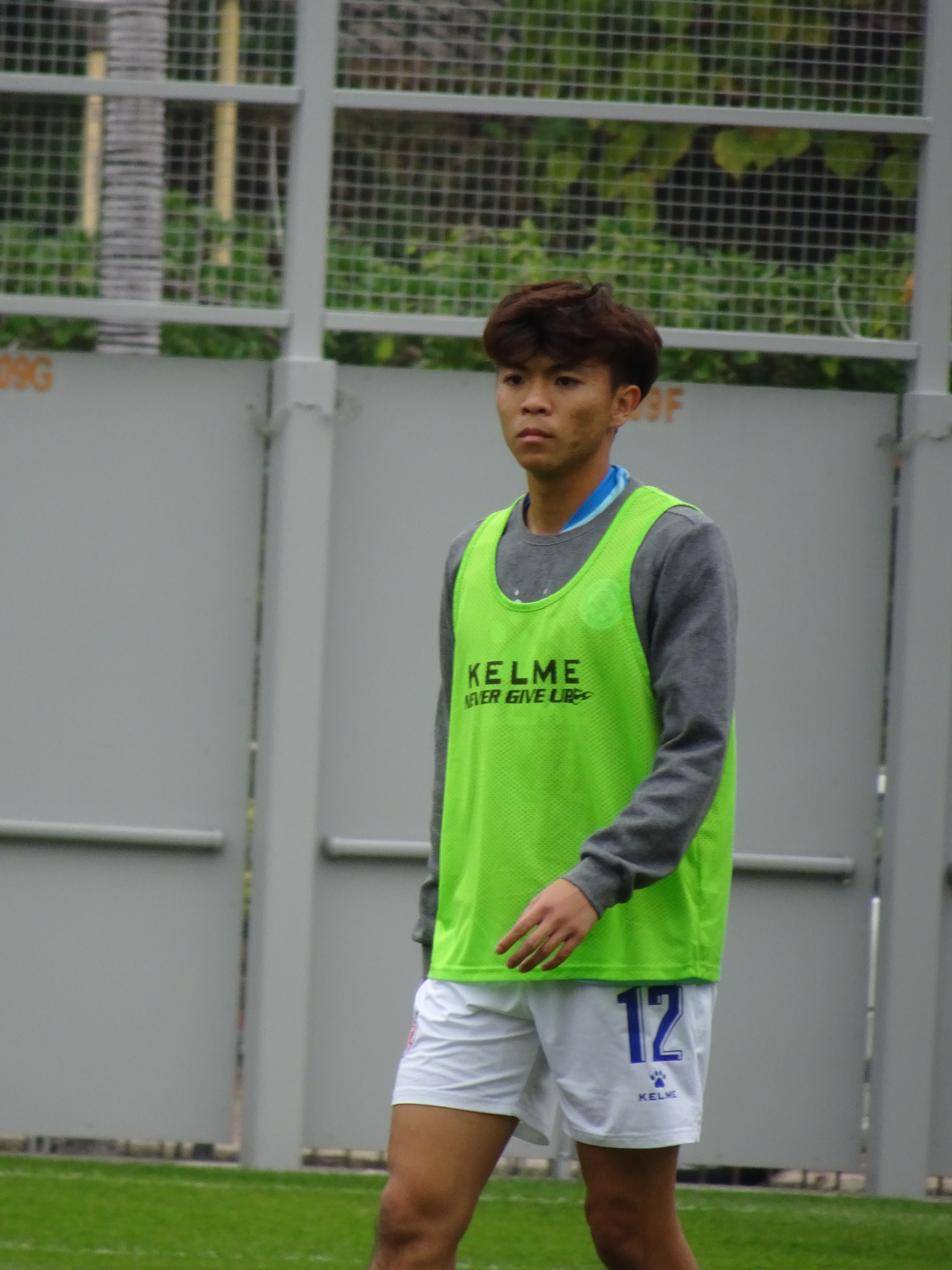
- Cheng with Rangers in 2018

Personal information
- Full name: Kenny Cheng Siu Kwan
- Date of birth: 13 January 1997 (age 29)
- Place of birth: Cheung Sha Wan, Hong Kong
- Height: 1.67 m (5 ft 6 in)
- Position: Right winger

Youth career
- 2012–2013: Rangers (HKG)

Senior career*
Years	Team	Apps	(Gls)
2013–2016	Rangers (HKG)	27	(2)
2016–2017	Biu Chun Glory Sky	18	(2)
2017–2018	Rangers (HKG)	15	(0)
2018–2026	Lee Man	86	(3)

International career^{‡}
2017–2019	Hong Kong U23	5	(0)
2019–2022	Hong Kong	9	(0)
- * Club domestic league appearances and goals as of 17 May 2026 ‡ National team caps and goals as of 27 July 2022

Kenny Cheng Siu Kwan (Chinese: 鄭兆均; born 13 January 1997) is a former Hong Kong professional footballer who played as a right winger.

== Club career ==
On 17 July 2018, Cheng was named as one of fourteen new players at Lee Man.

On 29 June 2026, Cheng left Lee Man after 8 years at the club. He also announced his retirement from professional football.

== International career ==
On 10 September 2019, Cheng made his senior international debut for Hong Kong in the World Cup qualifier match against Iran.

== Career statistics ==
=== International ===
As of matches played 27 July 2022

National team	Year	Apps	Goals
Hong Kong	2019	5	0
Hong Kong	2020	0	0
Hong Kong	2021	3	0
Hong Kong	2022	1	0
Total		9	0

== Honours ==
=== Club ===
Lee Man

- Hong Kong Premier League: 2023–24
- Hong Kong Sapling Cup: 2018-19
- Hong Kong League Cup: 2025–26

Hong Kong

- Guangdong-Hong Kong Cup: 2019

=== Individual ===
- Best Young Player: 2019
