= Gil (footballer, born 1991) =

Brazilian footballer

Personal information
- Full name: Givanilton Martins Ferreira
- Date of birth: 13 April 1991 (age 35)
- Place of birth: Irecê, Brazil
- Height: 1.74 m (5 ft 9 in)
- Position: Winger

Team information
- Current team: Phitsanulok

Youth career
- 2004–2009: Vila Nova

Senior career*
| Years | Team | Apps | (Gls) |
| 2009–2011 | Vila Nova | 45 | (7) |
| 2009 | → Santos (loan) | 2 | (0) |
| 2011 | → Grêmio Barueri (loan) | 12 | (2) |
| 2012 | Al-Jaish | | |
| 2012 | Grêmio Barueri | 1 | (0) |
| 2012 | Bragantino | 3 | (0) |
| 2013–2014 | São Bernardo | 26 | (4) |
| 2014 | → Ceará (loan) | 12 | (2) |
| 2015 | Gangwon | 18 | (9) |
| 2017 | Rio Claro | 3 | (0) |
| 2017 | Boa Esporte | 3 | (0) |
| 2018 | Gwangju | 8 | (0) |
| 2019 | Goianésia | 9 | (0) |
| 2019 | Treze | 8 | (1) |
| 2019–2024 | Lee Man | 64 | (29) |
| 2025 | Chanthaburi | 11 | (2) |
| 2025–2026 | Eastern | 11 | (0) |
| 2026– | Phitsanulok | 0 | (0) |
- * Club domestic league appearances and goals as of 17 May 2026

Givanilton Martins Ferreira (born 13 April 1991), commonly known as Gil, is a Brazilian professional footballer who plays as a winger for Thai League 3 club Phitsanulok.

== Club career ==
Born in Irecê, Gil graduated from the youth setup of Vila Nova and was promoted to the senior team in 2009. After scoring three goals in the season's Série B, he joined Série A side Santos on a loan deal on 17 September 2009. Following a temporary deal with Grêmio Barueri in 2011, he left Vila Nova on 13 December of the same year.

Gil represented Syrian club Al-Jaish and Grêmio Barueri in quick succession in 2012, before joining Bragantino of Série B on 29 June 2012. In the following season, he moved to São Bernardo. On 16 April 2014, he joined Ceará on loan for the remainder of the season.

On 17 June 2015, Gil moved abroad and joined Korean club Gangwon FC. In 2017, he returned to Brazil and signed for Rio Claro. On 18 September, (the last day of the transfer window), he switched to Boa Esporte of Série B.

On 4 January 2018, Gil signed for Korean club Gwangju on a one-year contract.

In January 2019, Gil returned to Brazil with Goianésia, and on 2 April 2019 he was announced as a new signing for Treze to play in 2019 Campeonato Brasileiro Série C. He scored in the opening game of the season on 29 April 2019, against Santa Cruz.

On 19 July 2019, Gil moved to Hong Kong and signed with Hong Kong Premier League club Lee Man. On 24 May 2020, he re-signed with Lee Man for a further year. On 23 May 2024, Gil left the club after 5 years.

In January 2025, Gil joined Thai League 2 club Chanthaburi.

On 19 July 2025, Gil returned to Hong Kong and signed with Hong Kong Premier League club Eastern.
