= Leandro Basán =

Argentine footballer

Personal information
- Full name: Leandro Aníbal Basán
- Date of birth: 30 March 1990 (age 36)
- Place of birth: San Nicolás de los Arroyos, Argentina
- Height: 1.78 m (5 ft 10 in)
- Position: Forward

Team information
- Current team: Unión San Felipe

Senior career*
Years	Team	Apps	(Gls)
2009–2011	Racing Club		
2011–2012	La Emilia		
2012–2013	Defensores de Belgrano VR	10	(2)
2013	Central Córdoba Rosario	11	(0)
2013–2014	Coronel Aguirre		
2015	La Emilia		
2016	Belgrano San Nicolás	–	(–)
2016	Rivadavia	7	(2)
2017	Coronel Aguirre		
2017	Rivadavia VT	–	(–)
2018	Peñarol Elortondo	–	(–)
2018	Douglas Haig	9	(0)
2018	UD General Rojo	12	(7)
2019–2020	Hong Kong Rangers	7	(6)
2020–2021	Deportivo Sanarate	4	(1)
2021–2022	Hong Kong Rangers	4	(7)
2022	Cumbayá	9	(3)
2023	Manta	31	(14)
2024	Libertad FC	12	(0)
2024–	Unión San Felipe	0	(0)
- * Club domestic league appearances and goals as of 1 November 2022

Leandro Aníbal Basán (born 30 March 1990) is an Argentine professional footballer who plays as a forward for Chilean club Unión San Felipe.

== Career ==
In July 2019, Basán moved to Hong Kong and joined Hong Kong Rangers in the Premier League.

In 2024, Basán played for Ecuadorian club Libertad FC. In the second half of the same year, he moved to Chile and signed with Unión San Felipe in the Primera B.
