= Michael Luk =

Hong Kong footballer (born 1986)

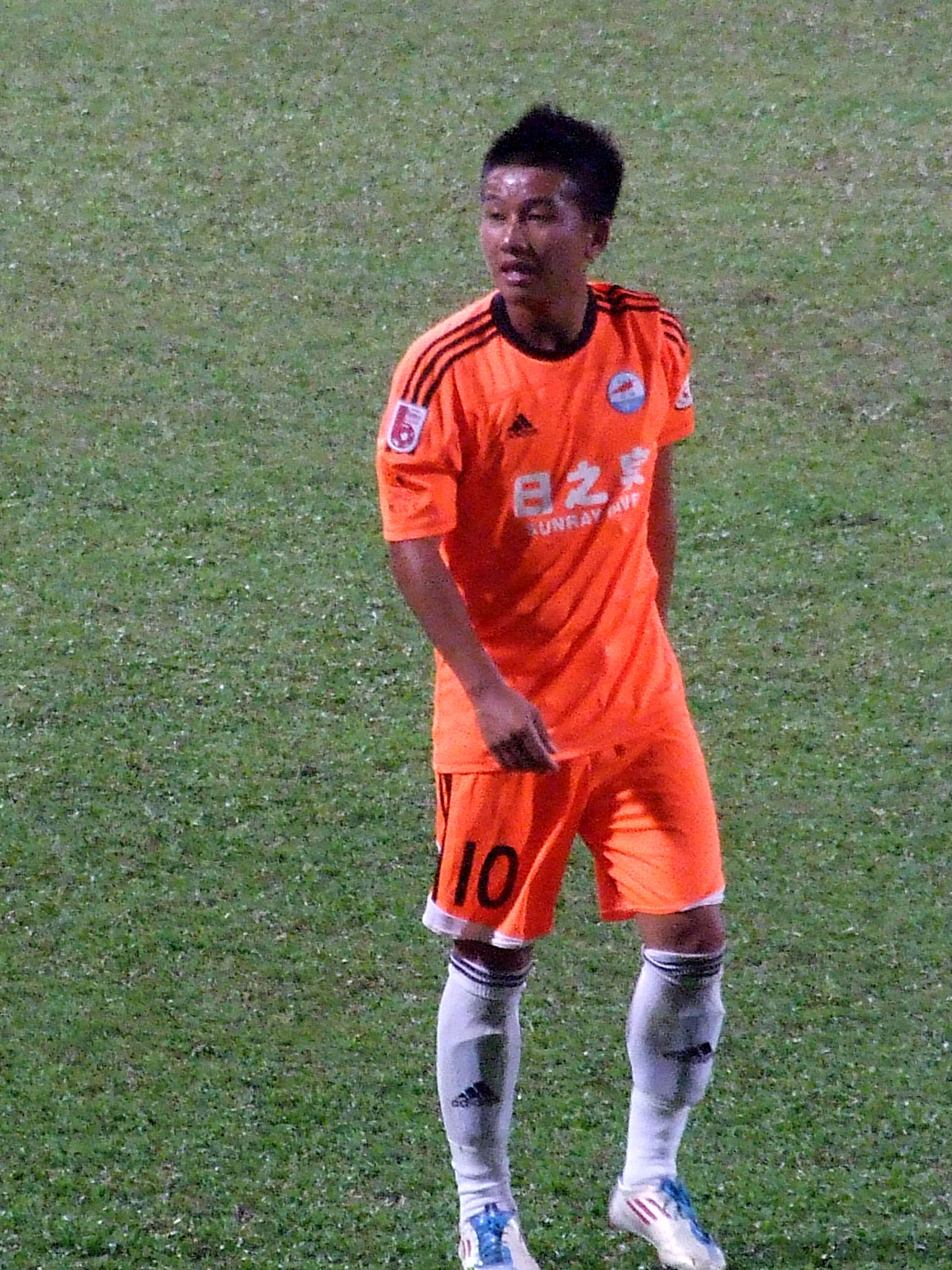
- Michael Luk plays for Sun Hei

Personal information
- Full name: Michael Chi Ho Luk
- Date of birth: 22 August 1986 (age 40)
- Place of birth: Hong Kong
- Height: 1.73 m (5 ft 8 in)
- Positions: Defender; midfielder

Youth career
- 2002–2003: Woodbridge Strikers
- 2003–2004: North York Hearts-Azzurri
- 2006–2007: St. John's Red Storm
- 2008–2009: Winthrop Eagles

Senior career*
Years	Team	Apps	(Gls)
2008	Newark Ironbound Express	1	(0)
2009	Toronto Lynx	13	(1)
2010	Portugal FC	2	(1)
2010–2012	Sun Hei	32	(7)
2012–2014	South China	23	(2)
2014–2015	Eastern	6	(1)
2015–2019	Southern	58	(9)
2019–2020	Tai Po	8	(1)
2020–2022	Hoi King	4	(0)
Total		109	(20)

International career
2003	Canada U17	5	(0)
2012–2021	Hong Kong	4	(0)
- * Club domestic league appearances and goals as of 1 July 2020

Michael Luk
- Traditional Chinese: 陸志豪
- Simplified Chinese: 陆志豪
Transcriptions
Standard Mandarin
- Hanyu Pinyin: Lù Zhìháo
Yue: Cantonese
- Jyutping: luk^{6} zi^{3} hou^{4}

Michael Chi Ho Luk (born 22 August 1986) is a Hong Kong former professional footballer.

== Early life ==
Luk was born on 22 August 1986 in Hong Kong to parents Joe Luk and Susan Choi. Michael Luk lived in Scarborough, Ontario after his family left Hong Kong when he was aged 5.

== Club career ==
=== North America ===
Luk started his football career in Ontario Football club Woodbridge Strikers in 2002 and he moved to North York Hearts-Azzurri in 2003. His performance attracted national team coach and played for Canada U-17 in this season.

Between 2005 and 2008, Luk played for St. John's Red Storm. He mostly played as defender in the team but he also played games as midfielder. He studied in Winthrop University after his high school education, and he continued his career in Winthrop Eagles soccer team.

Luk played for Premier Development League club Newark Ironbound Express in 2008 and Toronto Lynx in 2009. Toronto Lynx set him as one of main players and he was given the number 10 shirt upon his arrival Toronto. He scored his first goal of formal competition in the league match against Fort Wayne Fever in Edelweiss Park on 11 July 2009. In 2010, he signed with Portugal FC of the Canadian Soccer League, making his debut for the club on 28 May 2010, in a match against Montreal Impact Academy. Shortly after Nanchang Bayi offered Luk a trial for the first team in June 2010 and since he was born in Hong Kong the Chinese Football Association counted him as a local player. However, Nanchang Hengyuan abandoned Luk after Asqar Jadigerov joined the team.

=== Hong Kong ===
Michael Luk came back to Hong Kong and had a trial in Sun Hei in South Central China in August 2010. He passed the trial and moved to the first team for 2010–11 season. On 7 September 2010, Luk made his professional career debut, as a substitute for Chao Pengfei in a 3–0 victory at home to Tai Chung.

Luk scored his first goal of his professional career by a long-range volley shoot on the 2nd-minute of the league match against Citizen on 17 October 2010. He also finished his first hat-trick of his senior career by another two goals on the 56th-minute by direct free kick and the 64th-minute by penalty. At the end, it is theatrical that Sun Hei lost the game by 4–5.

After a year flawless performance, Luk was handed number 10 shirt, last worn by captain Chan Yiu Lun, and was planned as leading player in 2011–12 season. Luk was start player in opening match of 100th First Division League season drew defending Kitchee on 3 September 2011.

On 1 July 2019, it was announced that Luk would leave Southern after four seasons. A month later, Luk was confirmed as Tai Po player on 6 August 2019.

On 7 November 2020, Luk joined Hong Kong First Division club Hoi King.

== International career ==
Michael Luk was selected by Canada men's national under-17 soccer team for friendlies against United States and Jamaica in 2003. He played 5 matches in this year with one start-up chance but had no score. Canada did not win these 5 matches.

Michael Luk made his international debut for the Hong Kong national football team on 14 November 2012 against Malaysia. He replaced Huang Yang on the 90th minute.

== Statistics ==
=== Club statistics ===
As of 9 May 2013

Club performance			League		Cup		League Cup		Continental		Total	
Season	Club	League	Apps	Goals	Apps	Goals	Apps	Goals	Apps	Goals	Apps	Goals
USA			League		Open Cup		League Cup		North America		Total	
2008	Ironbound	PDL	1	0	0	0	—		—		1	0
2009	Toronto Lynx	PDL	13	1	—		—		—		13	1
Canada			League		Givova Cup		League Cup		North America		Total	
2010	Portugal FC	CSL	2	1	—		—		—		2	1
Hong Kong			League		FA Cup & Shield		League Cup		Asia		Total	
2010–11	Sun Hei	First Division	18	4	3	0	1	0	—		22	4
2011–12	Sun Hei	First Division	14	3	6	0	1	0	—		21	3
2012–13	South China	First Division	12	2	8	1	0	0	—		20	3
Total	USA		14	1	0	0	0	0	0	0	14	1
Total	Canada		2	1	0	0	0	0	0	0	2	1
Total	Hong Kong		44	9	17	1	2	0	0	0	63	10
Career total			60	11	17	1	2	0	0	0	79	12

=== International statistics ===
==== Canada U17 ====
As of 13 April 2012

Canada U17 appearances and goals
#	Date	Venue	Opponent	Result	Scored	Competition
1	19 February 2003	Arnett Park, Kingston, Jamaica	Jamaica	0–2	0	Friendly
2	21 February 2003	Prison Oval, Spanish Town, Jamaica	Jamaica	1–1	0	Friendly
3	23 February 2003	Railway Oval, Kingston, Jamaica	Jamaica	0–0	0	Friendly
4	11 July 2003	Macalester College, Bloomington, Minnesota, United States	United States	0–2	0	Friendly
5	13 July 2003	National Sports Center, Blaine, Minnesota, United States	United States	1–3	0	Friendly

==== Hong Kong ====
As of 9 December 2012

Hong Kong appearances and goals
#	Date	Venue	Opponent	Result	Scored	Competition
1	14 November 2012	Shah Alam Stadium, Shah Alam, Malaysia	Malaysia	1–1	0	Friendly
2	1 December 2012	Mong Kok Stadium, Mong Kok, Hong Kong	Guam	2–1	0	2013 EAFF East Asian Cup Preliminary Competition Round 2
3	7 December 2012	Hong Kong Stadium, So Kon Po, Hong Kong	Chinese Taipei	2–0	0	2013 EAFF East Asian Cup Preliminary Competition Round 2
4	9 December 2012	Hong Kong Stadium, So Kon Po, Hong Kong	North Korea	0–4	0	2013 EAFF East Asian Cup Preliminary Competition Round 2

== Honours ==
=== Club ===
South China

- Hong Kong First Division: 2012–13

Sun Hei

- Hong Kong Senior Shield: 2011–12
