= Yuto Nakamura =

Hong Kong footballer

Yuto Nakamura 中村 ゆうと 中村祐人
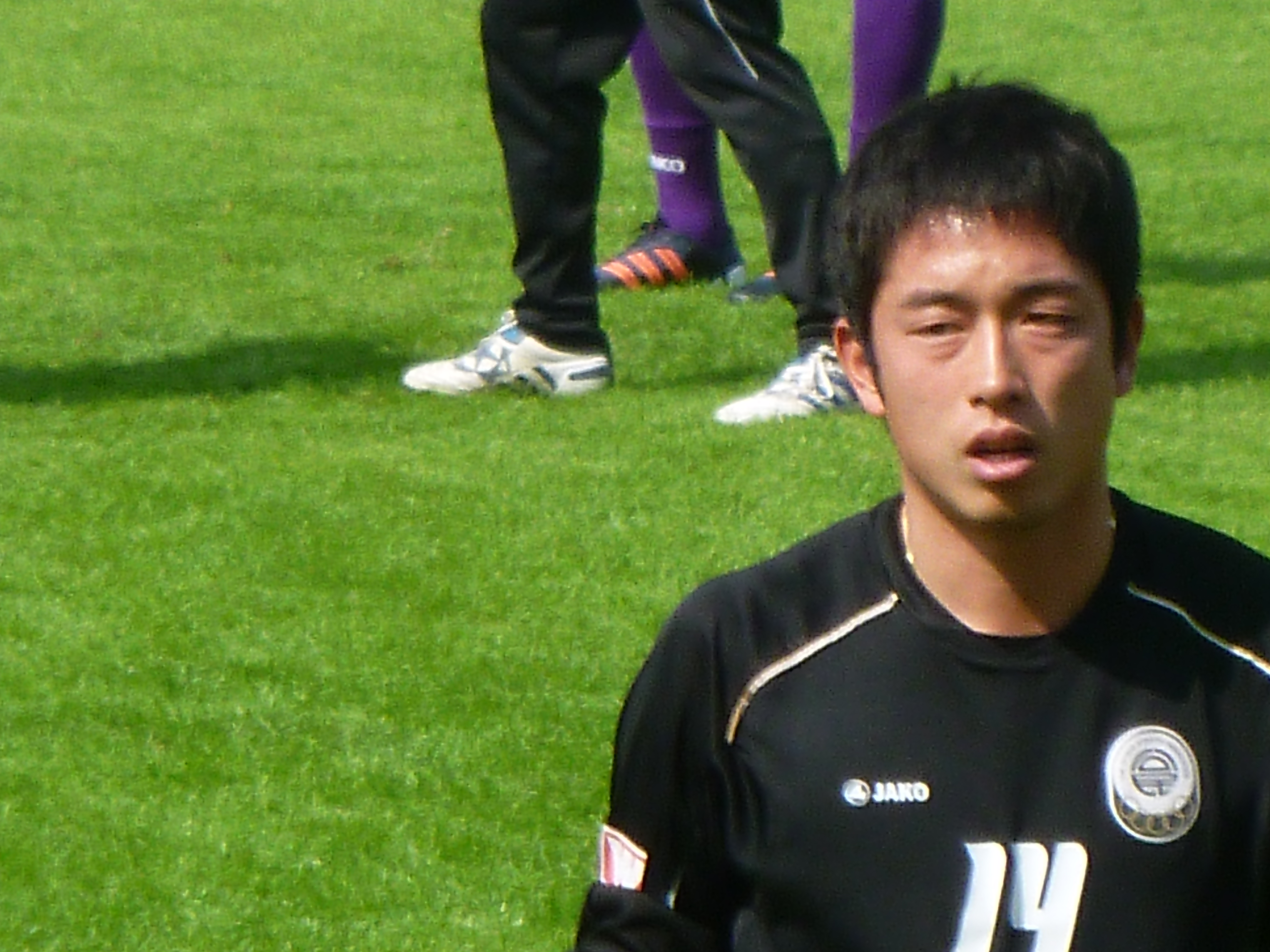
- Nakamura playing for Citizen in 2012

Personal information
- Full name: Yuto Nakamura
- Date of birth: 23 January 1987 (age 39)
- Place of birth: Urayasu, Chiba, Japan
- Height: 1.73 m (5 ft 8 in)
- Position: Striker

Youth career
- 2002–2004: Urawa Red Diamonds
- 2005–2008: Aoyama Gakuin University

Senior career*
Years	Team	Apps	(Gls)
2009	Pegasus	12	(7)
2009–2010	Portimonense	2	(0)
2010	Pegasus	4	(1)
2011–2014	Citizen	18	(5)
2014–2016	South China	21	(10)
2015–2016	→ Wong Tai Sin (loan)	14	(2)
2016–2018	Tai Po	29	(5)
2018–2020	Kitchee	11	(2)
2019–2020	→ Tai Po (loan)	7	(2)
2020–2023	Lee Man	27	(2)

International career^{‡}
2018	Hong Kong	1	(0)
- * Club domestic league appearances and goals as of 24 June 2023 ‡ National team caps and goals as of 16 October 2018

Yuto Nakamura (Japanese: 中村 ゆうと Nakamura Yūto; Chinese: 中村祐人 Zhōngcūn Yòurén; born 23 January 1987) is a former professional footballer who played as a striker. Born in Japan, he played for the Hong Kong national football team.

== Club career ==
=== Citizen ===
On 16 December 2011, Nakamura scored a hat-trick against league leaders Sun Hei and ended their 11-match unbeaten run.

On 7 March 2011, Nakamura scored for Citizen against Home United at Bishan Stadium, Singapore in the 2012 AFC Cup, but Home United FC fought back and won the match 3–1.

=== Kitchee ===
On 12 July 2018, Kitchee announced the signing of Nakamura.

=== Tai Po ===
On 25 September 2019, Nakamura was loaned to Tai Po for the 2019–20 season.

=== Lee Man ===
On 2 June 2020, Lee Man announced that Nakamura had joined the club.

On 24 June 2023, Nakamura announced his retirement from professional football.

== International career ==
In October 2018, Nakamura received his HKSAR passport and was called up to the Hong Kong team in the same month. On 16 October 2018, he made his international debut in a friendly match against Indonesia.

== Career statistics ==
=== Club ===
As of 31 March 2010

Club performance			League		Cup		League Cup		Continental		Total	
Season	Club	League	Apps	Goals	Apps	Goals	Apps	Goals	Apps	Goals	Apps	Goals
Hong Kong			League		FA Cup & Shield		League Cup		Asia		Total	
2008–09	Pegasus	First Division	12	7	4	4	4	1	-		20	12
Portugal			League		Taça de Portugal		Taça da Liga		Europe		Total	
2009–10	Portimonense	Liga de Honra	2	0	0	0	1	0	-		3	0
Career total			14	7	4	4	5	1	0	0	23	12

=== International ===
As of matches played 16 October 2018.

National team	Year	Apps	Goals
Hong Kong	2018	1	0
Total		1	0

== Honours ==
Pegasus

- Hong Kong Senior Shield: 2008–09

Kitchee

- Hong Kong Senior Shield: 2018–19
- Hong Kong FA Cup: 2018–19
