= Yu Pui Hong =

Hong Kong footballer

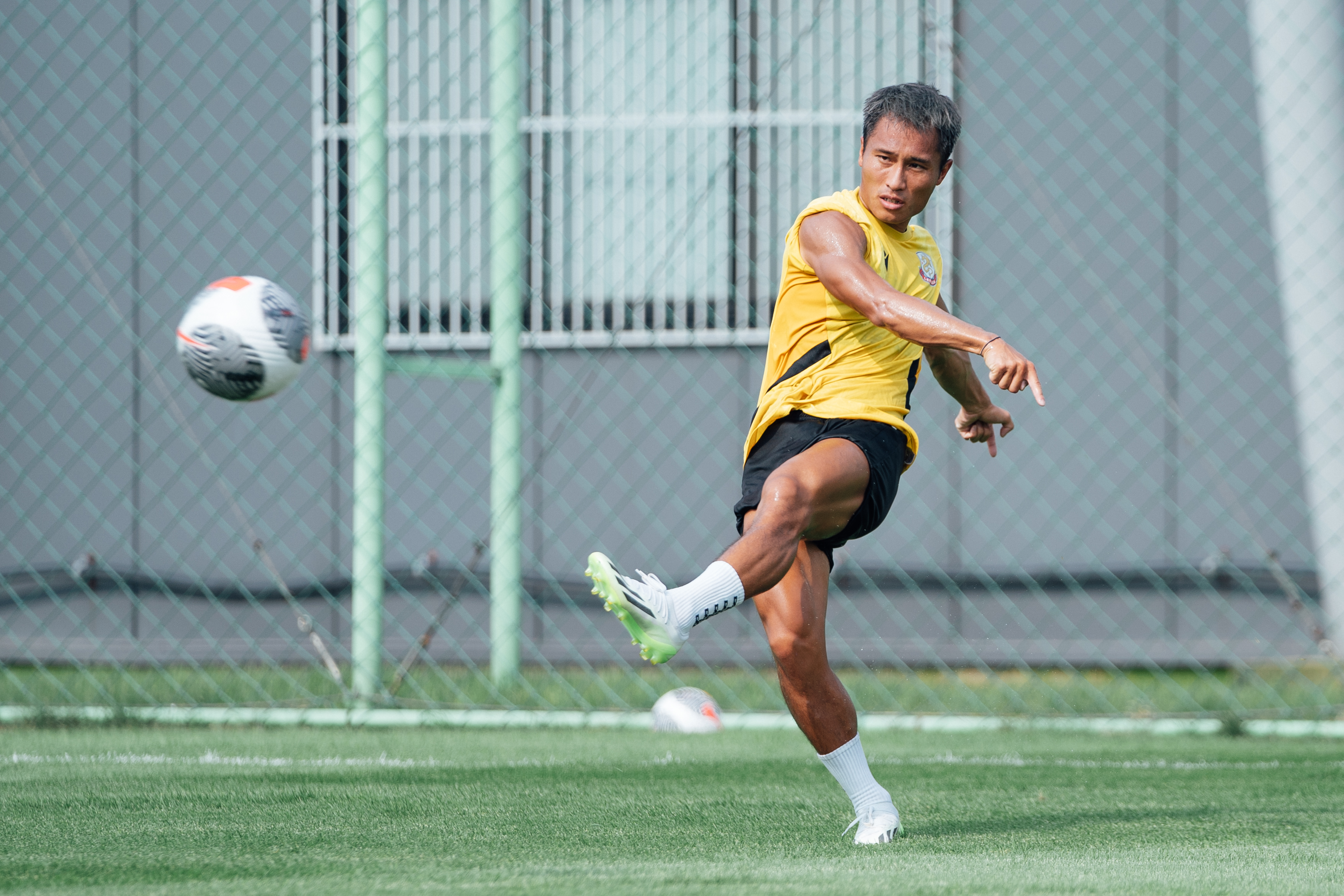

Personal information
- Full name: Yu Pui Hong
- Date of birth: 7 February 1995 (age 31)
- Place of birth: Hong Kong
- Height: 1.70 m (5 ft 7 in)
- Position: Left back

Team information
- Current team: Kowloon City
- Number: 2

Youth career
- Eastern

Senior career*
Years	Team	Apps	(Gls)
2010–2016	Eastern	41	(2)
2014–2016	→ Wong Tai Sin (loan)	8	(0)
2016–2017	Biu Chun Glory Sky	14	(0)
2017–2024	Lee Man	70	(1)
2024–	Kowloon City	47	(0)

International career^{‡}
2016	Hong Kong U-20	2	(0)
2017–2018	Hong Kong U-23	6	(0)
- * Club domestic league appearances and goals as of 8 November 2026 ‡ National team caps and goals as of 13 June 2019

Yu Pui Hong (Chinese: 余沛康; born 7 February 1995) is a Hong Kong professional footballer who currently plays as a left back for Hong Kong Premier League club Kowloon City.

== Club career ==
On 3 July 2017, Lee Man announced that they had signed Yu to a contract.

On 18 July 2024, Yu joined Kowloon City.

== Honour ==
Lee Man

- Hong Kong Premier League: 2023–24
