= Serhiy Shapoval =

Ukrainian footballer

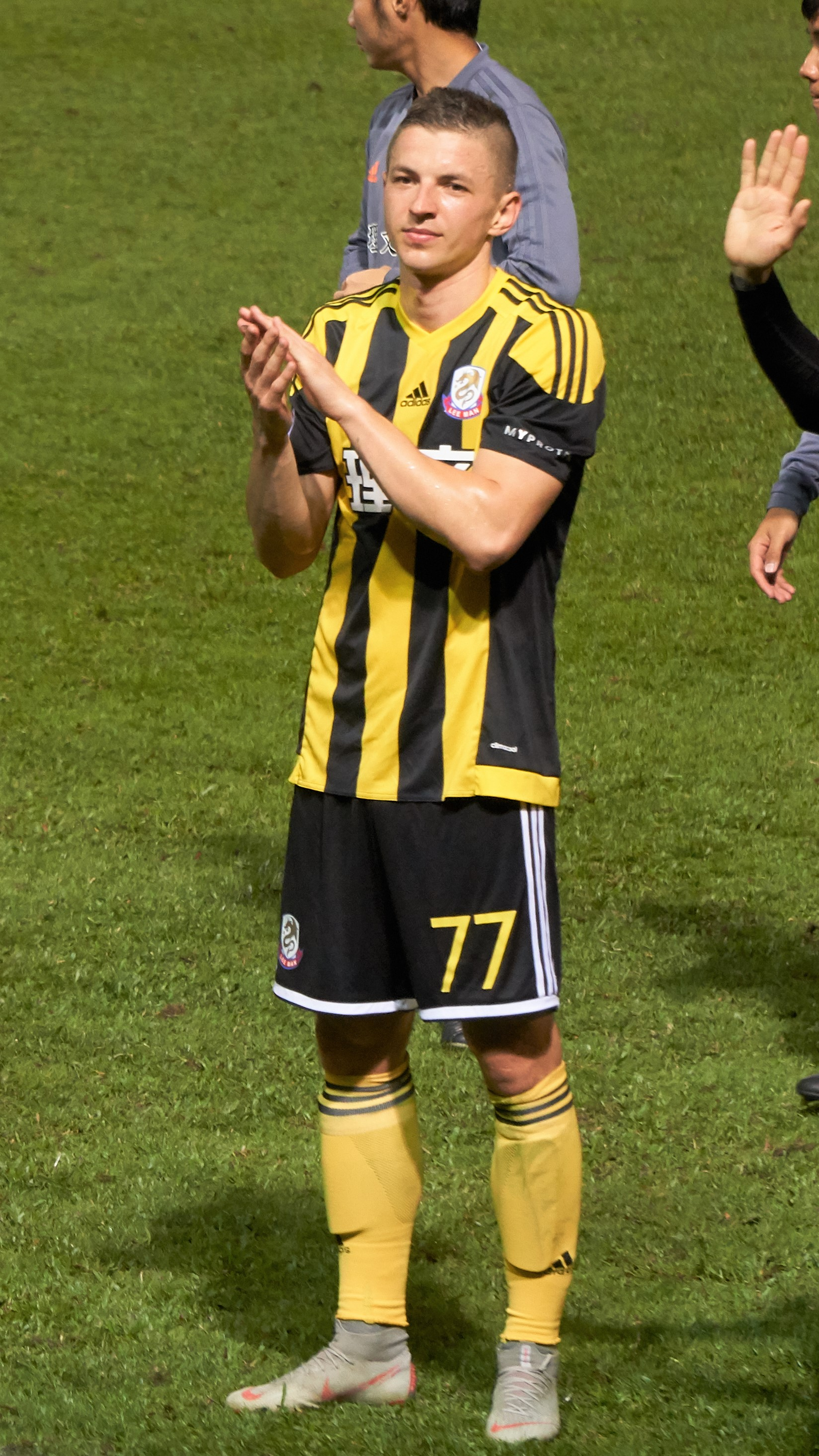

Personal information
- Full name: Serhiy Volodymyrovych Shapoval
- Date of birth: 7 February 1990 (age 36)
- Place of birth: Vorzel, Soviet Union (now Ukraine)
- Height: 1.80 m (5 ft 11 in)
- Position: Midfielder

Team information
- Current team: FV Neuenhain

Youth career
- 2003–2004: Lokomotyv Kyiv
- 2004–2005: Vidradnyi Kyiv
- 2005–2007: Obolon Kyiv

Senior career*
Years	Team	Apps	(Gls)
2007–2009	Nafkom Brovary	44	(3)
2010	Nyva Ternopil	6	(1)
2010	Feniks-Illichovets Kalinine	3	(1)
2011	Lviv	11	(1)
2011	Polonia 1912 Leszno	12	(7)
2012–2015	Tiraspol	86	(11)
2015	Chornomorets Odesa	7	(0)
2016–2018	Torpedo-BelAZ Zhodino	66	(3)
2018	Gomel	12	(2)
2019–2021	Lee Man	35	(4)
2021	Dinamo Brest	11	(0)
2022	Peremoha Dnipro	0	(0)
2022	Narew Ostrołęka	0	(0)
2022	Dalvík/Reynir	16	(0)
2023	FV Neuenhain		
- * Club domestic league appearances and goals as of 7 February 2024

Serhiy Volodymyrovych Shapoval (Ukrainian: Сергій Володимирович Шаповал; born 7 February 1990) is a Ukrainian professional footballer who plays as a midfielder for German club FV Neuenhain.

== Honours ==
FC Tiraspol

- Moldovan Cup: 2012–13

Lee Man

- Hong Kong Sapling Cup: 2018–19
