= Wang Zhenpeng (footballer) =

Hong Kong footballer (born 1984)

Wang Zhenpeng 王振鵬
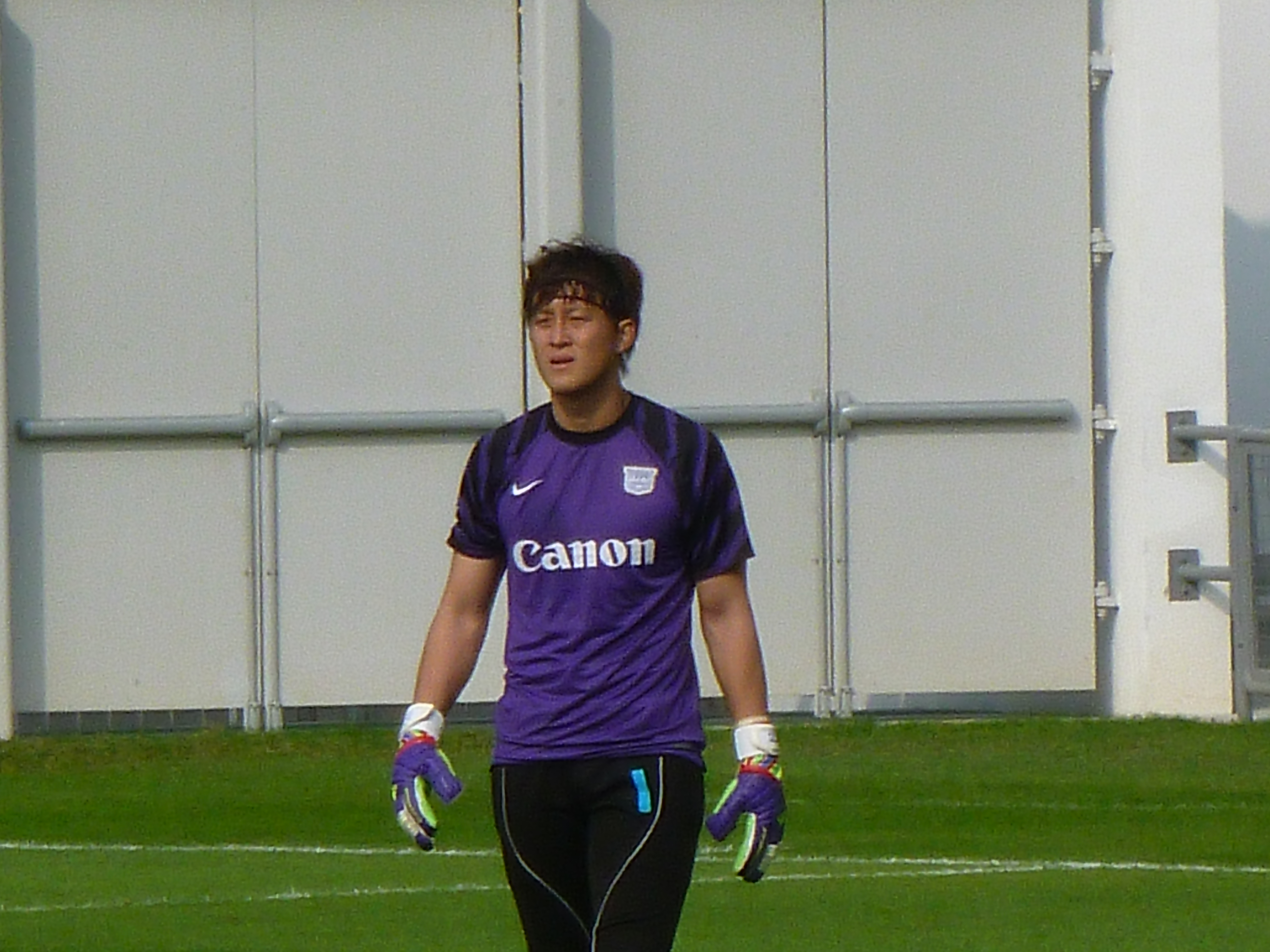

Personal information
- Full name: Wang Zhenpeng
- Date of birth: 5 May 1984 (age 42)
- Place of birth: Dalian, Liaoning, China
- Height: 1.92 m (6 ft 4 in)
- Position: Goalkeeper

Senior career*
Years	Team	Apps	(Gls)
2002–2005	Dalian Shide	0	(0)
2005–2026	Kitchee	237	(0)
2026–	Fu Moon	0	(0)

International career^{‡}
2016–2025	Hong Kong	8	(0)
- * Club domestic league appearances and goals as of 17 May 2026 ‡ National team caps and goals as of 17 May 2026

Wang Zhenpeng
- Traditional Chinese: 王振鵬
- Simplified Chinese: 王振鹏
Transcriptions
Standard Mandarin
- Hanyu Pinyin: Wáng Zhènpéng
- IPA: [wǎŋ ʈʂə̂n pʰə̌ŋ]
Yue: Cantonese
- Jyutping: Wong4 Zan3paang4
- IPA: [wɔŋ˩ tsɐn˧ pʰaŋ˩]

Wang Zhenpeng (traditional Chinese: 王振鵬; simplified Chinese: 王振鹏, born 5 May 1984) is a former professional footballer who played as a goalkeeper. Born in China, he played for the Hong Kong national team.

== Club career ==
=== Dalian Shide ===
Wang started his professional football career in 2002 when he was promoted to the senior team of top tier Chinese side Dalian Shide. Throughout the season, he was used as a third-choice goalkeeper and did not see any playing time. However, he did see his side win the 2002 league title that season and did pick up a medal. His time at Dalian, however would see him struggle to receive any playing time and he would even struggle to even maintain his third choice position within the team by the 2005 league season, which saw him dropped from the first team squad.

=== Kitchee ===
In 2005, Wang moved to Hong Kong-based club Kitchee and made his league debut on 18 September 2005 against Sun Hei in a 2–0 victory. As the season progressed, he went on to become the club's first-choice goalkeeper and play in twelve games at the end of the 2005–06 season that saw Kitchee win the Hong Kong Senior Challenge Shield, while also coming fourth within the league.

In the following season, Wang faced stiff competition from Hong Kong U-23 goalkeeper Li Jian and only played in ten league games. However, he was able to regain his place within the team and play in the final of the Hong Kong Senior Challenge Shield on 23 December 2007, but Wang did not have a good game and saw himself commit two goalkeeping mistakes that led to Kitchee losing 2–0 to Eastern. Despite the disappointment, Wang still remained as the club's main goalkeeper and play in the final that won the 2006–07 Hong Kong League Cup as well as starting the following season as the first choice where he played in fifteen league games throughout the 2007–08 season. By finishing in a disappointing sixth, the club's manager Julio César Moreno decided to drop Wang during the 2008–09 season and replaced him with Song Tao and Luciano, which saw Wang only play in six league games at the end of the season.

Kitchee brought in Josep Gombau as their new manager in the 2009–10 season, and he made Sergio Aure his first-choice goalkeeper. Wang played in only five league games throughout the season and sat on the bench as the club won the 2009 Hong Kong Community Shield. However, he regained his position as the club's main goalkeeper in the 2010–11 league season, which he played in all but one game throughout the season as Kitchee won the league title for the first time since 1964.

On 17 May 2026, after 21 years at the club, Wang announced his retirement from professional football.

== International career ==
On 3 June 2016, he made his international debut against Vietnam during the 2016 AYA Bank Cup.

== Career statistics ==
=== Club ===
Statistics accurate as of 17 May 2026

Club	Season	League			FA Cup		Senior Shield		League Cup		Continental		Other		Total	
Club	Season	Division	Apps	Goals	Apps	Goals	Apps	Goals	Apps	Goals	Apps	Goals	Apps	Goals	Apps	Goals
Dalian Shide	2002	Chinese Jia-A League	0	0	0	0	—	—	—	—	0	0	—	—	0	0
Dalian Shide	2003	Chinese Jia-A League	0	0	0	0	—	—	—	—	0	0	—	—	0	0
Dalian Shide	2004	Chinese Super League	0	0	0	0	—	—	—	—	0	0	—	—	0	0
Dalian Shide	2005	Chinese Super League	0	0	0	0	—	—	—	—	0	0	—	—	0	0
Kitchee	2005–06	Hong Kong First Division League	12	0	1	0	3	0	5	0	—	—	—	—	21	0
Kitchee	2006–07	Hong Kong First Division League	10	0	2	0	0	0	3	0	—	—	—	—	15	0
Kitchee	2007–08	Hong Kong First Division League	16	0	0	0	3	0	6	0	2 (Note: Appearances in the AFC Cup)	0	—	—	27	0
Kitchee	2008–09	Hong Kong First Division League	6	0	0	0	0	0	0	0	—	—	—	—	6	0
Kitchee	2009–10	Hong Kong First Division League	6	0	0	0	0	0	—	—	—	—	4 (Note: 1 appearance in 2009 Hong Kong Community Shield, 3 appearances in 2010 Singapore Cup)	0	10	0
Kitchee	2010–11	Hong Kong First Division League	17	0	1	0	1	0	1	0	—	—	—	—	20	0
Kitchee	2011–12	Hong Kong First Division League	18	0	0	0	2	0	3	0	7	0	—	—	30	0
Kitchee	2012–13	Hong Kong First Division League	14	0	0	0	2	0	—	—	8	0	—	—	24	0
Kitchee	2013–14	Hong Kong First Division League	16	0	1	0	1	0	—	—	9	0	—	—	27	0
Kitchee	2014–15	Hong Kong Premier League	11	0	1	0	1	0	2	0	7	0	—	—	22	0
Kitchee	2015–16	Hong Kong Premier League	13	0	1	0	2	0	5	0	8 (Note: 1 appearance in AFC Champions League qualification, 7 appearances in AFC Cup)	0	0 (Note: Appearances in the Hong Kong Sapling Cup)	0	29	0
Kitchee	2016–17	Hong Kong Premier League	17	0	0	0	3	0	—	—	2 (Note: 2 appearance in 2017 AFC Champions League qualification)	0	0	0	21	0
Kitchee	2017–18	Hong Kong Premier League	16	0	1	0	2	0	—	—	5 (Note: Appearances in the AFC Champions League)	0	0	0	24	0
Kitchee	2018–19	Hong Kong Premier League	15	0	2	0	3	0	—	—	4 (Note: 1 appearance in AFC Champions League qualification, 3 appearances in AFC Cup)	0	0	0	24	0
Kitchee	2019–20	Hong Kong Premier League	13	0	1	0	0	0	—	—	—	—	3	0	17	0
Kitchee	2020–21	Hong Kong Premier League	13	0	—	—	—	—	—	—	0	0	5	0	18	0
Kitchee	2021–22	Hong Kong Premier League	1	0	—	—	—	—	—	—	1	0	6	0	8	0
Kitchee	2022–23	Hong Kong Premier League	1	0	0	0	1	0	—	—	—	—	7	0	9	0
Kitchee	2023–24	Hong Kong Premier League	11	0	2	0	1	0	—	—	2	0	2	0	18	0
Kitchee	2024–25	Hong Kong Premier League	3	0	0	0	1	0	—	—	—	—	0	0	4	0
Kitchee	2025–26	Hong Kong Premier League	8	0	0	0	1	0	0	0	—	—	0	0	9	0
Total			237	0	13	0	27	0	25	0	55	0	27	0	384	0

=== International ===
As of matches played 18 November 2025

National team	Year	Apps	Goals
Hong Kong	2016	2	0
Hong Kong	2017	2	0
Hong Kong	2018	1	0
Hong Kong	2019	0	0
Hong Kong	2020	0	0
Hong Kong	2021	0	0
Hong Kong	2022	1	0
Hong Kong	2023	0	0
Hong Kong	2024	0	0
Hong Kong	2025	2	0
Total		8	0

== Honours ==
Dalian Shide

- Chinese Jia-A League/Chinese Super League: 2002, 2005
- Chinese FA Cup: 2005

Kitchee

- Hong Kong Premier League: 2014–15, 2016–17, 2017–18, 2019–20, 2020–21, 2022–23, 2025–26
- Hong Kong First Division: 2010–11, 2011–12, 2013–14
- Hong Kong Senior Shield: 2005–06, 2016–17, 2018–19, 2022–23, 2023–24
- Hong Kong FA Cup: 2011–12, 2012–13, 2014–15, 2016–17, 2017–18, 2018–19, 2022–23
- Hong Kong Sapling Cup: 2017–18, 2019–20
- Hong Kong League Cup: 2005–06, 2006–07, 2011–12, 2014–15, 2015–16
- Hong Kong Community Cup: 2016–17, 2017–18
- AFC Cup Play-off: 2015–16
- HKPLC Cup: 2023–24
