= Huang Yang =

Hong Kong footballer (born 1983)

Huang Yang 黄洋
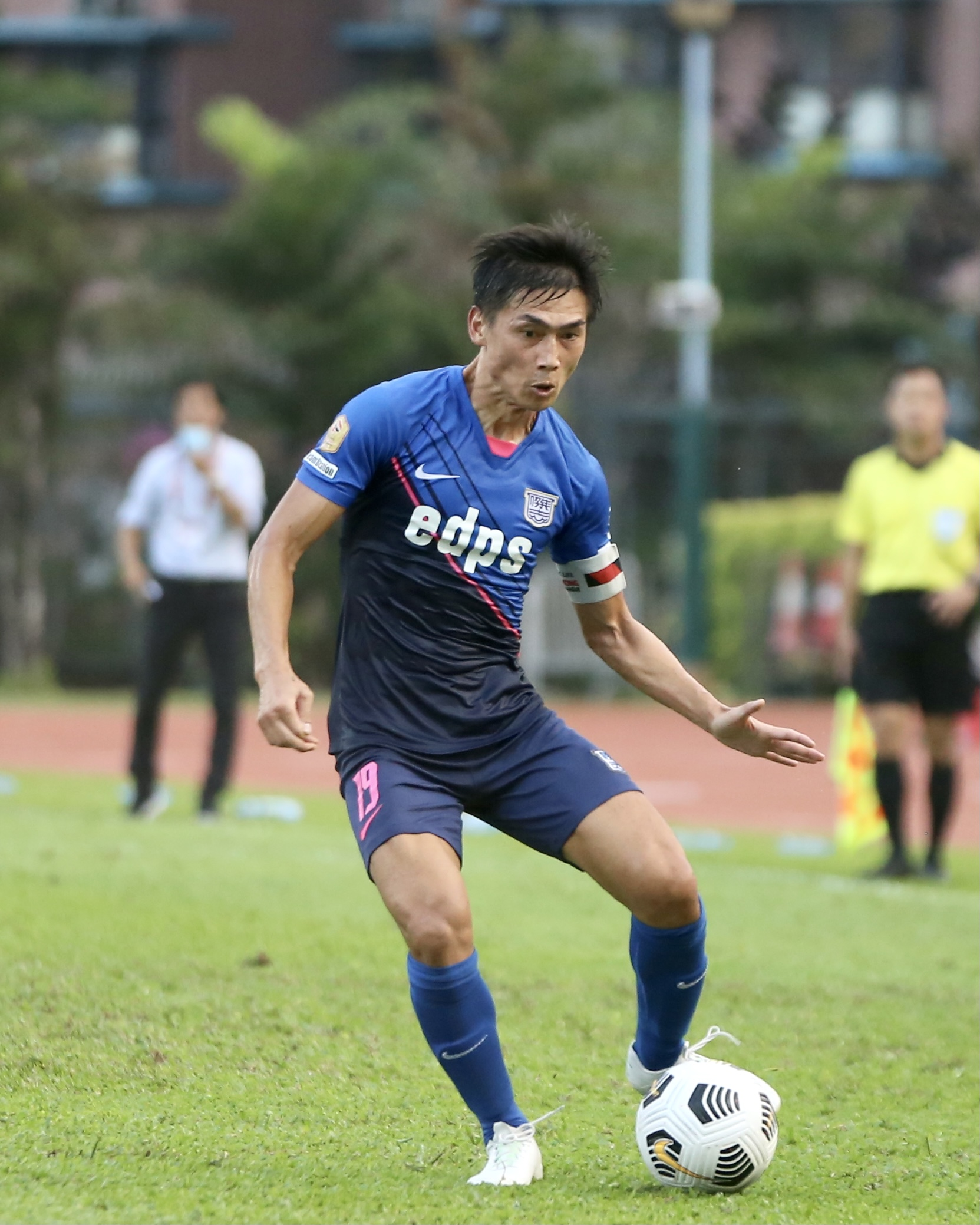
- Huang with Kitchee in 2021

Personal information
- Full name: Huang Yang
- Date of birth: 30 October 1983 (age 43)
- Place of birth: Shanghai, China
- Height: 1.76 m (5 ft 9 in)
- Position: Defensive midfielder

Youth career
- 1998–2000: Shanghai Shenhua
- 2000: São Paulo
- 2000: Portuguesa
- 2000–2005: Shanghai Shenhua

Senior career*
Years	Team	Apps	(Gls)
2005–2006	Shanghai Shenhua	0	(0)
2005–2006	→ Shanghai Qunying (loan)	24	(0)
2011–2024	Kitchee	170	(2)
Total		194	(2)

International career
2012–2023	Hong Kong	71	(1)

Managerial career
- 2023–2024: Kitchee (assistant coach)
- * Club domestic league appearances and goals

Huang Yang
- Traditional Chinese: 黃洋
- Simplified Chinese: 黄洋
Transcriptions
Standard Mandarin
- Hanyu Pinyin: Huáng Yáng
Yue: Cantonese
- Jyutping: wong^{4} joeng^{4}

Huang Yang (Chinese: 黄洋, born 30 October 1983) is a former professional footballer who played as a defensive midfielder. Born in China, he played for the Hong Kong national team.

Huang was the Hong Kong Footballer of the Year in 2013.

== Early career ==
Huang played for Shanghai Shenhua's youth academy when he was 15. He was a member of the team that trained in Brazil with São Paulo FC and Portuguesa. He played for China as captain at the 2005 Summer Universiade. and was loaned by Shenhua to Shanghai Qunying.

== University ==
Huang attended Donghua University and played football at the same time. When he graduated, he gave up professional football to start working. A year later, Donghua's football team re-called him as an alumnus when Hong Kong Polytechnic University (HKPU) arrived in Shanghai for a friendly. At the time, the HKPU wanted to recruit Chinese students with football talent and Huang thus joined to study at HKPU. In the three years since he joined, Hong Kong Polytechnic University won the University Sports Federation of Hong Kong's football competition twice, including in 2011 when Huang was captain and scored the winning penalty. After that, Huang completed his second degree and decided to join Kitchee to complete his unfinished dream.

== Club career ==
Huang finished his studies in the summer of 2011 and Kitchee recruited him for the 2011–12 Hong Kong First Division League season. As he has already spent 3 years in Hong Kong as a student, he could be registered as a local player. The first game he played for Kitchee was against Chelsea in the 2011 Barclays Asia Trophy. He was the player who managed Kitchee's only shot at the Chelsea goal. He then played in the third place play-off against Blackburn Rovers. He received good reviews from the fans despite the 0–3 loss. On 18 September 2011, he scored his first goal in Hong Kong in his club's 4–2 win over Tai Po.

On 4 January 2020, Huang made his 250th appearance for the club in the Sapling Cup match against Rangers.

On 26 May 2024, Huang made his final appearance for the club in the final match of the 2023–24 Hong Kong Premier League against Lee Man, and announced his retirement from professional football. The club retired his number 19 after the season.

== International career ==
On 2 February 2012, Huang was called up to the Hong Kong national team by Ernie Merrick for the friendly against Chinese Taipei. On 29 February 2012, he made his debut for Hong Kong against Chinese Taipei.

On 11 October 2016, Huang scored his first international goal for Hong Kong in the friendly against Singapore.

Starting from the 2019 EAFF E-1 Football Championship Round 2 in November 2018, Huang became the captain of Hong Kong.

On 14 January 2024, Huang announced his retirement from international football. Having earned 71 caps and scored one goal, Huang was one of the most capped players in the Hong Kong national team.

== Career statistics ==
=== Club ===
Club	Season	League			FA Cup		Senior Shield		Continental		Other		Total	
Club	Season	Division	Apps	Goals	Apps	Goals	Apps	Goals	Apps	Goals	Apps	Goals	Apps	Goals
Kitchee	2011–12	Hong Kong First Division League	17	1	3	1	2	0	6 (Note: Appearances in the AFC Cup)	0	2 (Note: Appearances in the Hong Kong League Cup)	0	30	2
Kitchee	2012–13	Hong Kong First Division League	16	1	5	1	2	0	8	0	2 (Note: Appearances in the 2012–13 Hong Kong season play-off)	1	33	3
Kitchee	2013–14	Hong Kong First Division League	19	0	3	0	1	0	9	0	0	0	32	0
Kitchee	2014–15	Hong Kong Premier League	15	0	1	0	3	0	9 (Note: Appearances in the AFC Champions League qualification & AFC Cup)	0	4	0	32	0
Kitchee	2015–16	Hong Kong Premier League	13	0	1	0	2	1	8	0	11 (Note: Appearances in the Hong Kong League Cup, Hong Kong Sapling Cup & 2015–16 Hong Kong season play-off)	0	35	1
Kitchee	2016–17	Hong Kong Premier League	19	0	3	0	3	0	2 (Note: Appearances in the AFC Champions League qualification)	0	0	0	27	0
Kitchee	2017–18	Hong Kong Premier League	16	0	3	0	1	0	4 (Note: Appearances in the AFC Champions League)	0	3 (Note: Appearances in the Hong Kong Sapling Cup)	0	27	0
Kitchee	2018–19	Hong Kong Premier League	14	0	3	0	2	0	7	0	2	0	28	0
Kitchee	2019–20	Hong Kong Premier League	15	0	1	0	1	0	—		6	0	23	0
Kitchee	2020–21	Hong Kong Premier League	9	0	—		—		5	0	5	0	19	0
Kitchee	2021–22	Hong Kong Premier League	4	0	1	0	—		4	0	1	0	10	0
Kitchee	2022–23	Hong Kong Premier League	3	0	1	0	2	0	—		5	0	11	0
Kitchee	2023–24	Hong Kong Premier League	10	0	1	0	0	0	2	0	5	0	18	0
Career total			170	2	26	2	21	1	67	0	41	1	317	6

=== International ===
National team	Year	Apps	Goals
Hong Kong	2012	10	0
Hong Kong	2013	6	0
Hong Kong	2014	8	0
Hong Kong	2015	5	0
Hong Kong	2016	6	1
Hong Kong	2017	8	0
Hong Kong	2018	5	0
Hong Kong	2019	9	0
Hong Kong	2020	0	0
Hong Kong	2021	3	0
Hong Kong	2022	6	0
Hong Kong	2023	5	0
Total		71	1

== Honours ==
Kitchee

- Hong Kong Premier League: 2014–15, 2016–17, 2017–18, 2019–20, 2020–21, 2022–23
- Hong Kong First Division: 2011–12, 2013–14
- Hong Kong Senior Shield: 2016–17, 2018–19, 2022–23, 2023–24
- Hong Kong FA Cup: 2011–12, 2012–13, 2014–15, 2016–17, 2017–18, 2018–19, 2022–23
- Hong Kong Sapling Cup: 2017–18, 2019–20
- Hong Kong League Cup: 2011–12, 2014–15, 2015–16
- Hong Kong Community Cup: 2016–17, 2017–18
- Hong Kong AFC Play-Off: 2015–16
- HKPLC Cup: 2023–24

Individual

- Hong Kong Footballer of the Year: 2013
- EAFF Championship Most Valuable Player: 2019

Sporting positions
Preceded by Yapp Hung Fai	Hong Kong national football team captain 2018–2023	Succeeded by Yapp Hung Fai
