= Ngan Cheuk Pan =

Hong Kong footballer

Ngan Cheuk Pan 顏卓彬
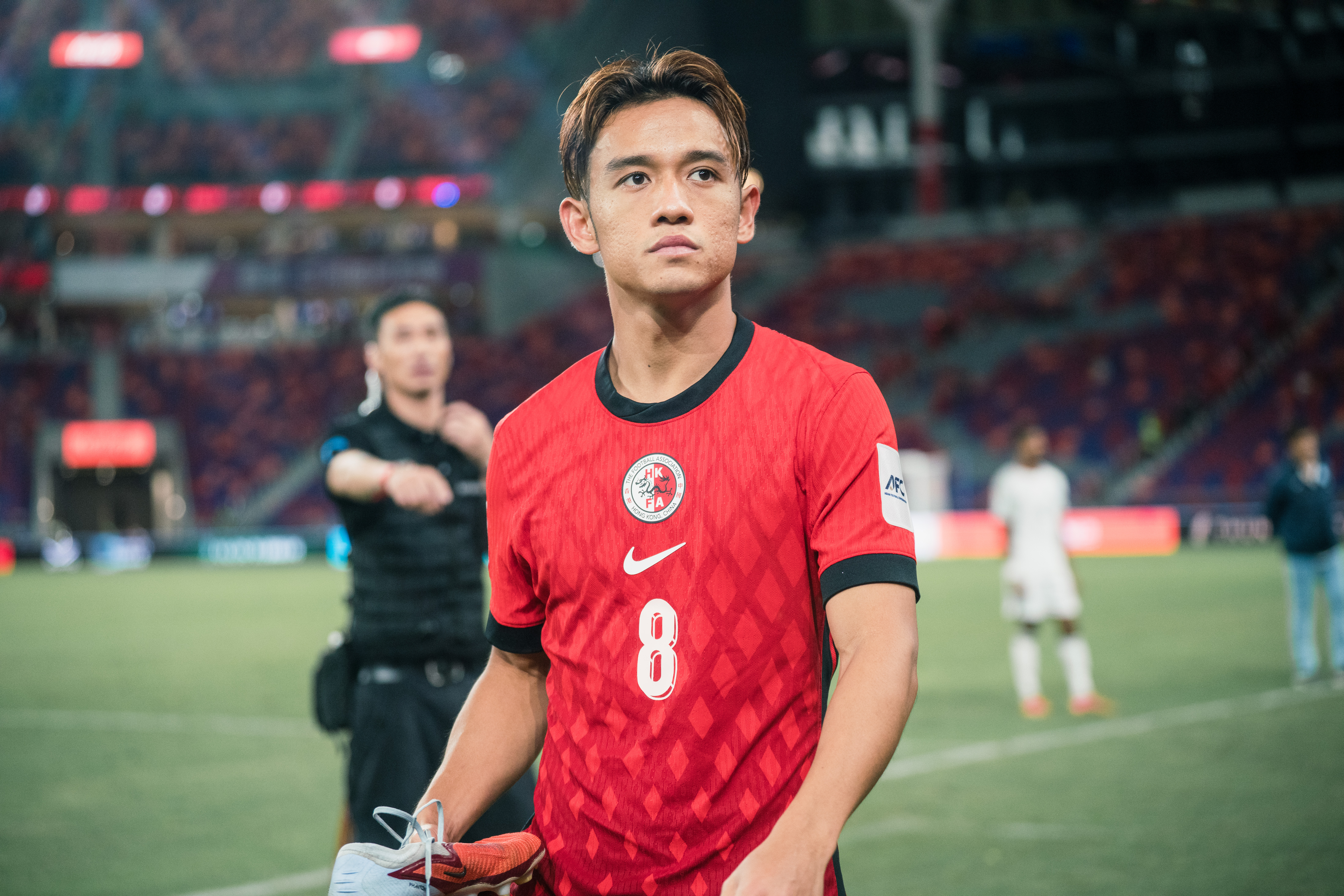

Personal information
- Full name: Ngan Cheuk Pan
- Date of birth: 22 January 1998 (age 28)
- Place of birth: Hong Kong
- Height: 1.72 m (5 ft 7 1/2 in)
- Position: Midfielder

Team information
- Current team: Qingdao Hainiu
- Number: 24

Youth career
- 2008–2015: Kitchee

College career
Years	Team	Apps	(Gls)
2017–2019	MidAmerica Nazarene	19	(1)
2019	St. Bonaventure	16	(0)

Senior career*
Years	Team	Apps	(Gls)
2015–2017	Kitchee	2	(0)
2020	Wong Tai Sin	1	(0)
2020–2021	Kitchee	5	(0)
2022–2025	Kitchee	35	(3)
2023–2024	→ Sham Shui Po (loan)	19	(0)
2025–2026	Tai Po	12	(0)
2026–	Qingdao Hainiu	16	(1)

International career^{‡}
2014	Hong Kong U-16	3	(0)
2019–	Hong Kong U-23	4	(0)
2023–	Hong Kong	28	(0)
Medal record
Men's football
Representing Hong Kong
FIFA ASEAN Challenge Cup
Winner	2026 Hong Kong
- * Club domestic league appearances and goals as of 8 November 2026 ‡ National team caps and goals as of 3 October 2026

Ngan Cheuk Pan (Chinese: 顏卓彬; born 22 January 1998) is a Hong Kong professional footballer who currently plays as a midfielder for Chinese Super League club Qingdao Hainiu and the Hong Kong national team.

== Amateur career ==
Ngan joined Kitchee's academy in 2008.

In 2017, Ngan chose to play collegiately for MidAmerica Nazarene. 2 years later, he transferred to St. Bonaventure for his junior season.

== Club career ==
=== Kitchee ===
In July 2015, Ngan was promoted to the first team of Kitchee. He made his HKPL debut for the club on 9 January 2016 in a match against Pegasus.

In July 2017, Ngan left the club to pursue his studies in the US.

On 2 July 2020, Kitchee announced an agreement for Ngan to join in November of the same year.

In July 2022, Ngan rejoined the club again.

=== Sham Shui Po ===
On 12 July 2023, Ngan joined Sham Shui Po on loan. Ngan shortly rejoined Kitchee for the final match of the 2023–24 HKPLC Cup, but returned to Sham Shui Po after the match.

=== Tai Po ===
On 18 July 2025, Ngan joined Tai Po.

=== Qingdao Hainiu ===
On 17 February 2026, Ngan joined Chinese Super League club Qingdao Hainiu. On 15 May 2026, he scored his first goal for the club in a 4-2 league defeat away against Beijing Guoan, with an effort from outside the box on the 93rd minute.

== International career ==
On 23 March 2023, Ngan made his international debut for Hong Kong in a friendly match against Singapore.

On 30 May 2025, Ngan was selected to play and start for Hong Kong in a friendly match against Manchester United.

In September 2025, Ngan was selected to play in 2025 King's Cup.

== Career statistics ==
=== Club ===
As of 2 July 2020

Club	Season	League			National Cup		Other Cups		Continental		Other		Total	
Club	Season	Division	Apps	Goals	Apps	Goals	Apps	Goals	Apps	Goals	Apps	Goals	Apps	Goals
Kitchee	2015–16	Hong Kong Premier League	2	0	0	0	1 (Note: Appearances in the League Cup)	0	4 (Note: Appearances in the AFC Champions League qualification & AFC Cup)	0	0	0	7	0
Kitchee	2016–17	Hong Kong Premier League	0	0	1	0	0	0	1 (Note: Appearances in the AFC Champions League qualification)	0	0	0	2	0
Wong Tai Sin	2019–20	Hong Kong First Division League	1	0	0	0	0	0	0	0	0	0	1	0
Kitchee	2020–21	Hong Kong Premier League	5	0	0	0	1	0	1	0	0	0	7	0
Career total			8	0	1	0	2	0	6	0	0	0	17	0

=== International ===
As of 3 October 2026

National team	Year	Apps	Goals
Hong Kong	2023	2	0
Hong Kong	2024	8	0
Hong Kong	2025	12	0
Hong Kong	2026	6	0
Total		28	0

#	Date	Venue	Opponent	Result	Competition
1	23 March 2023	Mong Kok Stadium, Mong Kok, Hong Kong	Singapore	1–1	Friendly
2	28 March 2023	Sultan Ibrahim Stadium, Johor, Malaysia	Malaysia	0–2	Friendly
3	6 June 2024	Hong Kong Stadium, So Kon Po, Hong Kong	Iran	2–4	2026 FIFA World Cup qualification – AFC second round

== Honours ==
=== Club ===
Kitchee

- Hong Kong Premier League: 2016–17, 2020–21, 2022–23
- Hong Kong FA Cup: 2016–17, 2022–23
- Hong Kong Senior Challenge Shield: 2016–17, 2022–23, 2023–24
- Hong Kong League Cup: 2015–16
- HKPLC Cup: 2023–24

=== International ===
Hong Kong

- FIFA ASEAN Challenge Cup: 2026
