= Fernando (footballer, born November 1986) =

Brazilian-born Hong Kong footballer (born 1980)

Fernando 費蘭度
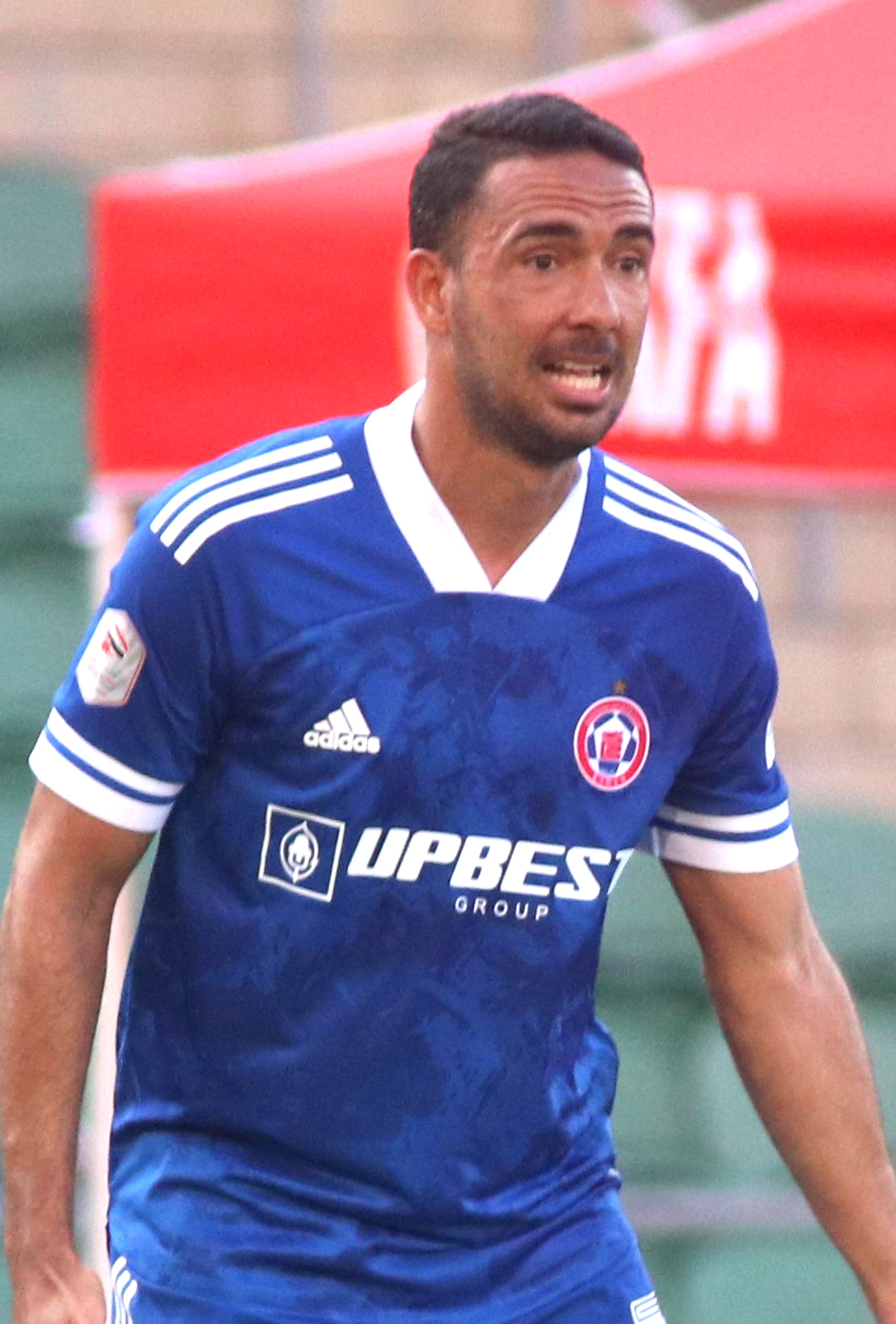

Personal information
- Full name: Fernando Augusto Azevedo Pedreira
- Date of birth: 14 November 1986 (age 40)
- Place of birth: Salvador, Brazil
- Height: 1.79 m (5 ft 10 in)
- Positions: Left winger; left back; libero

Team information
- Current team: Tai Po
- Number: 10

Senior career*
Years	Team	Apps	(Gls)
2010	Madre Deus	15	(1)
2010	CRB	3	(0)
2011	Guarani (MG)	10	(0)
2012	Juazeiro	7	(0)
2013	Jacuipense	7	(0)
2013–2014	Citizen	12	(2)
2014–2015	YFCMD	16	(5)
2015–2020	Kitchee	73	(20)
2020–2022	Eastern	19	(6)
2022–2025	Kitchee	52	(10)
2025–	Tai Po	25	(2)

International career^{‡}
2022–2025	Hong Kong	25	(1)

Managerial career
- 2025–: Tai Po (assistant coach)
- * Club domestic league appearances and goals as of 21 November 2026 ‡ National team caps and goals as of 14 October 2025

Fernando Augusto Azevedo Pedreira (born 14 November 1986), commonly known as Fernando (Chinese: 費蘭度), is a professional footballer who currently plays as a left winger or left back for Hong Kong Premier League club Tai Po. He is also the assistant coach of the club. Born in Brazil, he plays for the Hong Kong national team.

== Club career ==
Fernando joined Citizen from the Brazilian football scene in 2013. His first goal in for Citizen was against Tuen Mun on 19 October 2013 in a 4–1 victory. He recorded 2 goals from 14 appearances in all competitions in the 2013–14 season.

After Citizen declined to join the newly established Hong Kong Premier League from the 2014–15 season, Fernando joined YFCMD. He scored 8 goals across all competitions for the club, including a brace in the first round of the play-offs.

In June 2015, Fernando joined the reigning champions Kitchee. He was named Hong Kong's Footballer of the Year in 2017, and had subsequently been named in the Hong Kong Top Footballers Best XI for all four seasons as a Kitchee player.

On 1 July 2020, Eastern announced the signing of Fernando. He left the club on 9 July 2022.

On 25 July 2022, Fernando returned to Kitchee. He recorded his 200th appearance for Kitchee on 9 February 2025 in a 2–1 win against the Rangers at Tsing Yi Sports Ground.

On 17 July 2025, Fernando joined Tai Po.

== International career ==
On 21 February 2021, Fernando officially announced that he had received a Hong Kong passport, making him eligible to represent Hong Kong internationally. In the process, he denounced his Brazilian passport.

On 17 May 2021, Fernando received his first call-up to the Hong Kong national football team to play against Iran, Iraq and Bahrain for the 2022 World Cup qualifiers. However, he withdrew from the squad due to injury on 25 May 2021.

On 1 June 2022, Fernando made his international debut for Hong Kong in a friendly match against Malaysia. His first international goal comes against Brunei in a 10–0 victory at the Hong Kong Stadium on 11 September 2023.

== Career statistics ==
=== Club ===
As of 13 May 2023.

Club	Season	League			FA Cup		Senior Shield		Continental		Other		Total	
Club	Season	Division	Apps	Goals	Apps	Goals	Apps	Goals	Apps	Goals	Apps	Goals	Apps	Goals
Citizen	2013–14	Hong Kong First Division	12	2	1	0	1	0	–		0	0	14	2
YFCMD	2014–15	Hong Kong Premier League	16	5	3	1	1	0	–		4 (Note: Appearances in the Hong Kong League Cup & Hong Kong season play-off)	2	24	8
Kitchee	2015–16	Hong Kong Premier League	14	3	1	0	2	0	1 (Note: Appearances in the AFC Champions League qualification)	0	8 (Note: Appearances in the Hong Kong League Cup, Hong Kong Sapling Cup & Hong Kong season play-off)	1	26	4
Kitchee	2016–17	Hong Kong Premier League	17	3	1	0	3	0	2	0	1 (Note: Appearances in the Hong Kong Sapling Cup)	0	24	3
Kitchee	2017–18	Hong Kong Premier League	18	5	2	2	2	1	6 (Note: Appearances in the AFC Champions League)	0	5	3	33	11
Kitchee	2018–19	Hong Kong Premier League	16	7	3	2	3	1	7 (Note: Appearances in the AFC Cup & AFC Champions League qualification)	6	3	2	32	18
Kitchee	2019–20	Hong Kong Premier League	8	2	1	0	1	0	0	0	5	5	15	7
Kitchee	Total		73	20	8	4	11	2	16	6	22	11	130	43
Eastern	2020–21	Hong Kong Premier League	15	5	–		–		0	0	3	0	18	5
Eastern	2021–22	Hong Kong Premier League	4	1	1	0	–		2 (Note: Appearances in the AFC Cup)	0	2	0	9	0
Eastern	Total		19	6	1	0	–		2	0	5	0	27	5
Kitchee	2022–23	Hong Kong Premier League	18	3	3	1	4	0	1	0	5	0	31	4
Career total			149	31	16	6	17	2	19	6	35	13	211	57

=== International ===
As of 18 November 2025

National team	Year	Apps	Goals
Hong Kong	2022	3	0
Hong Kong	2023	5	1
Hong Kong	2024	7	0
Hong Kong	2025	10	0
Total		25	1

#	Date	Venue	Opponent	Result	Competition
1	1 June 2022	National Stadium Bukit Jalil, Kuala Lumpur, Malaysia	Malaysia	0–2	Friendly
2	21 September 2022	Mong Kok Stadium, Mong Kok, Hong Kong	Myanmar	2–0	Friendly
3	24 September 2022	Hong Kong Stadium, So Kon Po, Hong Kong	Myanmar	0–0	Friendly
4	7 September 2023	Phnom Penh Olympic Stadium, Phnom Penh, Hong Kong	Cambodia	1–1	Friendly
5	11 September 2023	Hong Kong Stadium, So Kon Po, Hong Kong	Brunei	10–0	Friendly
6	12 October 2023	Hong Kong Stadium, So Kon Po, Hong Kong	Bhutan	4–0	2026 FIFA World Cup qualification – AFC first round
7	17 October 2023	Changlimithang Stadium, Thimphu, Bhutan	Bhutan	0–2	2026 FIFA World Cup qualification – AFC first round
8	21 November 2023	Hong Kong Stadium, So Kon Po, Hong Kong	Turkmenistan	2–2	2026 FIFA World Cup qualification – AFC second round

==== International goals ====
No.	Date	Venue	Opponent	Score	Result	Competition
1.	11 September 2023	Hong Kong Stadium, So Kon Po, Hong Kong	Brunei	4–0	10–0	Friendly

== Honours ==
Kitchee

- Hong Kong Premier League: 2016–17, 2017–18, 2019–20, 2020–21, 2022–23
- Hong Kong Senior Shield: 2016–17, 2018–19, 2022–23, 2023–24
- Hong Kong FA Cup: 2016–17, 2017–18, 2018–19, 2022–23
- Hong Kong Sapling Cup: 2017–18, 2019–20
- Hong Kong League Cup: 2015–16
- HKPLC Cup: 2023–24

Eastern

- Hong Kong Sapling Cup: 2020–21

Tai Po

- Hong Kong FA Cup: 2025–26
- Hong Kong Senior Shield: 2025–26

Individual

- Hong Kong Footballer of the Year: 2017
