= Mikael (footballer, born 1993) =

Brazilian footballer

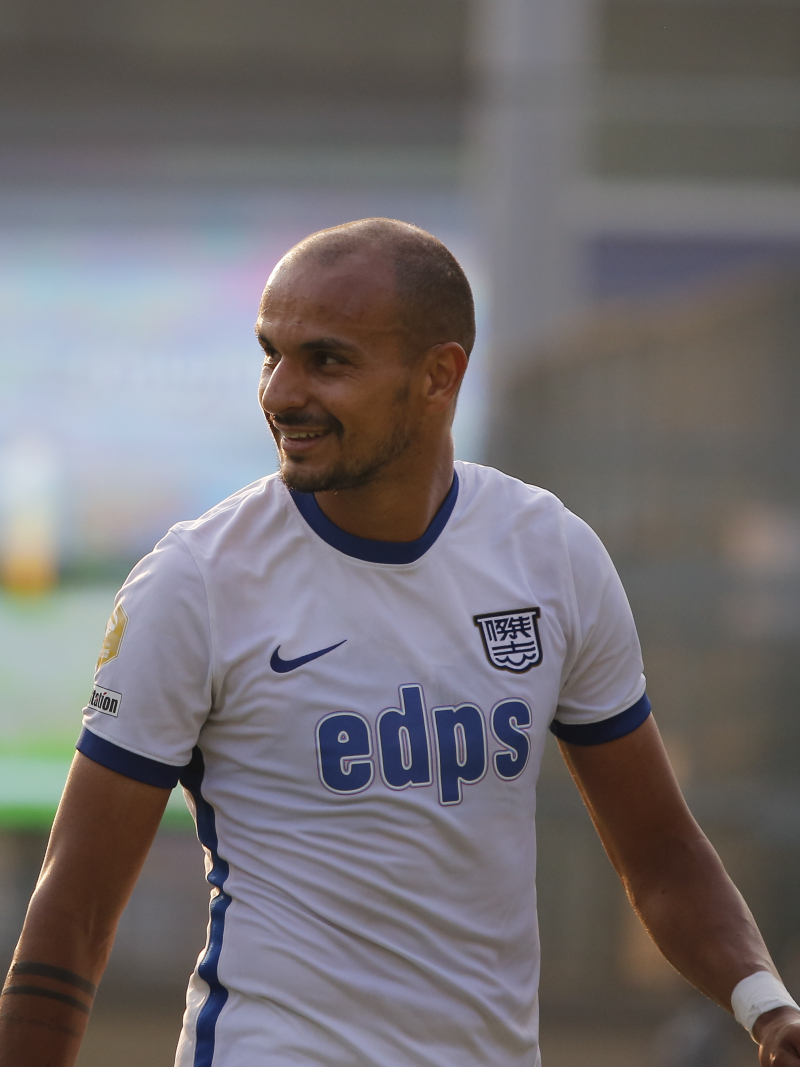
- Mikael with Kitchee in 2023

Personal information
- Full name: Mikael Severo Burkatt
- Date of birth: 26 April 1993 (age 33)
- Place of birth: São Leopoldo, Brazil
- Height: 1.80 m (5 ft 11 in)
- Position: Attacking midfielder

Team information
- Current team: Kowloon City
- Number: 7

Youth career
- Grêmio

Senior career*
Years	Team	Apps	(Gls)
2014	Lajeadense	7	(0)
2015	Aimoré	13	(2)
2015	Boa Esporte	2	(0)
2015	Pelotas	0	(0)
2016	Uberlândia	9	(1)
2016	Ypiranga-RS	17	(0)
2017	Passo Fundo	8	(0)
2017	Remo-PA	6	(1)
2018	São Luiz	10	(0)
2018	Caxias	1	(0)
2019	São Luiz	14	(2)
2019	América-RN	7	(0)
2019–2020	Yuen Long	9	(2)
2020–2021	Happy Valley	14	(4)
2021–2022	Eastern	4	(1)
2022–2024	Kitchee	35	(25)
2024–2025	Emirates		
2025–2026	Lee Man	21	(7)
2026–	Kowloon City	2	(0)
- * Club domestic league appearances and goals as of 30 October 2026

Mikael Severo Burkatt (born 26 April 1993), commonly known as Mikael, is a Brazilian professional footballer who currently plays as an attacking midfielder for Hong Kong Premier League club Kowloon City.

== Club career ==
On 10 August 2019, Mikael was named as a player for Hong Kong Premier League club Yuen Long.

On 3 June 2020, Happy Valley officially announced the signing of Mikael.

On 9 August 2021, it was announced that Mikael had joined Eastern. He left the club on 9 July 2022.

On 12 July 2022, it was announced that Mikael had joined Kitchee.

On 11 July 2025, Mikael returned to Hong Kong and joined Lee Man.

On 18 September 2026, Mikael joined Kowloon City.

== Honours ==
=== Club ===
Kitchee

- Hong Kong Premier League: 2022–23
- Hong Kong Senior Challenge Shield: 2022–23, 2023–24
- Hong Kong FA Cup: 2022–23
- HKPLC Cup: 2023–24

Lee Man

- Hong Kong League Cup: 2025–26
