= Andy Russell (footballer, born 1987) =

Hong Kong footballer (born 1987)

Personal information
- Full name: Andrew James Russell
- Date of birth: 21 November 1987 (age 38)
- Place of birth: Southampton, England
- Height: 1.91 m (6 ft 3 in)
- Positions: Centre back; forward

Team information
- Current team: Hoi King

Youth career
- 2003–2005: HKFC

Senior career*
Years	Team	Apps	(Gls)
2008–2009	Happy Valley	12	(0)
2009–2010	Mossley		
2010	Chorley		
2013–2014	AFC Fylde		
2014–2016	South China	26	(2)
2017	Penang	8	(0)
2017–2018	Tai Po	11	(0)
2018	Liaoning Whowin	27	(4)
2019–2020	Hebei China Fortune	6	(0)
2020	→ Jiangxi Liansheng (loan)	16	(1)
2021	Jiangxi Beidamen	28	(2)
2022	Sichuan Jiuniu	19	(0)
2023–2024	Kitchee	21	(2)
2024–2025	HKFC	20	(2)
2025–	Hoi King	17	(8)

International career^{‡}
2016–2023	Hong Kong	22	(0)
- * Club domestic league appearances and goals as of 16 May 2026 ‡ National team caps and goals as of 17 October 2023

Andrew James Russell (Chinese: 羅素; born 21 November 1987) is a former professional footballer who plays as a centre back for Hong Kong First Division club Hoi King. Born in England, he played for the Hong Kong national football team from 2016 to 2023.

== Club career ==
In 2008, Russell signed his first contract as a professional footballer for Happy Valley, which played in the Hong Kong First Division. After returning to the UK, Russell joined Mossley in the Northern Premier League Division One North and found employment with Adidas. In his debut season with the club, he represented them 46 times and scored two goals. He joined Chorley in 2010 when manager Garry Flitcroft took over. For the 2013–14 season, Russell chose to join AFC Fylde after being convinced by manager Dave Challinor. He helped the club retain the Lancashire FA Challenge Trophy by beating Chorley 4–1 with one goal and one assist.

In July 2014, Russell signed for Hong Kong Premier League club South China.

On 7 January 2017, Russell left South China for Malaysia Super League club Penang after signing a one-year contract with the club. In May 2017, Russell's contract with Penang was terminated due to poor performances.

On 27 February 2018, Russell left Tai Po, where he had played for the past half-year, for China League One club Liaoning Whowin at a six-figure fee, where he could play as a native player.

On 25 February 2019, Russell signed with Chinese Super League club Hebei China Fortune.

On 16 July 2020, Russell joined China League One club Jiangxi Liansheng on loan.

On 2 May 2022, Russell joined Sichuan Jiuniu.

On 8 February 2023, Russell returned to Hong Kong and joined Kitchee.

On 31 July 2024, Russell returned to HKFC.

On 6 September 2026, Russell joined Hong Kong First Division side Sham Shui Po as Vice Captain.

== International career ==
On 14 March 2016, Russell received his first call-up for Hong Kong in preparation for a 2018 FIFA World Cup qualification match against Qatar on 24 March 2016. He made his international debut in a 2–0 loss to Qatar.

On 6 November 2023, Russell announced his retirement from international football to focus more on his club career with Kitchee and family commitments.

== Personal life ==
Russell was born in Southampton, England, and moved to Hong Kong with his parents when he was 18 months old. He returned to England to attend the University of Manchester.

Russell married his wife Helen in 2018. The couple has a son named Zachary.

== Career statistics ==
=== Club ===
As of 26 May 2024

Appearances and goals by club, season and competition
Club	Season	League			National Cup		League Cup		Continental		Other		Total	
Club	Season	Division	Apps	Goals	Apps	Goals	Apps	Goals	Apps	Goals	Apps	Goals	Apps	Goals
South China	2014–15	Hong Kong Premier League	10	2	2	0	2	0	0	0	3 (Note: One appearance and one goal in Hong Kong Senior Challenge Shield, Two appearances in 2014–15 Hong Kong season play-off)	1	17	3
South China	2015–16	Hong Kong Premier League	12	0	0	0	6	1	0	0	8 (Note: Two appearances in Hong Kong Senior Challenge Shield, One appearance in 2015–16 Hong Kong season play-off, Five appearances in Hong Kong Sapling Cup)	0	26	1
South China	2016–17	Hong Kong Premier League	4	0	0	0	–		–		1 (Note: Appearances in Hong Kong Senior Challenge Shield)	0	5	0
South China	Total		26	2	2	0	8	1	0	0	12	1	48	4
Pulau Pinang	2017	Malaysia Super League	8	0	2	0	–		–		–		10	0
Tai Po	2017–18	Hong Kong Premier League	11	0	0	0	–		–		3 (Note: One appearance in Hong Kong Senior Challenge Shield, Two appearances and one goal in Hong Kong Sapling Cup)	1	14	1
Liaoning Whowin	2018	China League One	27	4	0	0	–		–		–		27	4
Hebei China Fortune	2019	Chinese Super League	6	0	0	0	–		–		–		6	0
Jiangxi Liansheng (loan)	2020	China League One	14	1	0	0	–		–		2 (Note: Appearances in China League One relegation play-offs)	0	16	1
Jiangxi Beidamen	2021	China League One	28	2	0	0	–		–		0	0	28	2
Sichuan Jiuniu	2022	China League One	19	0	0	0	–		–		0	0	19	0
Kitchee	2022–23	Hong Kong Premier League	6	1	2	0	–		–		2 (Note: Two appearances and one goal in Hong Kong Sapling Cup)	1	10	2
Kitchee	2023–24	Hong Kong Premier League	15	1	1	0	–		5	0	11 (Note: Three appearances and one goal in Hong Kong Senior Challenge Shield, Eight appearances and three goals in Hong Kong Sapling Cup)	4	32	5
Kitchee	Total		21	2	3	0	0	0	5	0	13	5	42	7
Career total			160	11	7	0	13	1	0	0	30	7	210	19

=== International ===
As of 17 October 2023

National team	Year	Apps	Goals
Hong Kong	2016	6	0
Hong Kong	2017	2	0
Hong Kong	2018	6	0
Hong Kong	2019	6	0
Hong Kong	2020	0	0
Hong Kong	2021	0	0
Hong Kong	2022	0	0
Hong Kong	2023	2	0
Total		22	0

#	Date	Venue	Opponent	Result	Competition
1	24 March 2016	Jassim Bin Hamad Stadium, Doha, Qatar	Qatar	0–2	2018 FIFA World Cup qualification
2	3 June 2016	Thuwunna Stadium, Yangon, Myanmar	Vietnam	2–2	2016 AYA Bank Cup
3	6 June 2016	Thuwunna Stadium, Yangon, Myanmar	Myanmar	0–3	2016 AYA Bank Cup
4	6 October 2016	Olympic Stadium, Phnom Penh, Cambodia	Cambodia	2–0	Friendly
5	11 October 2016	Mong Kok Stadium, Mong Kok, Hong Kong	Singapore	2–0	Friendly
6	6 November 2016	Mong Kok Stadium, Mong Kok, Hong Kong	Guam	3–2	EAFF E-1 Football Championship 2017 Round 2
7	9 November 2017	Mong Kok Stadium, Mong Kok, Hong Kong	Bahrain	0–2	Friendly
8	14 November 2017	Hong Kong Stadium, So Kon Po, Hong Kong	Lebanon	0–1	2019 AFC Asian Cup qualification
9	27 March 2018	Kim Il-sung Stadium, Pyongyang, North Korea	North Korea	0–2	2019 AFC Asian Cup qualification
10	11 October 2018	Mong Kok Stadium, Mong Kok, Hong Kong	Thailand	0–1	Friendly
11	16 October 2018	Wibawa Mukti Stadium, Cikarang, Indonesia	Indonesia	1–1	Friendly
12	11 November 2018	Taipei Municipal Stadium, Taipei, Taiwan	Chinese Taipei	2–1	2019 EAFF E-1 Football Championship Round 2
13	13 November 2018	Taipei Municipal Stadium, Taipei, Taiwan	North Korea	0–0	2019 EAFF E-1 Football Championship Round 2
14	16 November 2018	Taipei Municipal Stadium, Taipei, Taiwan	Mongolia	1–5	2019 EAFF E-1 Football Championship Round 2
15	11 June 2019	Mong Kok Stadium, Mong Kok, Hong Kong	Chinese Taipei	0–2	Friendly
16	5 September 2019	Phnom Penh Olympic Stadium, Phnom Penh, Cambodia	Cambodia	1–1	2022 FIFA World Cup qualification
17	10 September 2019	Hong Kong Stadium, So Kon Po, Hong Kong	Iran	0–2	2022 FIFA World Cup qualification
18	10 October 2019	Basra International Stadium, Basra, Iraq	Iraq	0–2	2022 FIFA World Cup qualification
19	14 November 2019	Hong Kong Stadium, So Kon Po, Hong Kong	Bahrain	0–0	2022 FIFA World Cup qualification
20	19 November 2019	Hong Kong Stadium, So Kon Po, Hong Kong	Cambodia	2–0	2022 FIFA World Cup qualification
21	7 September 2023	National Olympic Stadium, Phnom Penh, Cambodia	Cambodia	1–1	Friendly
22	17 October 2023	Changlimithang Stadium, Thimphu, Bhutan	Bhutan	0–2	2026 FIFA World Cup qualification

== Honours ==
=== Kitchee ===
- Hong Kong Premier League: 2022–23
- Hong Kong Senior Challenge Shield: 2022–23, 2023–24
- Hong Kong FA Cup: 2022–23
- HKPLC Cup: 2023–24
