= 2022–23 Hong Kong FA Cup =

Tournament details
- Country: Hong Kong
- Dates: 2 October 2022 – 13 May 2023
- Teams: 10

Final positions
- Champions: Kitchee (7th title)
- Runners-up: Rangers

Tournament statistics
- Matches played: 9
- Goals scored: 35 (3.89 per match)
- Attendance: 10,177 (1,131 per match)
- Top goal scorer(s): Cleiton (4 goals)

Awards
- Best player: Cleiton

The 2022–23 Hong Kong FA Cup was the 48th edition of the Hong Kong FA Cup. 10 teams entered this edition. The competition is only open to clubs who participate in the 2022–23 Hong Kong Premier League, with lower division sides entering the Junior Division, a separate competition. The winners of this year's FA Cup qualified for the 2023–24 AFC Champions League qualifying play-off.

Since the previous edition of the FA Cup was cancelled due to COVID-19 pandemic in Hong Kong, Eastern, the champions of the 2019–20 Hong Kong FA Cup remain the defending champions of the competition, but were eliminated in the semi-finals.

Kitchee became the champions for the seventh time after beating Rangers in the final.

As the 2022–23 Hong Kong Premier League title holders, Kitchee has qualified for the 2023–24 AFC Champions League group stage as league winners. The 2023–24 AFC Champions League qualifying play-off position went to the third-placed HKPL team Rangers.

== Calendar ==
Phase	Round	Draw Date	Date	Matches	Clubs
Knockout phase	First round	20 August 2022	2 – 8 October 2022	2	10 → 8
Knockout phase	Quarter-finals	20 August 2022	3 December 2022 – 7 January 2023	4	8 → 4
Knockout phase	Semi-finals	20 August 2022	29 April 2023 – 1 May 2023	2	4 → 2
Knockout phase	Final	20 August 2022	13 May 2023	1	2 → 1

== Bracket ==
First round
**Southern**	**6**
HK U23	1
Resources Capital	1
**HKFC (a.e.t.)**	**2***

Quarter-finals
Lee Man	0
**Southern**	**2**
**Rangers**	**1**
Tai Po	0
**Eastern**	**3**
HKFC	0
**Kitchee**	**4**
Sham Shui Po	1

Semi-finals
Southern	1
**Rangers**	**2**
Eastern	1
**Kitchee (a.e.t.)**	**2***

Final
Rangers	1
**Kitchee**	**7**

Bold = winner
* = after extra time, ( ) = penalty shootout score

== Fixtures and results ==
Times are in Hong Kong Time (UTC+08:00).

=== First round ===
2 October 2022	Resources Capital	**1–2** (a.e.t.)	**HKFC**	Mong Kok
15:00	Harima 87'	Report	Merkies 35'; McMillan 116'	Stadium: Mong Kok Stadium; Attendance: 766; Referee: Yu Kin Fung

8 October 2022	**Southern**	**6–1**	HK U23	Mong Kok
18:00	Lee Ka Yiu 23'; Chan Yun Tung 34' (o.g.); Awal 53', 73'; Sasaki 62' (pen.), 85'	Report	Law Hiu Chung 41'	Stadium: Mong Kok Stadium; Attendance: 427; Referee: Liu Kwok Man

=== Quarter-finals ===
3 December 2022	**Kitchee**	**4–1**	Sham Shui Po	Mong Kok
18:00	Damjanović 42'; Poon Pui Hin 47'; Fernando 70'; Cleiton 90+4'	Report	Lai Kak Yi 52'	Stadium: Mong Kok Stadium; Attendance: 497; Referee: Luk Kin Sun

10 December 2022	Lee Man	**0–2**	**Southern**	Tsing Yi
18:00		Report	Pereira 53'; Awal 65'	Stadium: Tsing Yi Sports Ground; Attendance: 431; Referee: Yu Kin Fung

17 December 2022	**Rangers**	**1–0**	Tai Po	Tsing Yi
15:00	Juninho 24'	Report		Stadium: Tsing Yi Sports Ground; Attendance: 298; Referee: Liu Kwok Man

7 January 2023	**Eastern**	**3–0**	HKFC	Mong Kok
18:00	Sun Ming Him 12'; Kozubayev 41'; Wu Chun Ming 62'	Report		Stadium: Mong Kok Stadium; Attendance: 644; Referee: Wong Wai Lun

=== Semi-finals ===
29 April 2023	Southern	**1–2**	**Rangers**	Mong Kok
15:00	Pereira 55'	Report	Kim Min-kyu 66'; Juninho 87' (pen.)	Stadium: Mong Kok Stadium; Attendance: 1,251; Referee: Liu Kwok Man

1 May 2023	Eastern	**1–2** (a.e.t.)	**Kitchee**	Mong Kok
15:00	Bertomeu 14' (pen.)	Report	Alex 67'; Mikael 116' (pen.)	Stadium: Mong Kok Stadium; Attendance: 2,780; Referee: Luk Kin Sun

=== Final ===
13 May 2023	Rangers	**1–7**	**Kitchee**	Mong Kok
15:00 UTC+8	Park Jong-bum 42'	Report	Scott 30', 60'; Cleiton 39', 72', 76'; Poon Pui Hin 45+2'; Mikael 58'	Stadium: Mong Kok Stadium; Attendance: 3,083; Referee: Liu Kwok Man

== Final ==
13 May 2023
15:00 UTC+8

Rangers	1–7	Kitchee
Park Jong-bum 42'	Report	Scott 30', 60'; Cleiton 39', 72', 76'; Poon Pui Hin 45+2'; Mikael 58'

Mong Kok Stadium
Attendance: 3,083
Referee: Liu Kwok Man

**Rangers**	**Kitchee**

GK	11	(Hong Kong) Leung Hing Kit
CB	4	(South Korea) Kim Min-kyu
CB	6	(South Korea) Park Jong-bum
CM	10	(Hong Kong) Lam Ka Wai (c)		(substituted off) 67'
RB	12	(Hong Kong) Lo Kwan Yee
CM	16	(Hong Kong) Lam Hin Ting	(yellow card) 71'	(substituted off) 82'
LB	19	(Hong Kong) Yiu Ho Ming		(substituted off) 46'
CF	21	(Ghana) Nassam Ibrahim		(substituted off) 82'
RM	44	(Japan) Yumemi Kanda
CB	55	(Hong Kong) Jean-Jacques Kilama		(substituted off) 73'
CF	90	(Brazil) Juninho
Substitutes:
GK	1	(Hong Kong) Lo Siu Kei
DF	2	(Hong Kong) Yeung Hok Man
CF	7	(Hong Kong) Lau Chi Lok		(substituted on) 46'
CF	9	(Hong Kong) Lam Hok Hei
CM	14	(Hong Kong) Yu Joy Yin		(substituted on) 73'
DF	17	(Hong Kong) Loong Tsz Hin
MF	18	(Hong Kong) Yeung Dik Lun
DF	23	(Hong Kong) Tse Wai Chun		(substituted on) 82'
MF	25	(Hong Kong) Ma Man Ching
MF	29	(Hong Kong) Lui Cheuk Kan
DF	33	(Brazil) Fernando Lopes		(substituted on) 82'
DF	94	(Hong Kong) Marco Wegener		(substituted on) 67'
Co-head coaches:
(Hong Kong) Chiu Chung Man (Hong Kong) Wong Chin Hung (Hong Kong) Lai Ka Fai (Hong Kong) Poon Man Chun

GK	86	(Hong Kong) Paulo César
RW	2	(Hong Kong) Law Tsz Chun		(substituted off) 70'
DM	4	(England) Charlie Scott
CB	5	(Hong Kong) Hélio (c)
LW	8	(Brazil) Igor Sartori		(substituted off) 77'
CM	10	(Brazil) Cleiton	(yellow card) 7'	(substituted off) 77'
RB	15	(Hong Kong) Roberto		(substituted off) 77'
CM	17	(Brazil) Mikael
CB	18	(Hong Kong) Oliver Gerbig
LB	77	(Hong Kong) Fernando
CF	99	(Hong Kong) Poon Pui Hin		(substituted off) 65'
Substitutes:
GK	1	(Hong Kong) Wang Zhenpeng
RB	11	(Kyrgyzstan) Bekzhan Sagynbayev		(substituted on) 70'
DM	19	(Hong Kong) Huang Yang
AM	20	(Hong Kong) Sohgo Ichikawa
RB	22	(France) Clement Benhaddouche		(substituted on) 77'
LB	23	(Hong Kong) Jordon Brown
CM	24	(Hong Kong) Ngan Cheuk Pan		(substituted on) 77'
CB	26	(Hong Kong) Andy Russell		(substituted on) 77'
AM	28	(Hong Kong) Cheng Chin Lung		(substituted on) 65'
RW	30	(Hong Kong) Chang Kwong Yin
CF	33	(South Korea) Kim Shin-wook
CF	88	(Hong Kong) Alex Akande
Head Coach:
(Hong Kong) Chu Chi Kwong

Player of the Match:
Cleiton (Kitchee)

Assistant Referees:
Chow Chun Kit
Lam Nai Kei
Fourth Official:
Tam Ping Wun

**Match rules**

- 90 minutes
- 30 minutes of extra time if necessary
- Penalty shoot-out if scores still level
- Maximum of five substitutions, with a sixth allowed in extra time

== Top scorers ==
Rank	Player	Club	Goals
1	(Brazil) Cleiton	Kitchee	4
2	(Hong Kong) Mahama Awal	Southern	3
3	(Japan) Shu Sasaki	Southern	2
3	(Brazil) Stefan Pereira	Southern	2
3	(Brazil) Juninho	Rangers	2
3	(Brazil) Mikael	Kitchee	2
3	(Hong Kong) Poon Pui Hin	Kitchee	2
3	(England) Charlie Scott	Kitchee	2
