= Roberto Júnior =

Hong Kong footballer

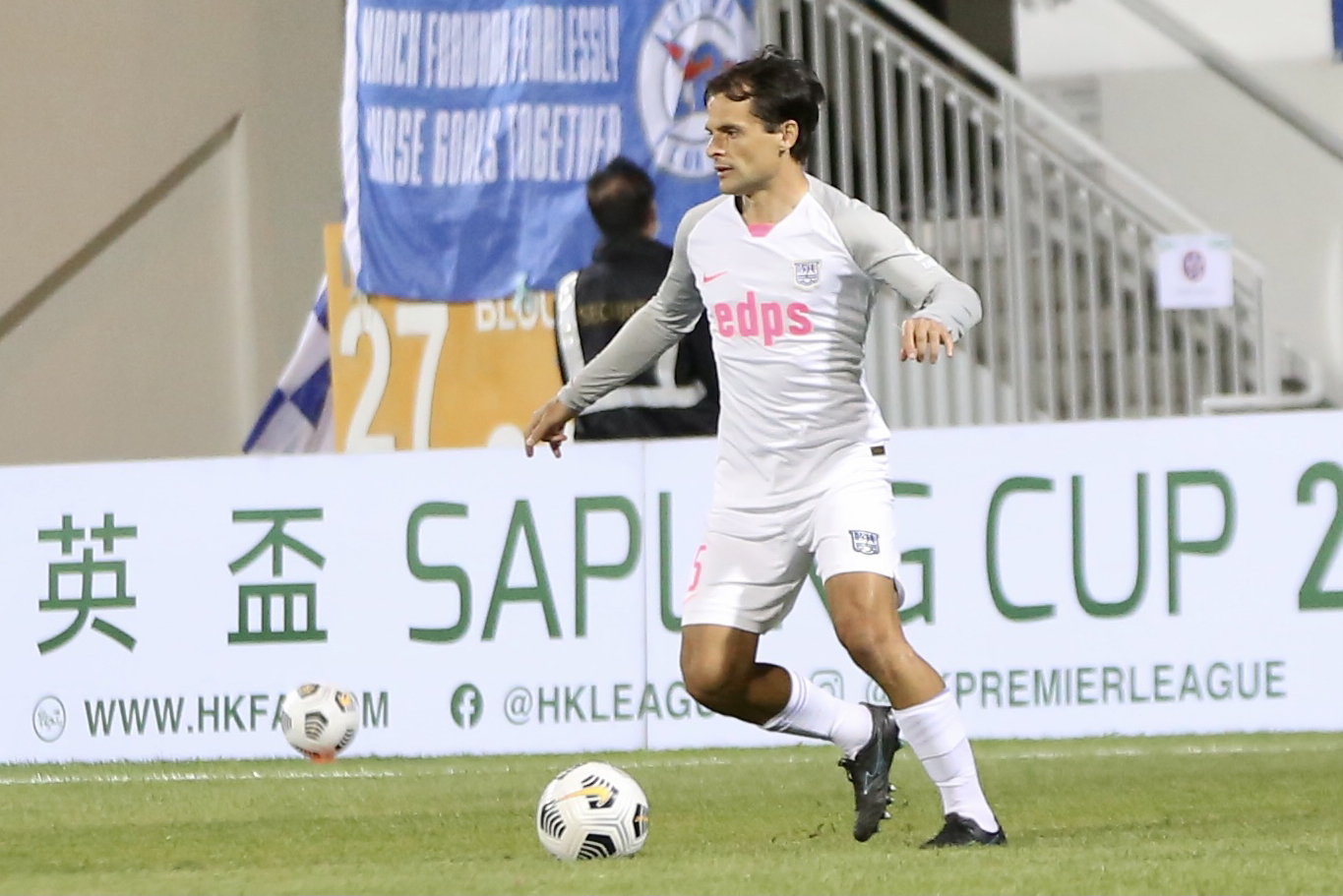

Personal information
- Full name: Roberto Orlando Affonso Júnior
- Date of birth: 28 May 1983 (age 43)
- Place of birth: São Paulo, Brazil
- Height: 1.80 m (5 ft 11 in)
- Positions: Centre back; right back; defensive midfielder

Youth career
- 2001–2005: Santos

Senior career*
Years	Team	Apps	(Gls)
2005	Santos		
2005	→ Paysandu (loan)		
2006	São Carlos		
2007	América (SP)		
2007	Botafogo (SP)		
2007–2014	Sun Hei	116	(9)
2014–2017	Eastern	43	(2)
2017–2020	R&F	43	(2)
2021–2024	Kitchee	41	(4)

International career^{‡}
2016–2021	Hong Kong	24	(1)

Managerial career
- 2023–2024: Kitchee (assistant coach)
- * Club domestic league appearances and goals as of 26 May 2024 ‡ National team caps and goals as of 15 June 2021

Roberto Júnior
- Traditional Chinese: 羅拔圖
- Simplified Chinese: 罗拔图
Transcriptions
Standard Mandarin
- Hanyu Pinyin: Luó Bátú
Yue: Cantonese
- Jyutping: lo4 bat6 tou4

Roberto Orlando Affonso Júnior (Chinese: 羅拔圖; born 28 May 1983), commonly known as Roberto Júnior, is a former professional footballer who played as a defender. Born in Brazil, he played for the Hong Kong national team.

== Club career ==
Roberto started his senior career in Brazil with Santos from the age of 16. In 2007, Roberto joined Sun Hei SC following a dispute with his former club, and spent 7 years with Sun Hei, winning the HKFA League Cup and the Senior Shield in his tenure.

Following Sun Hei's refusal to join the newly established Hong Kong Premier League for the 2014–15 season, Roberto joined Eastern SC and proceeded to win his first league title in the 2015-16 season. Roberto was also a member in Eastern's 2017 AFC Champions League campaign. He was named in the Best XI in the Hong Kong Top Footballer Awards for 2 seasons (2015–16, 2016–17) as an Eastern player.

On 18 June 2017, Eastern's chairman Peter Leung claimed that Roberto was offered a two-year contract by R&F. Two weeks later, the two clubs agreed on a HKD$250,000 transfer fee.

On 14 October 2020, Roberto left R&F after his club's withdrawal from the HKPL in the new season.

On 17 February 2021, Kitchee announced the signing of Roberto and helped Kitchee secure the league title that season. He would proceed to win another Hong Kong Premier League title in the 2022-23 season.

On 10 June 2024, it was confirmed that Roberto had left Kitchee.

== International career ==
Roberto was born and raised in Brazil, but became a naturalized citizen of Hong Kong after 9 years of residence. He got a callup to the Hong Kong national football team and made his international debut in a World Cup qualifier 2–0 loss against Qatar on 24 March 2016.

== Career statistics ==
=== Club ===
As of 22 May 2021

Club	Season	League		Senior Shield		League Cup		FA Cup		AFC Cup		Total	
Club	Season	Apps	Goals	Apps	Goals	Apps	Goals	Apps	Goals	Apps	Goals	Apps	Goals
Sun Hei	2008–09	?	1	-		-		-		-		-	
Sun Hei	2009–10	18	0	-		-		-		-		18	0
Sun Hei	2010–11	15	0	-		-		-		0	0	15	0
Sun Hei	2011–12	17	1	-		1	0	3	0	-		22	1
Sun Hei	2012–13	17	3	2	0	-		1	0	6	0	26	3
Sun Hei	2013–14	15	2	2	0	-		1	0	-		18	2
Eastern	2014–15	12	0	3	1	3	0	2	0	-		20	1
Eastern	2015–16	14	2	2	0	3	2	3	0	-		22	2
Eastern	2016–17	17	0	2	0	-		1	0	5	0	25	0
R&F	2017–18	17	0	1	1	-		1	0	-		19	1
R&F	2018–19	14	1	0	0	-		1	0	-		15	1
R&F	2019–20	12	1	0	0	-		3	0	-		15	1
Kitchee	2020–21	9	1	-		-		-		-		9	1
	Total	177	12	12	2	7	2	16	0	11	0	224	13

=== International ===
As of matches played 15 June 2021

National team	Year	Apps	Goals
Hong Kong	2016	9	0
Hong Kong	2017	6	0
Hong Kong	2018	1	0
Hong Kong	2019	6	1
Hong Kong	2020	0	0
Hong Kong	2021	2	0
Total		24	1

=== International goals ===
Scores and results list Hong Kong's goal tally first.

No.	Date	Venue	Opponent	Score	Result	Competition
1.	19 November 2019	Hong Kong Stadium, So Kon Po, Hong Kong	Cambodia	2–0	2–0	2022 FIFA World Cup qualification

== Honours ==
=== Club ===
Sun Hei

- Hong Kong Senior Shield: 2011–12, 2012–13

Eastern

- Hong Kong Premier League: 2015–16
- Hong Kong Senior Shield: 2014–15, 2015–16

Kitchee

- Hong Kong Premier League: 2020–21, 2022–23
- Hong Kong Senior Challenge Shield: 2022–23, 2023–24
- Hong Kong FA Cup: 2022–23
- HKPLC Cup: 2023–24
