= Charlie Scott (footballer) =

English footballer (born 1997)

Personal information
- Full name: Charlie Thomas Scott
- Date of birth: 2 September 1997 (age 29)
- Place of birth: Stoke-on-Trent, England
- Height: 1.85 m (6 ft 1 in)
- Position: Defensive midfielder

Team information
- Current team: Eastern District
- Number: 67

Youth career
- 2014–2017: Manchester United

Senior career*
| Years | Team | Apps | (Gls) |
| 2017–2018 | Manchester United | 0 | (0) |
| 2018 | → Hamilton Academical (loan) | 2 | (0) |
| 2018 | Altrincham | 0 | (0) |
| 2019 | Newcastle Town | 1 | (0) |
| 2019 | Kidsgrove Athletic | 4 | (0) |
| 2019–2020 | Newcastle Town | | |
| 2020–2021 | Happy Valley | 16 | (3) |
| 2021–2024 | Kitchee | 32 | (6) |
| 2024 | Semen Padang | 7 | (0) |
| 2025–2026 | Boeung Ket | 35 | (3) |
| 2026– | Eastern District | 7 | (1) |
- * Club domestic league appearances and goals as of 8 November 2026

Charlie Thomas Scott (born 2 September 1997) is an English professional footballer who currently plays as a defensive midfielder for Hong Kong Premier League club Eastern District.

== Club career ==
Born in Stoke-on-Trent, Scott joined Manchester United in July 2014. In January 2018, he had a trial at Sheffield United, and later that month moved on loan to Hamilton Academical. He made his senior debut on 28 April 2018. He was released by Manchester United at the end of the 2017–18 season.

After training with Altrincham for some time, he signed for the club on 2 November 2018. He made his debut in a Cheshire Senior Cup match against Congleton Town, playing the full 90 minutes in a 2–0 defeat. However, he left the club at the end of November to seek more regular game time.

In January 2019, he joined Northern Premier League Division One West side Newcastle Town. He made his debut on 5 January in a 4–0 defeat against Radcliffe.

In the summer of 2019, Scott signed for Kidsgrove Athletic. He made four appearances for the club before departing in September 2019. He subsequently returned to Newcastle Town later that month. Scott combined his football career with working as a construction site labourer.

On 21 July 2020, Scott signed for Hong Kong Premier League club Happy Valley.

On 11 August 2021, Scott signed for another HKPL club Kitchee. He departed the club on 31 May 2024 after winning five trophies in three seasons.

On 9 July 2024, Scott signed for Indonesian Liga 1 club Semen Padang for one season.

On 3 January 2025, Scott signed for Cambodian Premier League side Boeung Ket.

On 27 July 2026, Scott returned to Hong Kong and joined Eastern District.

== Career statistics ==
As of 25 October 2024

Appearances and goals by club, season and competition
| Club | Season | League | | | National Cup | | League Cup | | Other | | Total | |
| Club | Season | Division | Apps | Goals | Apps | Goals | Apps | Goals | Apps | Goals | Apps | Goals |
|---|---|---|---|---|---|---|---|---|---|---|---|---|
| Manchester United | 2017–18 | Premier League | 0 | 0 | 0 | 0 | 0 | 0 | 0 | 0 | 0 | 0 |
| Hamilton Academical (loan) | 2017–18 | Scottish Premiership | 2 | 0 | 0 | 0 | 0 | 0 | 0 | 0 | 2 | 0 |
| Altrincham | 2018–19 | National League North | 0 | 0 | 0 | 0 | 0 | 0 | 1 (Note: Appearance in the Cheshire Senior Cup.) | 0 | 1 | 0 |
| Happy Valley | 2020–21 | Hong Kong Premier League | 16 | 3 | 0 | 0 | 6 | 0 | 0 | 0 | 22 | 3 |
| Kitchee | 2021–22 | Hong Kong Premier League | 4 | 0 | 2 | 1 | 6 | 0 | 0 | 0 | 12 | 1 |
| Kitchee | 2022–23 | Hong Kong Premier League | 13 | 3 | 3 | 2 | 7 (Note: Four appearances in the Sapling Cup and three appearances in the Hong Kong Senior Challenge Shield.) | 2 (Note: One goal in the Sapling Cup and one goal in the Hong Kong Senior Challenge Shield.) | 0 | 0 | 23 | 7 |
| Kitchee | 2023–24 | Hong Kong Premier League | 15 | 3 | 2 | 0 | 11 (Note: Eight appearances in the Sapling Cup and three appearances in the Hong Kong Senior Challenge Shield.) | 1 (Note: One goal in the Hong Kong Senior Challenge Shield.) | 4 | 0 | 32 | 4 |
| Kitchee | Total | | 32 | 6 | 7 | 3 | 24 | 3 | 4 | 0 | 67 | 12 |
| Semen Padang | 2024–25 | Liga 1 | 7 | 0 | 0 | 0 | 0 | 0 | 0 | 0 | 7 | 0 |
| Boeung Ket | 2024–25 | CPL | 0 | 0 | 0 | 0 | 0 | 0 | 0 | 0 | 0 | 0 |
| Career total | | | 57 | 9 | 7 | 3 | 30 | 3 | 5 | 0 | 99 | 15 |

== Honours ==
=== Club ===
Kitchee

- Hong Kong Premier League: 2022–23
- Hong Kong Senior Challenge Shield: 2022–23, 2023–24
- Hong Kong FA Cup: 2022–23
- HKPLC Cup: 2023–24

=== Individual ===
- Hong Kong Premier League Team of the Year: 2020–21
- Hong Kong Top Footballer Awards Hong Kong Premier League Player's Player of the Year: 2020–21
