= Cleiton (footballer, born December 1986) =

Brazilian footballer

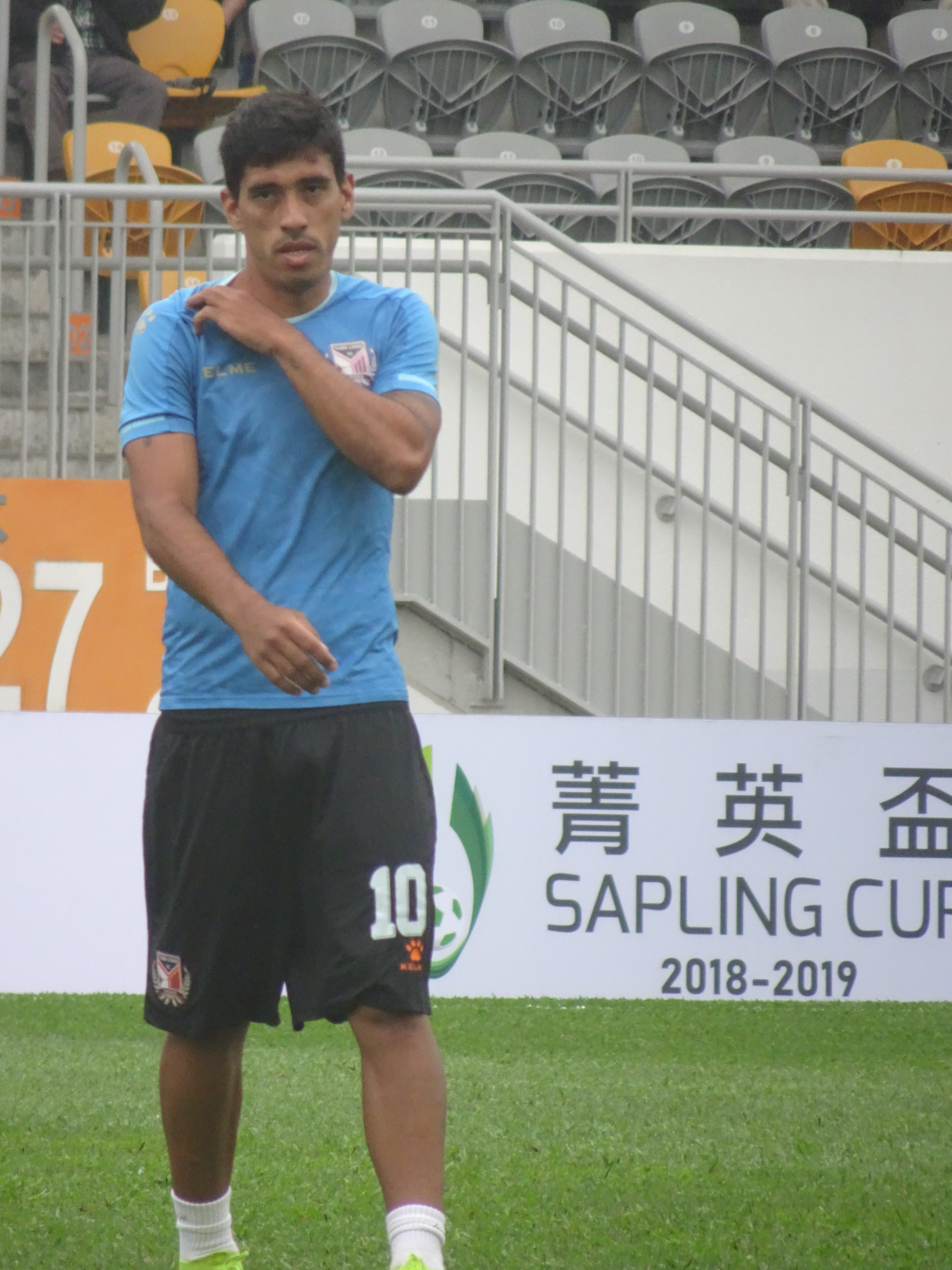

Personal information
- Full name: Cleiton de Oliveira Velasques
- Date of birth: 9 December 1986 (age 39)
- Place of birth: Uruguaiana, Brazil
- Height: 1.79 m (5 ft 10 in)
- Position: Midfielder

Senior career*
Years	Team	Apps	(Gls)
2014–2015	Brasil de Pelotas	35	(0)
2016	Caxias	6	(1)
2016	→ Glória (loan)	12	(0)
2016	Barra		
2017	São Paulo	9	(0)
2017	Esportivo	0	(0)
2017	São Luiz	0	(0)
2018	Aimoré	0	(0)
2018	→ Concórdia (loan)	9	(0)
2018–2019	Yuen Long	17	(2)
2019–2024	Kitchee	62	(11)
- * Club domestic league appearances and goals as of 26 May 2024

Cleiton de Oliveira Velasques (born 9 December 1986), commonly known as Cleiton, is a former Brazilian professional footballer who played as a midfielder.

== Club career ==
On 15 July 2018, it was announced that Cleiton had joined Hong Kong Premier League club Yuen Long.

On 3 July 2019, Cleiton joined another HKPL club Kitchee.

== Honours ==
=== Club ===
Caxias

- Campeonato Gaúcho Série A2: 2016

Kitchee

- Hong Kong Premier League: 2019–20, 2020–21, 2022–23
- Hong Kong Sapling Cup: 2019–20
- Hong Kong Senior Challenge Shield: 2022–23, 2023–24
- Hong Kong FA Cup: 2022–23
- HKPLC Cup: 2023–24
