= Jakob Jantscher =

Austrian footballer (born 1989)

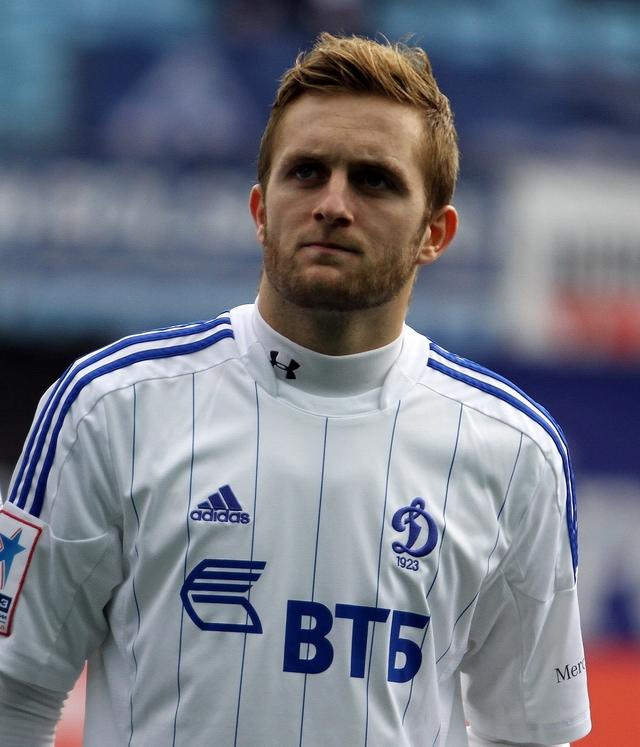
- Jantscher with Dynamo Moscow in 2012

Personal information
- Date of birth: 8 January 1989 (age 37)
- Place of birth: Graz, Austria
- Height: 1.81 m (5 ft 11 in)
- Positions: Winger; striker

Team information
- Current team: Sturm Graz II (assistant coach)

Youth career
- SC Unterpremstätten
- LUV Graz

Senior career*
Years	Team	Apps	(Gls)
2003–2007	Sturm Graz II	26	(6)
2007–2010	Sturm Graz	73	(14)
2010–2013	Red Bull Salzburg	65	(20)
2012–2013	→ Dynamo Moscow (loan)	20	(1)
2013–2014	NEC Nijmegen	26	(3)
2014–2016	Luzern	71	(12)
2016–2017	Çaykur Rizespor	29	(5)
2018–2023	Sturm Graz	121	(31)
2023–2024	Kitchee	12	(2)
2024–2025	ASK Voitsberg	18	(0)
Total		461	(94)

International career
2009–2016	Austria	23	(1)

Managerial career
- 2025–: Sturm Graz II (assistant)
- * Club domestic league appearances and goals

Jakob Jantscher (born 8 January 1989) is an Austrian professional football coach and a former winger or striker. He is an assistant coach for 2. Liga side Sturm Graz II.

== Club career ==
Born in Graz, Jantscher started his career at SC Unterpremstätten und LUV Graz in the Styrian league and 2003 at the age of 14 he moved on to Sturm Graz. On 20 October 2007, he gave his debut in the first team coming on for Thomas Krammer in a match against Red Bull Salzburg. He scored his first goal on 24 November 2007 in a match against SCR Altach.

On 3 June 2010, Jantscher signed with FC Red Bull Salzburg for four years. On 6 September 2012, he joined Dynamo Moscow on one-year loan deal, while Dynamo Moscow secured an option to sign him permanently, which they choose not to.

On 1 September 2013, Jantscher signed for Dutch Eredivisie club NEC Nijmegen, where he stayed only one season as the club was relegated at the end of the season.

On 24 June 2016, Jantscher made a transfer to Turkish side Çaykur Rizespor.

On 9 May 2018, Jantscher played as Sturm Graz beat Red Bull Salzburg in extra time to win the 2017–18 Austrian Cup.

On 30 August 2023, Jantscher joined Hong Kong Premier League club Kitchee.

In June 2024, Jantscher returned to Austria to sign with recently promoted 2. Liga club ASK Voitsberg.

== International career ==
Jantscher played five times for the Austria national football team, under-19 and under-20, and twice for Austria U21. His made his debut for Austria on 6 June 2009 in a 2010 FIFA World Cup qualification against Serbia. His first goal was in a friendly match against Spain, where he scored the only goal for Austria in a 5–1 defeat. He represented the national team at UEFA Euro 2016.

== Coaching career ==
On 23 June 2025, Jantscher returned to Sturm Graz as an assistant coach for their reserve team Sturm Graz II in the 2. Liga.

== Career statistics ==
=== International goals ===
As of 31 May 2010
Scores and results list Austria's goal tally first, score column indicates score after each Jantscher goal.

List of international goals scored by Jakob Jantscher
No.	Date	Venue	Opponent	Score	Result	Competition
1	18 November 2009	Ernst-Happel-Stadion, Vienna, Austria	Spain		1–5	Friendly

== Honours ==
Red Bull Salzburg

- Austrian Football Bundesliga: 2012
- Austrian Cup: 2012

Sturm Graz

- Austrian Cup: 2010, 2018

Kitchee

- Hong Kong Senior Challenge Shield: 2023–24
- HKPLC Cup: 2023–24

Individual

- Austrian Bundesliga Player of the Year: 2021–22
- Austrian Bundesliga Top assist provider: 2021–22
- Austrian Bundesliga Team of the Year: 2021–22
