= 2017–18 Hong Kong Sapling Cup =

Tournament details
- Country: Hong Kong; China
- Dates: 28 October 2017 – 19 May 2018
- Teams: 10

Final positions
- Champions: Kitchee (1st title)
- Runners-up: Tai Po

Tournament statistics
- Matches played: 23
- Goals scored: 68 (2.96 per match)
- Attendance: 14,359 (624 per match)
- All statistics correct as of 19 May 2018.

The 2017–18 Hong Kong Sapling Cup (officially the 2017–18 R&F Properties Sapling Cup for sponsorship reasons) was the 3rd edition of the Sapling Cup. The Cup was contested by the 10 teams in the 2017–18 Hong Kong Premier League. Kitchee were crowned champions after defeating Tai Po in the final.

The objective of the Cup was to create more potential playing opportunities for youth players. In this Cup competition, each team played a minimum of two players born on or after 1 January 1996 (U22) and six foreign players at most during every whole match, with no more than four foreign players on the pitch at the same time.

== Calendar ==
Stage	Draw Date	Date	Matches	Clubs
Group Stage	2 October 2017	28 October 2017 – 18 March 2018	20	10 → 4
Semi-finals	2 October 2017	21–22 April 2018	2	4 → 2
Final	2 October 2017	19 May 2018 at Hong Kong Stadium	1	2 → 1

== Results ==
=== Group stage ===
==== Group A ====
Pos	Team	Pld	W	D	L	GF	GA	GD	Pts	Qualification
1	Tai Po	4	3	1	0	13	5	+8	10	Advance to semi-finals
2	Dreams FC	4	2	1	1	4	4	0	7	Advance to semi-finals
3	Lee Man	4	1	2	1	6	6	0	5	
4	Yuen Long	4	0	2	2	2	6	−4	2	
5	Eastern	4	0	2	2	2	6	−4	2	

Source: Hong Kong Football Association
Rules for classification: 1) Points; 2) Head-to-head points; 3) Head-to-head goal difference; 4) Head-to-head goals scored; 5) Goal difference; 6) Goals scored; 7) Fair-play points; 8) Drawing lots

28 October 2017 M02	Dreams FC	2–1	Lee Man	Tsing Yi, Hong Kong
17:30 UTC+8	Joaquín 29'; Cheng Chin Lung 43'	Report	Pereira 78'	Stadium: Tsing Yi Sports Ground; Attendance: 480

29 October 2017 M03	Tai Po	5–2	Eastern	Diamond Hill, Hong Kong
14:30 UTC+8	Tan Chun Lok 13'; Sartori 17'; Lazari 34', 90+4'; Nakamura 35'	Report	Bleda 27' (pen.); Xu Deshuai 54'	Stadium: Hammer Hill Road Sports Ground; Attendance: 672

26 November 2017 M05	Tai Po	3–0	Yuen Long	Diamond Hill, Hong Kong
14:30 UTC+8	Sartori 5'; Chak Ting Fung 19'; Russell 25'	Report		Stadium: Hammer Hill Road Sports Ground; Attendance: 490

3 December 2017 M08	Eastern	0–1	Dreams FC	Tseung Kwan O, Hong Kong
17:30 UTC+8		Report	Cheng Chin Lung 74'	Stadium: Tseung Kwan O Sports Ground; Attendance: 579

16 December 2017 M09	Lee Man	0–0	Eastern	Diamond Hill, Hong Kong
14:30 UTC+8		Report		Stadium: Hammer Hill Road Sports Ground; Attendance: 589

17 December 2017 M11	Yuen Long	1–1	Dreams FC	Tsing Yi, Hong Kong
14:30 UTC+8	Juninho 66'	Report	Harima 81'	Stadium: Tsing Yi Sports Ground; Attendance: 645

9 February 2018 M13	Dreams FC	0–2	Tai Po	Mong Kok, Hong Kong
20:00 UTC+8		Report	Chiu Siu Wai 17'; Wong Cho Sum 90'	Stadium: Mong Kok Stadium; Attendance: 571

11 February 2018 M15	Yuen Long	1–2	Lee Man	Diamond Hill, Hong Kong
14:30 UTC+8	Randelovic 21'	Report	Pereira 65'; Denis 90'	Stadium: Hammer Hill Road Sports Ground; Attendance: 410

17 March 2018 M18	Eastern	0–0	Yuen Long	Mong Kok, Hong Kong
17:30 UTC+8		Report		Stadium: Mong Kok Stadium; Attendance: 734

18 March 2018 M20	Lee Man	3–3	Tai Po	Tsing Yi, Hong Kong
17:30 UTC+8	Pereira 48', 67' (pen.), 88'	Report	Chan Hiu Fung 7'; Wan 57' (o.g.); Lee Ka Yiu 59'	Stadium: Tsing Yi Sports Ground; Attendance: 324

==== Group B ====
Pos	Team	Pld	W	D	L	GF	GA	GD	Pts	Qualification
1	Kitchee	4	3	1	0	9	3	+6	10	Advance to semi-finals
2	Pegasus	4	3	0	1	6	5	+1	9	Advance to semi-finals
3	Southern	4	1	1	2	6	6	0	4	
4	(China) R&F	4	1	0	3	5	8	−3	3	
5	Rangers	4	1	0	3	5	9	−4	3	

Source: Hong Kong Football Association
Rules for classification: 1) Points; 2) Head-to-head points; 3) Head-to-head goal difference; 4) Head-to-head goals scored; 5) Goal difference; 6) Goals scored; 7) Fair-play points; 8) Drawing lots

28 October 2017 M01	Southern	1–2	Rangers	Diamond Hill, Hong Kong
14:30 UTC+8	Marcos 90+6' (pen.)	Report	Miović 27'; Cheng Siu Kwan 61'	Stadium: Hammer Hill Road Sports Ground; Attendance: 396

29 October 2017 M04	Pegasus	0–4	Kitchee	Mong Kok, Hong Kong
17:30 UTC+8		Report	Sandro 50'; Alex 53', 56'; Stamp 78'	Stadium: Mong Kok Stadium; Attendance: 1,173

2 December 2017 M06	R&F (China)	1–2	Pegasus	Tseung Kwan O, Hong Kong
17:30 UTC+8	Giovane 36'	Report	Major 56'; Wu Chun Ming 70'	Stadium: Tseung Kwan O Sports Ground; Attendance: 301

3 December 2017 M07	Southern	1–1	Kitchee	Diamond Hill, Hong Kong
14:30 UTC+8	Marcos 16'	Report	Fernando 73'	Stadium: Hammer Hill Road Sports Ground; Attendance: 752

16 December 2017 M10	Kitchee	1–0	(China) R&F	Tseung Kwan O, Hong Kong
17:30 UTC+8	Vadócz 30'	Report		Stadium: Tseung Kwan O Sports Ground; Attendance: 423

17 December 2017 M12	Rangers	0–3	Pegasus	Tsing Yi, Hong Kong
17:00 UTC+8		Report	Major 33', 87'; Emir 84'	Stadium: Tsing Yi Sports Ground; Attendance: 645

10 February 2018 M14	Rangers	1–2	(China) R&F	Tseung Kwan O, Hong Kong
17:00 UTC+8	Lau Chi Lok 69'	Report	Wong Kai Yiu 33'; Leonço 54'	Stadium: Tseung Kwan O Sports Ground; Attendance: 125

11 February 2018 M16	Pegasus	1–0	Southern	Tsing Yi, Hong Kong
17:30 UTC+8	Awal 77'	Report		Stadium: Tsing Yi Sports Ground; Attendance: 437

17 March 2018 M17	R&F (China)	2–4	Southern	Yuen Long, Hong Kong
14:30 UTC+8	Leonço 13', 90+2'	Report	Wellingsson 39', 75'; Martínez 58'; Ngue 84'	Stadium: Yuen Long Stadium; Attendance: 236

18 March 2018 M19	Kitchee	3–2	Rangers	Diamond Hill, Hong Kong
14:30 UTC+8	Lum 2', 15'; Vadócz 41'	Report	Lau Chi Lok 29'; Sasaki 60' (pen.)	Stadium: Hammer Hill Road Sports Ground; Attendance: 324

=== Semi-finals ===
21 April 2018 (Note: The two semi-final matches were originally scheduled on April 21 and April 22, 2018 at 3pm. To avoid clash with the postponed match "Rangers vs R&F" of 2017–18 Hong Kong Premier League, held on April 22, 2018 at 2:30pm, and to maintain fairness of the Sapling Cup, the two matches were rescheduled to 5:30pm.) M21	Tai Po	2–1	Pegasus	Mong Kok, Hong Kong
17:30 UTC+8	Sartori 50' (pen.); Lazari 90+4'	Report	Lam 24'	Stadium: Mong Kok Stadium; Attendance: 1,107; Referee: Tong Kui Sum

22 April 2018 M22	Kitchee	3–1	Dreams FC	Mong Kok, Hong Kong
17:30 UTC+8	Vadócz 15'; Alex 70', 84'	Report	Lam Hin Ting 50'	Stadium: Mong Kok Stadium; Attendance: 1,341; Referee: Ho Wai Sing

=== Final ===
19 May 2018 M23	Tai Po	1–2	Kitchee	So Kon Po, Hong Kong
15:00 UTC+8	Leung Kwun Chung 90+3'	Report	Fernando 85', 89'	Stadium: Hong Kong Stadium; Attendance: 2,165; Referee: Ng Chiu Kok
