= 2022–23 Hong Kong Senior Shield =

Tournament details
- Country: Hong Kong
- Dates: 11 September 2022 – 22 January 2023
- Teams: 10

Final positions
- Champions: Kitchee (8th title)
- Runners-up: Eastern

Tournament statistics
- Matches played: 9
- Goals scored: 31 (3.44 per match)
- Attendance: 17,124 (1,903 per match)
- Top goal scorer(s): Dejan Damjanović (4 goals)

Awards
- Best player: Yapp Hung Fai

2022–23 Hong Kong Senior Shield was the 119th season of the Hong Kong Senior Shield. 10 teams entered this edition, with 2 games being played in the first round before the quarter-finals stage. The competition was only open to teams that played in the 2022–23 Hong Kong Premier League.

The champions received HK$150,000 in prize money while the runners up received HK$50,000. The best player of the final received a HK$10,000 bonus. In addition, the two losing teams in semi-finals received HK$20,000 while the remaining teams received HK$5,000.

Eastern were the defending champions but lost to Kitchee in the final. Kitchee became the champions for the 8th time after beating Eastern in the final.

== Calendar ==
Stage	Round	Draw Date	Date	Matches	Clubs
Knockout	First round	20 August 2022	11–12 September 2022	2	10 → 8
Knockout	Quarter-finals	20 August 2022	22–23 October 2022	4	8 → 4
Knockout	Semi-finals	20 August 2022	25–26 December 2022	2	4 → 2
Knockout	Final	20 August 2022	22 January 2023	1	2 → 1

== Bracket ==
First round
Tai Po	1
**Rangers**	**2**
HKFC	0
**Kitchee**	**5**

Quarter-finals
HK U23	0
**Rangers**	**2**
Resources Capital	1
**Eastern**	**3**
Southern	1
**Kitchee (a.e.t.)**	**4***
**Lee Man**	**5**
Sham Shui Po	0

Semi-finals
Rangers	0
**Eastern**	1
**Kitchee**	4
Lee Man	0

Final
Eastern	1 (2)
**Kitchee (p)**	**1 (4)**

Bold = winner
* = after extra time, ( ) = penalty shootout score

== Fixtures and results ==
=== First round ===
11 September 2022	Tai Po	**1–2**	**Rangers**	Mong Kok Stadium
15:00 UTC+8	Cividini 90'	Report	Fernando 67'; Juninho 84'	Attendance: 1,202; Referee: Yu Kin Fung

12 September 2022	HKFC	**0–5**	**Kitchee**	Mong Kok Stadium
15:00 UTC+8		Report	Scott 51'; Mikael 52'; Mingazov 79', 81'; Roberto 87'	Attendance: 1,505; Referee: Tam Ping Wun

=== Quarter-finals ===
22 October 2022	Southern	**1–4** (a.e.t.)	**Kitchee**	Mong Kok Stadium
15:00 UTC+8	Awal 78'	Report	Damjanović 90+6', 96', 120+1'; Mingazow 105'	Attendance: 1,542; Referee: Luk Kin Sun

22 October 2022	**Lee Man**	**5–0**	Sham Shui Po	Tseung Kwan O Sports Ground
18:00 UTC+8	Cheng Siu Kwan 23'; Gavilán 45+2', 52'; Everton 57', 81'	Report		Attendance: 355; Referee: Lau Fong Hei

23 October 2022	Resources Capital	**1–3**	**Eastern**	Tai Po Sports Ground
15:00 UTC+8	Sá 57'	Report	Bertomeu 2'; Estevez 17'; Sun Ming Him 53'	Attendance: 420; Referee: Tam Ping Wun

23 October 2022	HK U23	**0–2**	**Rangers**	Tseung Kwan O Sports Ground
18:00 UTC+8		Report	Kilama 7'; Juninho 63'	Attendance: 263; Referee: Liu Kwok Man

=== Semi-finals ===
25 December 2022	**Kitchee**	**4–0**	Lee Man	Mong Kok Stadium
15:00 UTC+8	Cleiton 17', 24'; Mikael 80'; Damjanović 90+4'	Report		Attendance: 2,982; Referee: Luk Kin Sun

26 December 2022	Rangers	**0–1**	**Eastern**	Mong Kok Stadium
15:00 UTC+8		Report	Bertomeu 47'	Attendance: 1,663; Referee: Yu Kin Fung

=== Final ===
22 January 2023	Eastern	**1–1** (a.e.t.) (**2–4** p)	**Kitchee**	Hong Kong Stadium
16:00 UTC+8	Bertomeu 78'	Report	Mikael 71'	Attendance: 7,192; Referee: Lau Fong Hei
	**Penalties**
	Gondra (penalty scored); Sun Ming Him (penalty missed); Wong Tsz Ho (penalty missed); Leung Kwun Chung (penalty scored)		(penalty scored) Sartori; (penalty scored) Damjanović; (penalty scored) Scott; (penalty scored) Gerbig

== Final ==
22 January 2023
16:00 UTC+8

Eastern	1–1 (a.e.t.)	Kitchee
Bertomeu 78'	Report	Mikael 71'
Penalties
Gondra (penalty scored); Sun Ming Him (penalty missed); Wong Tsz Ho (penalty missed); Leung Kwun Chung (penalty scored)	2–4	(penalty scored) Sartori; (penalty scored) Damjanović; (penalty scored) Scott; (penalty scored) Gerbig

Hong Kong Stadium
Attendance: 7,192
Referee: Lau Fong Hei

**Eastern**	**Kitchee**

GK	1	(Hong Kong) Yapp Hung Fai
RB	2	(Hong Kong) Alexander Jojo
CB	3	(Kyrgyzstan) Tamirlan Kozubayev	(yellow card) 114'
CB	4	(Hong Kong) Leon Jones	(yellow card) 28'
DM	6	(Hong Kong) Wu Chun Ming		(substituted off) 98'
CF	9	(Spain) Víctor Bertomeu	(yellow card) 67'	(substituted off) 90'
RW	11	(Hong Kong) Wong Ho Chun		(substituted off) 61'
DM	16	(Hong Kong) Leung Chun Pong (c)		(substituted off) 84'
LB	22	(Hong Kong) Leung Kwun Chung	(yellow card) 90+3'
CF	23	(Hong Kong) Sun Ming Him
CM	27	(Spain) Marcos Gondra	(yellow card) 81'
Substitutes:
GK	26	(Hong Kong) Liu Fu Yuen
RB	5	(Portugal) João Gil		(substituted on) 84'
MF	8	(Philippines) Mark Swainston
AM	10	(Chinese Taipei) Emilio Estevez		(substituted on) 98'
CF	13	(Hong Kong) Chu Wai Kwan		(substituted on) 90'
MF	24	(Hong Kong) Wong Wai Chun
LB	30	(Hong Kong) Wong Tsz Ho	(yellow card) 65'	(substituted on) 61'
MF	42	(Hong Kong) Yeung Tung Ki
MF	44	(Hong Kong) Prabhat Gurung
AM	55	(Hong Kong) Ma Hei Wai
MF	66	(Hong Kong) Lee Cheuk Hin
FW	77	(Hong Kong) Lee Chun Ting
Head coach:
(Hong Kong) Roberto Losada

GK	86	(Hong Kong) Paulo César
CB	5	(Hong Kong) Hélio (c)
LW	7	(Turkmenistan) Ruslan Mingazow	(yellow card) 120'
CF	9	(Montenegro) Dejan Damjanović
CM	10	(Brazil) Cleiton		(substituted off) 101'
RB	15	(Hong Kong) Roberto	(yellow card) 52'
CM	17	(Brazil) Mikael
CB	18	(Hong Kong) Oliver Gerbig
DM	24	(Hong Kong) Ngan Cheuk Pan		(substituted off) 111'
LB	77	(Hong Kong) Fernando
RW	99	(Hong Kong) Poon Pui Hin		(substituted off) 57'
Substitutes:
GK	1	(Hong Kong) Wang Zhenpeng
RB	2	(Hong Kong) Law Tsz Chun
DM	4	(England) Charlie Scott		(substituted on) 101'
LW	8	(Brazil) Igor Sartori		(substituted on) 57'
CB	12	(Hong Kong) Tomas Maronesi
DM	19	(Hong Kong) Huang Yang
AM	20	(Hong Kong) Sohgo Ichikawa
RB	22	(France) Clement Benhaddouche
LB	23	(Hong Kong) Jordon Brown
AM	28	(Hong Kong) Cheng Chin Lung
CB	66	(Hong Kong) Tsang Yi Hang
CF	88	(Hong Kong) Alex Akande		(substituted on) 111'
Head Coach:
(Hong Kong) Chu Chi Kwong

Player of the Match:
Yapp Hung Fai (Eastern)

Assistant Referees:
Law Ming Leong
Amarjit Singh Sarao
Fourth Official:
Tam Ping Wun

**Match rules**

- 90 minutes
- 30 minutes of extra time if necessary
- Penalty shoot-out if scores still level
- Maximum of five substitutions, with a sixth allowed in extra time

== Top scorers ==
Rank	Player	Club	Goals
1	(Montenegro) Dejan Damjanović	Kitchee	4
2	(Turkmenistan) Ruslan Mingazow	Kitchee	3
2	(Brazil) Mikael	Kitchee	3
2	(Spain) Víctor Bertomeu	Eastern	3
3	(Brazil) Juninho	Rangers	2
3	(Spain) Manuel Gavilán	Lee Man	2
3	(Brazil) Everton Camargo	Lee Man	2
3	(Brazil) Cleiton	Kitchee	2
