= 2023–24 Hong Kong Senior Shield =

Tournament details
- Country: Hong Kong
- Dates: 30 September 2023 – 11 February 2024
- Teams: 11

Final positions
- Champions: Kitchee (9th title)
- Runners-up: Eastern

Tournament statistics
- Matches played: 10
- Goals scored: 38 (3.8 per match)
- Attendance: 11,665 (1,167 per match)
- Top goal scorer(s): 6 players (2 goals each)

Awards
- Best player: Yu Joy Yin

2023–24 Hong Kong Senior Shield was the 120th season of the Hong Kong Senior Shield. 11 teams entered this edition, with 3 games being played in the first round before the quarter-finals stage. The competition was only open to teams that played in the 2023–24 Hong Kong Premier League.

The champions received HK$150,000 in prize money while the runners up received HK$50,000. The best player of the final received a HK$10,000 bonus. In addition, the two losing teams in semi-finals received HK$20,000 while the remaining teams received HK$5,000.

Kitchee were the defending champions. They defeated Eastern in the final and became the champions for the 9th time.

== Calendar ==
Stage	Round	Draw Date	Date	Matches	Clubs
Knockout	First round		30 September – 1 October 2023	3	11 → 8
Knockout	Quarter-finals		1, 3–5 November 2023	4	8 → 4
Knockout	Semi-finals		11–12 November 2023	2	4 → 2
Knockout	Final		11 February 2024	1	2 → 1

== Bracket ==
First round
1 October 2023
**Tai Po (p)**	**1 (4)**
North District	1 (3)
30 September 2023
**Southern**	**5**
HK U23	1
1 October 2023
**Sham Shui Po**	**1**
HKFC	0

Quarter-finals
4 November 2023
**Kitchee**	**7**
Resources Capital	0
3 November 2023
**Lee Man**	**2**
Tai Po	1
5 November 2023
**Eastern (a.e.t.)**	**3***
Southern	2
1 November 2023
**Rangers (a.e.t.)**	**4***
Sham Shui Po	3

Semi-finals
12 November 2023
**Kitchee**	**1**
Lee Man	0
11 November 2023
**Eastern**	**3**
Rangers	0

Final
11 February 2024
**Kitchee** (a.e.t.)	**2***
Eastern	1

Bold = winner
* = after extra time, ( ) = penalty shootout score

== Fixtures and results ==
=== First round ===
30 September 2023 SS01	**Southern**	**5–1**	HK U23	Aberdeen Sports Ground
15:00	Sasaki 61'; Ju Yingzhi 65'; Pereira 71'; Awal 90', 90+4'	Report	Lee Lok Him 18'	Attendance: 231; Referee: Poon Chun Kit

1 October 2023 SS02	**Tai Po**	**1–1** (**4–3** p)	North District	Tai Po Sports Ground
15:00	Chan Hiu Fung 44'	Report	Kendy 11' (pen.)	Attendance: 765; Referee: Tam Ping Wun
	**Penalties**
	Marcão (penalty scored); Renner (penalty missed); Chung Wai Keung (penalty scored); Luizinho (penalty scored); Cividini (penalty scored)		(penalty scored) Neném; (penalty scored) Pedrão; (penalty missed) Law Hiu Chung; (penalty scored) Matheus; (penalty missed) Wong Wai Kwok

1 October 2023 SS03	**Sham Shui Po**	**1–0**	HKFC	Sham Shui Po Sports Ground
15:00	Wongpila 39'			Attendance: 176; Referee: Ho Wai Sing

=== Quarter-finals ===
1 November 2023 SS04	**Rangers**	**4–3** (a.e.t.)	Sham Shui Po	Mong Kok Stadium
20:00	Ma Sang-hoon 23', 30'; Lau Chi Lok 33'; Yiu Ho Ming 104'	Report	N. Benavides 45+1'; Lam Ka Wai 53' (o.g.); Marković 63'	Attendance: 362; Referee: Woo Chun Sing

3 November 2023 SS05	**Lee Man**	**2–1**	Tai Po	Mong Kok Stadium
20:00	Everton 65'; Wong Wai 80'	Report	Luizinho 24'	Attendance: 1,129; Referee: Tam Ping Wun

4 November 2023 SS06	**Kitchee**	**7–0**	Resources Capital	Tai Po Sports Ground
15:00	Mingazov 1'; Jantscher 5'; Poon Pui Hin 8'; Hui Chak Wai 23' (o.g.); Russell 44'; Kim Shin-wook 55', 87'	Report		Attendance: 387; Referee: Poon Chun Kit

5 November 2023 SS07	**Eastern**	**3–2** (a.e.t.)	Southern	Tai Po Sports Ground
15:00	Almazan 9'; Gondra 38'; Baffoe 94'	Report	Pereira 32'; Odu 73'	Attendance: 529; Referee: Wong Wai Lun

=== Semi-finals ===
11 November 2023 SS08	**Eastern**	**3–0**	Rangers	Mong Kok Stadium
18:00	Baffoe 18'; Wong Ho Chun 22'; Kozubayev 89'	Report		Attendance: 1,156; Referee: Lau Fong Hei

12 November 2023 SS09	**Kitchee**	**1–0**	Lee Man	Mong Kok Stadium
15:00	Juninho 18'	Report		Attendance: 2,360; Referee: Liu Kwok Man

=== Final ===
11 February 2024 SS10	**Kitchee**	**2–1** (a.e.t.)	Eastern	Mong Kok Stadium
15:00	Scott 90+6' (pen.); Mingazow 118'	Report	Leung Kwun Chung 85' (pen.)	Attendance: 4,570; Referee: Tam Ping Wun

== Final ==
11 February 2024
15:00

Kitchee	2–1 (a.e.t.)	Eastern
Scott 90+6' (pen.); Mingazow 118'	Report	Leung Kwun Chung 85' (pen.)

Mong Kok Stadium
Attendance: 4,570
Referee: Tam Ping Wun

**Kitchee**	**Eastern**

GK	86	(Hong Kong) Paulo César
DM	4	(England) Charlie Scott		(substituted off) 105'
CB	5	(Hong Kong) Hélio (c)	(yellow card) 54' (yellow-red card) 76'
LW	7	(Turkmenistan) Ruslan Mingazow	(yellow card) 118'
RW	8	(Brazil) Igor Sartori	(yellow card) 34'	(substituted off) 74'
CM	10	(Brazil) Cleiton		(substituted off) 101'
RB	15	(Hong Kong) Roberto	(yellow card) 79'
CM	17	(Brazil) Mikael	(yellow card) 76'	(substituted off) 89'
CB	18	(Hong Kong) Oliver Gerbig	(yellow card) 116'
LB	77	(Hong Kong) Fernando		(substituted off) 19'
CF	89	(Austria) Jakob Jantscher		(substituted off) 89'
Substitutes:
GK	1	(Hong Kong) Wang Zhenpeng
LB	2	(Hong Kong) Law Tsz Chun		(substituted on) 19'
CM	16	(Hong Kong) Tan Chun Lok		(substituted on) 89'
DM	19	(Hong Kong) Huang Yang
CB	26	(Hong Kong) Andy Russell		(substituted on) 105'
AM	28	(Hong Kong) Cheng Chin Lung
AM	32	(Hong Kong) Yuen Chun Him
CB	74	(Hong Kong) Kam Chi Kin
CF	90	(Hong Kong) Juninho	(yellow card) 80'	(substituted on) 74'
CF	96	(Hong Kong) Matthew Slattery
CF	99	(Hong Kong) Poon Pui Hin		(substituted on) 89'
Head coach:
(South Korea) Kim Dong-jin

GK	1	(Hong Kong) Yapp Hung Fai
RB	2	(Scotland) Calum Hall		(substituted off) 111'
CB	3	(Kyrgyzstan) Tamirlan Kozubayev	(yellow card) 35' (yellow-red card) 90+3'
CB	5	(Hong Kong) Leon Jones	(yellow card) 77'
CF	7	(Spain) Noah Baffoe	(yellow card) 45+3' (red card) 108'
RW	10	(Hong Kong) Sun Ming Him		(substituted off) 111'
CM	14	(Hong Kong) Yu Joy Yin		(substituted off) 99'
DM	21	(Spain) Daniel Almazan	(yellow card) 45+1'
LB	22	(Hong Kong) Leung Kwun Chung (c)
LW	23	(Hong Kong) Ma Hei Wai		(substituted off) 86'
DM	27	(Spain) Marcos Gondra	(yellow card) 33'	(substituted off) 101'
Substitutes:
GK	26	(Hong Kong) Liu Fu Yuen
RB	6	(Hong Kong) Enson Kwok
AM	8	(Israel) Barak Braunshtain
RW	11	(Hong Kong) Wong Ho Chun	(yellow card) 105'	(substituted on) 86'
CB	15	(Hong Kong) Wong Ho Yin		(substituted on) 101'
DM	16	(Hong Kong) Leung Chun Pong		(substituted on) 99'
RB	17	(South Korea) Ryu Ji-seong		(substituted on) 111'
LW	19	(Hong Kong) Bosley Yu
LW	31	(Hong Kong) Ng Yu Hei		(substituted on) 111'
CM	42	(Hong Kong) Yeung Tung Ki
AM	44	(Hong Kong) Prabhat Gurung
RW	77	(Hong Kong) Lee Chun Ting
Head Coach:
(Hong Kong) Roberto Losada

Player of the Match:
Yu Joy Yin (Eastern)

Assistant Referees:
So Kai Man
Fok Pong Shing
Fourth Official:
Wong Wai Lun

**Match rules**

- 90 minutes
- 30 minutes of extra time if necessary
- Penalty shoot-out if scores still level
- Maximum of five substitutions, with a sixth allowed in extra time

== Top scorers ==
Rank	Player	Club	Goals
1	(Hong Kong) Mahama Awal	Southern	2
1	(Spain) Noah Baffoe	Eastern	2
1	(South Korea) Kim Shin-wook	Kitchee	2
1	(South Korea) Ma Sang-hoon	Rangers	2
1	(Turkmenistan) Ruslan Mingazow	Kitchee	2
1	(Hong Kong) Stefan Pereira	Southern	2
7	24 players		1
