= Igor Sartori =

Brazilian footballer (born 1993)

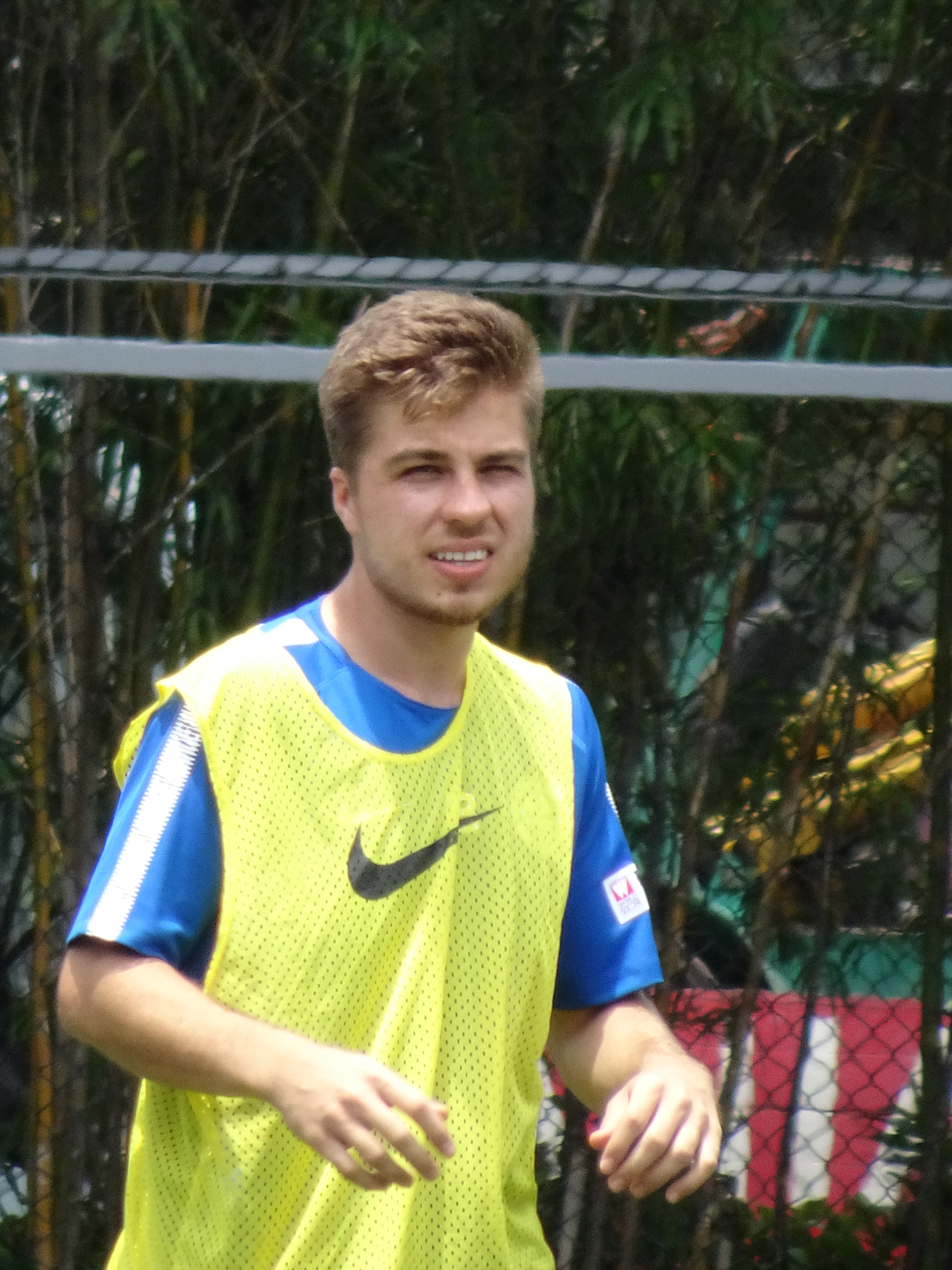

Personal information
- Full name: Igor Torres Sartori
- Date of birth: 8 January 1993 (age 33)
- Place of birth: Rio de Janeiro, Brazil
- Height: 1.76 m (5 ft 9 1/2 in)
- Position: Left winger

Team information
- Current team: Tai Po
- Number: 18

Youth career
- 2005–2011: CFZ Rio
- 2012–2013: Flamengo

Senior career*
Years	Team	Apps	(Gls)
2011	Kashima Antlers	2	(0)
2012–2017	Flamengo	11	(0)
2015	→ Bragantino (loan)	13	(0)
2015–2017	→ Red Bull Brasil (loan)	27	(3)
2017–2019	Tai Po	35	(17)
2019–2020	R&F	14	(9)
2021–2022	Meizhou Hakka	33	(6)
2022	Ventforet Kofu	5	(1)
2023–2024	Kitchee	26	(6)
2024–	Tai Po	38	(11)
- * Club domestic league appearances and goals as of 25 May 2025

Igor Torres Sartori (born 8 January 1993) is a Brazilian professional footballer who currently plays as a left winger for Hong Kong Premier League club Tai Po.

Sartori is the son of former Flamengo striker Alcindo Sartori.

== Club career ==
Sartori made his professional debut in the 1–0 loss to Ventforet Kofu on 15 June 2011.

On 2 August 2017, Sartori was announced as a player of Hong Kong Premier League club Tai Po. On 13 May 2018, Tai Po manager, Lee Chi Kin, confirmed that Sartori would remain with the club next season.

On 10 June 2019, R&F announced the signing of Sartori on a monthly salary of HK$300,000 per month. On 14 October 2020, Sartori left the club after his club's withdrawal from the HKPL in the new season.

On 12 January 2021, Sartori signed with China League One club Meizhou Hakka. He would go on to be utilized as a vital member of the team that gained promotion to the top tier after coming second within the division at the end of the 2021 China League One campaign.

In August 2022, Sartori signed for J2 League club Ventforet Kofu. On 16 October 2022, he won his club a Emperor's Cup for the first time in history. He left the club in 2022 after a season.

On 6 January 2023, Sartori returned to Hong Kong and joined Kitchee.

On 18 July 2024, Sartori returned to Tai Po after 5 years.

== Career statistics ==
=== Club ===
(Correct as of 10 November 2014)

Club	Season	Brazilian Série A		Copa do Brasil		Copa Libertadores		Copa Sudamericana		State League		Total	
Club	Season	Apps	Goals	Apps	Goals	Apps	Goals	Apps	Goals	Apps	Goals	Apps	Goals
Flamengo	2013	0	0	0	0	-	-	-	-	3	0	3	0
Flamengo	2014	4	0	0	0	-	-	-	-	3	0	7	0
Total		4	0	0	0	0	0	0	0	6	0	10	0

according to combined sources on the Flamengo official website and Flaestatística.

Hong Kong

(Correct as of 13 May 2023)

Club	Season	Division	League		Senior Shield		Sapling Cup		FA Cup		Continental Competition		Total	
Club	Season	Division	Apps	Goals	Apps	Goals	Apps	Goals	Apps	Goals	Apps	Goals	Apps	Goals
Tai Po	2017–18	Hong Kong Premier League	17	9	1	1	6	3	3	4	-		27	17
Tai Po	2018–19	Hong Kong Premier League	18	8	4	1	1	0	1	0	5	3	29	12
R&F	2019–20	Hong Kong Premier League	14	9	2	0	5	2	3	2	-		24	13
Kitchee	2022–23	Hong Kong Premier League	12	3	1	0	2	0	2	0	-		17	3
	Total		61	29	8	2	14	5	9	6	5	3	97	45

China

(Correct as of 22 December 2021)

Club	Season	Division	League		Cup		Total	
Club	Season	Division	Apps	Goals	Apps	Goals	Apps	Goals
Meizhou Hakka	2021	China League One	33	6	0	0	33	6
	Total		33	6	0	0	33	6

Japan

(Correct as of 19 October 2022)

Club	Season	Division	League		Cup		Total	
Club	Season	Division	Apps	Goals	Apps	Goals	Apps	Goals
Ventforet Kofu	2022	J2 League	5	1	0	0	0	0
	Total		5	1	0	0	0	0

== Honours ==
=== Club ===
Flamengo

- Campeonato Carioca: 2014

Tai Po

- Hong Kong Premier League: 2018–19, 2024–25
- Hong Kong FA Cup: 2025–26
- Hong Kong Senior Shield: 2025–26

Ventforet Kofu

- Emperor's Cup: 2022

Kitchee

- Hong Kong Premier League: 2022–23
- Hong Kong Senior Challenge Shield: 2022–23, 2023–24
- Hong Kong FA Cup: 2022–23
- HKPLC Cup: 2023–24

=== Individual ===
- Hong Kong Footballer of the Year: 2019
