= 2023–24 HKPLC Cup =

Tournament details
- Country: Hong Kong
- Dates: 28 December 2023 – 1 January 2024
- Teams: 4

Final positions
- Champions: Kitchee
- Runners-up: Lee Man

Tournament statistics
- Matches played: 4
- Goals scored: 17 (4.25 per match)
- Attendance: 5,415 (1,354 per match)
- Top goal scorer(s): Gil (3 goals)

The 2023–24 Hong Kong Premier League Committee Cup was the inaugural Hong Kong Premier League Committee Cup, top four teams from last edition of Hong Kong Premier League entered this competition. The competition started on 28 December 2023, and the third-place match and finals were staged on 1 January 2024. All matches were staged at Mong Kok Stadium.

The champions of the HKPLC Cup received HKD$80,000 in prize money, while the runner-up received HKD$40,000. In addition, the third-place team received HK$20,000 while the fourth-place team received HK$10,000.

== Qualifications ==
Top four teams from last edition of Hong Kong Premier League entered the stage.

Team	Access
Kitchee	2022–23 Hong Kong Premier League champion
Lee Man	2022–23 Hong Kong Premier League runner-up
Rangers	2022–23 Hong Kong Premier League third-place
Eastern	2022–23 Hong Kong Premier League fourth-place

== Format ==
Top four teams from last edition of Hong Kong Premier League entered this edition. All teams compete in a compete in a single-elimination format. If the scores are level after 90 minutes, the teams play a penalty shootout.

The number of foreign players teams can register is unlimited. Each team can register no more than 6 foreign or local guest players for the tournament.

=== Guest players ===
Team	Player 1	Player 2	Player 3	Player 4
Kitchee	(Hong Kong) Chen Ngo Hin	(Hong Kong) Ngan Cheuk Pan		
Lee Man	(Hong Kong) Yung Hui To			
Rangers	(China) Yang Bailin	(Hong Kong) Au Yeung Yiu Chung	(Japan) Makoto Rindo	(Nigeria) John Umeofia
Eastern	(Hong Kong) Bosley Yu	(Israel) Barak Braunshtain		

== Bracket ==
Semi-finals
28 December 2023 – Mong Kok
**Lee Man**	**3**
Rangers	2
29 December 2023 – Mong Kok
**Kitchee**	**5**
Eastern	0

Final
1 January 2024 – Mong Kok
Lee Man	2 (4)
**Kitchee (p)**	**2 (5)**
Third-place match
1 January 2024 – Mong Kok
**Rangers**	**3**
Eastern	0

Bold = winner
* = after extra time, ( ) = penalty shootout score

== Fixtures and results ==
=== Semi-finals ===
28 December 2023	**Lee Man**	**3–2**	Rangers	Mong Kok
20:00 UTC+8	Anier 5'; Gil 33', 49'	Report	Lau Chi Lok 73'; Umeofia 90+4'	Stadium: Mong Kok Stadium; Attendance: 1,256; Referee: Lau Fong Hei

29 December 2023	**Kitchee**	**5–0**	Eastern	Mong Kok
20:00 UTC+8	Russell 3'; Scott 15'; Mingazow 28'; Temirov 78', 84'	Report		Stadium: Mong Kok Stadium; Attendance: 1,181; Referee: Poon Chun Kit

=== Third-place match ===
1 January 2024	**Rangers**	**3–0**	Eastern	Mong Kok
15:00 UTC+8	Au Yeung Yiu Chung 18' (pen.); Umeofia 29'; Leung Hoi Chun 87'	Report		Stadium: Mong Kok Stadium; Referee: Wong Wai Lun

=== Final ===
1 January 2024	Lee Man	**2–2** (**4–5** p)	**Kitchee**	Mong Kok
17:30 UTC+8	Anier 2'; Gil 7'	Report	Mikael 9'; Mingazow 14'	Stadium: Mong Kok Stadium; Attendance: 2,978; Referee: Liu Kwok Man
	**Penalties**
	Anier (penalty missed); Paulissen (penalty scored); Dudu (penalty scored); Diego (penalty scored); Tachibana (penalty scored)		(penalty scored) Mikael; (penalty scored) Sartori; (penalty scored) Fernando; (penalty scored) Cleiton; (penalty scored) Roberto

== Final ==
1 January 2024
17:30 UTC+8

Lee Man	2–2	Kitchee
Anier 2'; Gil 7'	Report	Mikael 9'; Mingazow 14'
Penalties
Anier (penalty missed); Paulissen (penalty scored); Dudu (penalty scored); Diego (penalty scored); Tachibana (penalty scored)	4–5	(penalty scored) Mikael; (penalty scored) Sartori; (penalty scored) Fernando; (penalty scored) Cleiton; (penalty scored) Roberto

Mong Kok Stadium, Mong Kok
Attendance: 2,978
Referee: Liu Kwok Man

**Lee Man**	**Kitchee**

GK	88	(Hong Kong) Yuen Ho Chun
LB	4	(Japan) Ryoya Tachibana
CB	5	(Hong Kong) Yu Wai Lim
AM	7	(Netherlands) Mitchel Paulissen	(yellow card) 58'
CF	9	(Estonia) Henri Anier	(yellow card) 52'
DM	16	(Hong Kong) Ngan Lok Fung (c)
RW	20	(Brazil) Paulinho Simionato	(yellow card) 65'	(substituted off) 85'
RB	26	(Hong Kong) Wong Chun Ho	(yellow card) 45'
CB	32	(Brazil) Dudu
DM	33	(Hong Kong) Diego Eli	(yellow card) 50'
LW	91	(Brazil) Gil
Substitutes:
GK	1	(Hong Kong) Ko Chun
GK	25	(Hong Kong) Poon Sheung Hei
GK	28	(Hong Kong) Chan Ka Ho
AM	10	(Argentina) Jonathan Acosta		(substituted on) 85'
RW	11	(Hong Kong) Cheng Siu Kwan
DM	18	(Hong Kong) Zachary Hui
LB	19	(Hong Kong) Yu Pui Hong
RB	21	(Hong Kong) Wong Long Kaa
CB	22	(Hong Kong) Jim Ho Chun
LB	31	(Hong Kong) Yung Hui To
Head coach:
(Hong Kong) Tsang Chiu Tat

GK	1	(Hong Kong) Wang Zhenpeng
DM	4	(England) Charlie Scott		(substituted off) 55'
LW	7	(Turkmenistan) Ruslan Mingazow
RW	8	(Brazil) Igor Sartori
CM	10	(Brazil) Cleiton	(yellow card) 34'
RB	11	(China) Ibrahim Kurban
CB	15	(Hong Kong) Roberto (c)	(yellow card) 66'
CM	17	(Brazil) Mikael
CB	26	(Hong Kong) Andy Russell
LB	77	(Hong Kong) Fernando
CF	89	(Austria) Jakob Jantscher		(substituted off) 80'
Substitutes:
GK	13	(China) Enikar Mehmud
GK	91	(Hong Kong) Tuscany Shek
CF	9	(South Korea) Kim Shin-wook
DM	19	(Hong Kong) Huang Yang		(substituted on) 55'
CM	24	(Hong Kong) Ngan Cheuk Pan
CF	27	(Uzbekistan) Sherzod Temirov		(substituted on) 80'
AM	28	(Hong Kong) Cheng Chin Lung
LW	31	(Hong Kong) Chen Ngo Hin
AM	32	(Hong Kong) Yuen Chun Him
CB	74	(Hong Kong) Kam Chi Kin
CF	96	(Hong Kong) Matthew Slattery
Head Coach:
(South Korea) Kim Dong-jin

Player of the Match:

Assistant Referees:
Fok Pong Shing
Cheng Kam Wing
Fourth Official:
Yu Kin Fung

**Match rules**

- 90 minutes
- Penalty shoot-out if scores still level
- Maximum of five substitutions

== Final Ranking ==
Pos	Team	Pld	W	D	L	GF	GA	GD	Pts
1st place, gold medalist(s)	Kitchee	2	2	0	0	7	2	+5	**6**
2nd place, silver medalist(s)	Lee Man	2	1	0	1	5	4	+1	**3**
3rd place, bronze medalist(s)	Rangers	2	1	0	1	5	3	+2	**3**
4	Eastern	2	0	0	2	0	8	−8	**0**

== Top scorers ==
Rank	Player	Club	Goals
1	(Brazil) Gil	Lee Man	3
2	(Estonia) Henri Anier	Lee Man	2
2	(Turkmenistan) Ruslan Mingazow	Kitchee	2
2	(Uzbekistan) Sherzod Temirov	Kitchee	2
2	(Nigeria) John Umeofia	Rangers	2
6	(Hong Kong) Au Yeung Yiu Chung	Rangers	1
6	(Hong Kong) Lau Chi Lok	Rangers	1
6	(Hong Kong) Leung Hoi Chun	Rangers	1
6	(Brazil) Mikael	Kitchee	1
6	(Hong Kong) Andy Russell	Kitchee	1
6	(England) Charlie Scott	Kitchee	1
