= Enson Kwok =

Australian soccer player

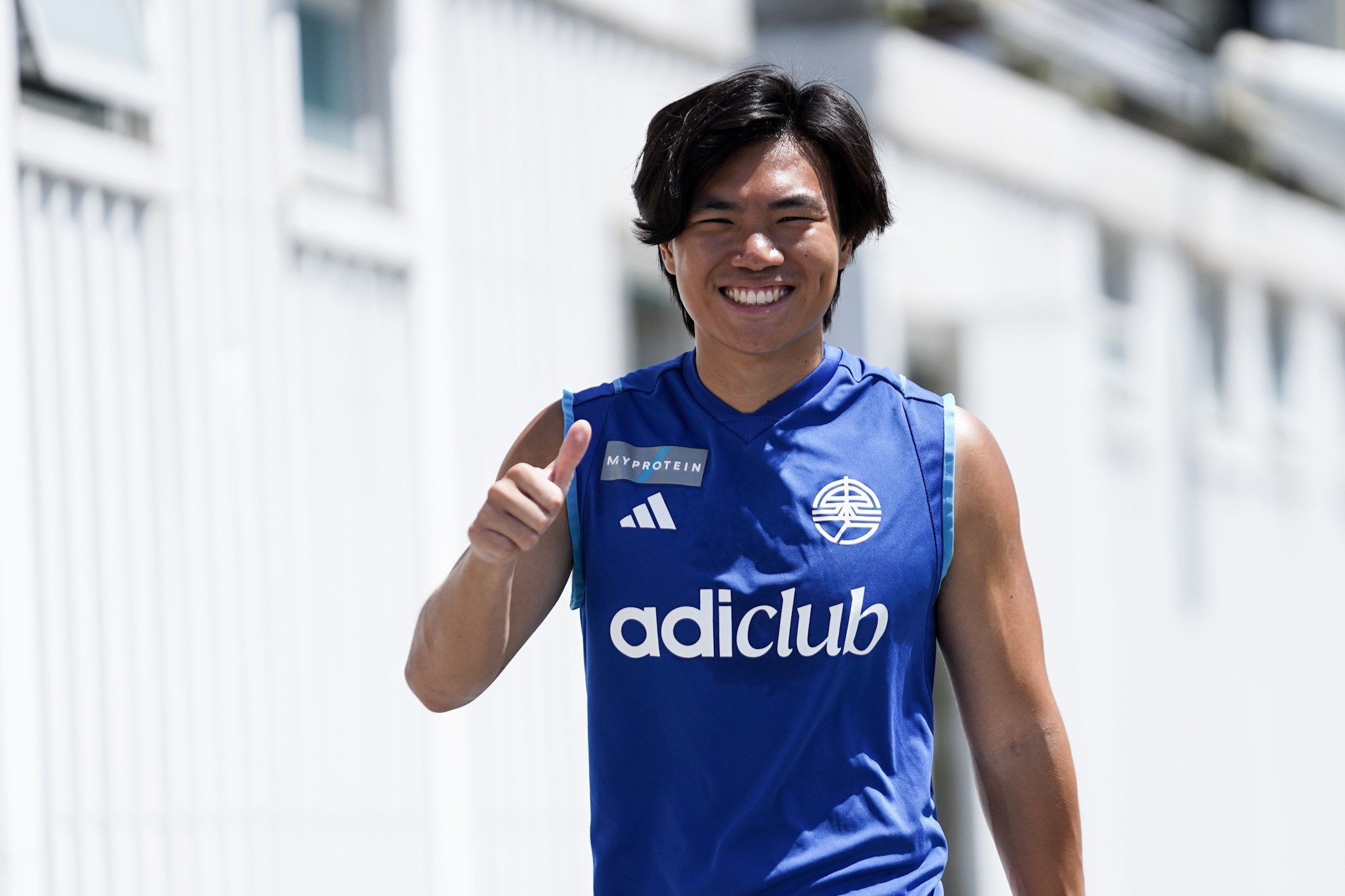

Personal information
- Full name: Enson Kwok Shung Ngai
- Date of birth: 11 November 1999 (age 27)
- Place of birth: Brisbane, Australia
- Height: 1.73 m (5 ft 8 in)
- Position: Right back

Youth career
- Kitchee
- Boreham Wood

Senior career*
Years	Team	Apps	(Gls)
2021–2022	Timok	4	(0)
2022–2023	Mačva Šabac	0	(0)
2023–2024	Eastern	4	(0)
2025–2026	Citizen	7	(0)
2026–	WSE	8	(0)
- * Club domestic league appearances and goals as of 26 May 2024

Enson Kwok Shung Ngai (Chinese: 郭祟毅; born 11 November 1999) is a former Hong Kong professional footballer who played as a right back.

== Club career ==
As a youth player, Kwok joined the youth academy of English side Boreham Wood.

In July 2021, Kwok signed for Serbian First League club Timok. On 27 November 2021, he debuted for the club during a 2–0 win over Budućnost (Dobanovci).

On 6 July 2022, Kwok signed for another Serbian First League club Mačva Šabac.

On 28 August 2023, Kwok returned to Hong Kong and signed for Eastern.

== International career ==
Kwok is eligible to represent Hong Kong internationally and Australia internationally, having been born there.

== Honour ==
Eastern

- Hong Kong FA Cup: 2023–24
