= Juninho (footballer, born December 1990) =

Brazilian-born Hong Kong footballer (born 1990)

Juninho 祖連奴
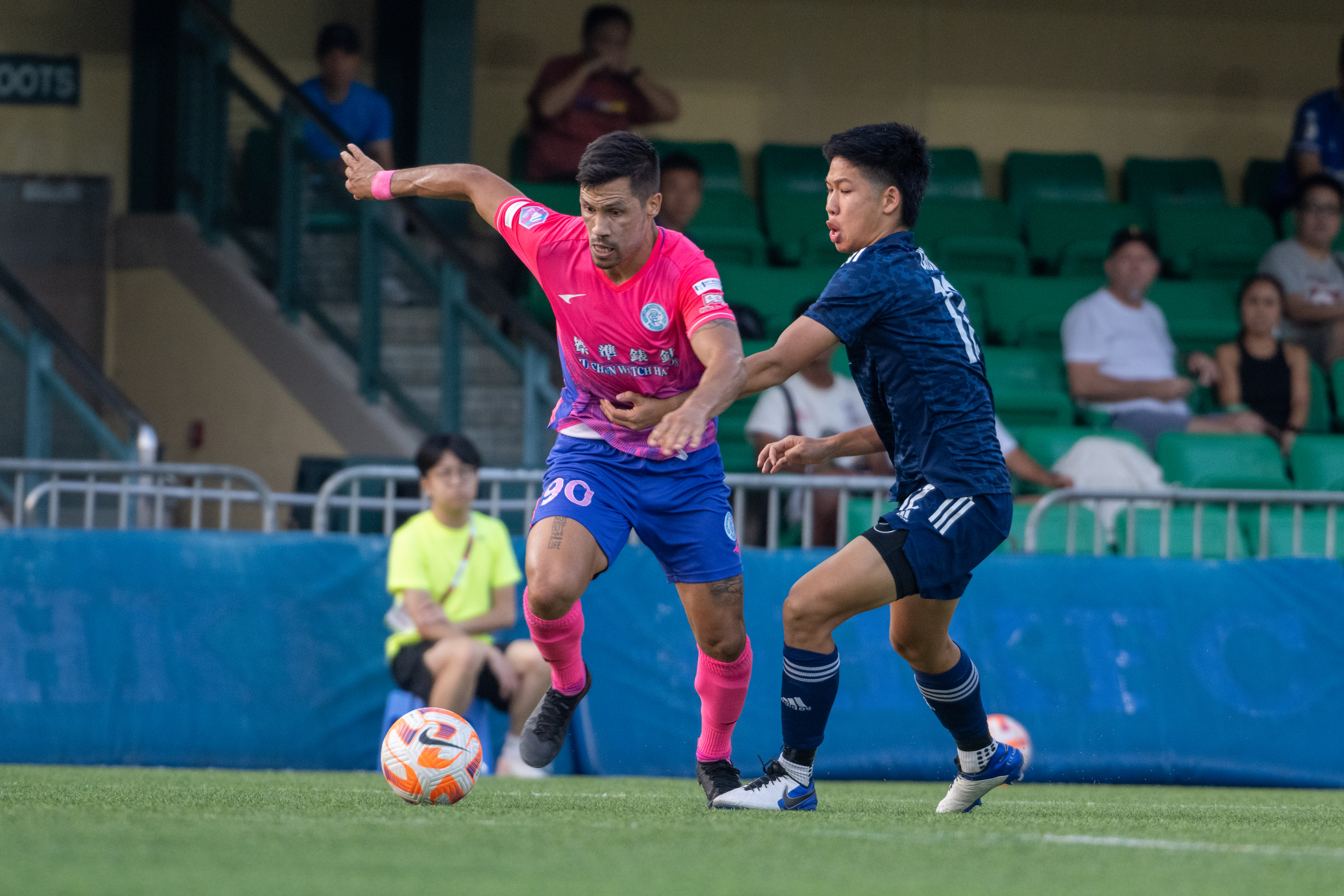

Personal information
- Full name: Walter Soares Belitardo Júnior
- Date of birth: 11 December 1990 (age 35)
- Place of birth: Caieiras, Brazil
- Height: 1.80 m (5 ft 11 in)
- Position: Striker

Team information
- Current team: Kitchee
- Number: 30

Senior career*
Years	Team	Apps	(Gls)
2007–2010	Santo André		
2009	São Bernardo		
2010	América-AM		
2011	Fernandópolis	4	(0)
2012	Votuporanguense		
2013	Barretos	8	(2)
2014	Paulista	4	(0)
2015	América		
2015	Barretos	5	(0)
2016	Sporting Macau	17	(15)
2016–2017	Tung Sing	22	(31)
2017–2018	Yuen Long	15	(2)
2018–2020	Pegasus	17	(3)
2019–2020	→ Yuen Long (loan)	9	(3)
2020–2023	Hong Kong Rangers	32	(11)
2023–	Kitchee	67	(26)

International career^{‡}
2024–	Hong Kong	29	(5)
Medal record
Men's football
Representing Hong Kong
FIFA ASEAN Challenge Cup
Winner	2026 Hong Kong
- * Club domestic league appearances and goals as of 21 November 2026 ‡ National team caps and goals as of 3 October 2026

Walter Soares Belitardo Júnior (born 11 December 1990), commonly known as Juninho (Chinese: 祖連奴), is a professional footballer who plays as a striker for Hong Kong Premier League club Kitchee. Born in Brazil, he plays for the Hong Kong national team.

== Club career ==
=== Sporting de Macau ===
After terminating his contract with Barretos in 2015 due to low pay and delays in payment, Juninho decided to move to Macau in search of a higher salary. He moved to Macau with the intention of signing a professional contract but due to a misunderstanding as to the professional opportunities in Macau, he was ultimately forced to play as an amateur for Sporting de Macau in order to continue his career.

=== Tung Sing ===
Juninho signed with Hong Kong Premier League club Dreams, then known as Biu Chun Glory Sky, in the summer of 2016. However, as the club later signed additional foreign players, BCGS did not have room on their squad to register him.

Juninho then moved to Tung Sing in September 2016. In his only season with the club, he scored 31 goals in 22 appearances, finishing third in the Golden Boot race.

=== Yuen Long ===
Following the 2016–17 season, Juninho went on trial with HKPL club Rangers but was not signed. A week before the 2017–18 season started, Juninho was signed to Yuen Long.

=== Pegasus ===
On 23 July 2018, it was announced at Pegasus' season opening event that the club had signed Juninho for the 2018–19 campaign.

=== Yuen Long ===
On 8 August 2019, Juninho was loaned to Yuen Long after Pegasus had signed a new foreign player. He rejoined the club after one year.

=== Rangers ===
On 17 October 2020, it was announced that Juninho was signed for Rangers.

=== Kitchee ===
On 12 July 2023, Juninho joined Kitchee.

== International career ==
On 8 December 2023, it was announced that Juninho had received his HKSAR passport after giving up his Brazilian passport, making him eligible to represent Hong Kong internationally. He was then subsequently called up for the local training camp in preparation of the 2023 AFC Asian Cup. On 26 December 2023, he was named in Hong Kong's final squad for the Asian Cup.

On 1 January 2024, Juninho made his international debut for Hong Kong in a friendly match against China.

On 5 September 2024, Juninho scored his first international goal against the Solomon Islands.

== Career statistics ==
=== International ===
As of 3 October 2026

National team	Year	Apps	Goals
Hong Kong	2024	14	2
Hong Kong	2025	11	2
Hong Kong	2026	3	1
Total		29	5

#	Date	Venue	Opponent	Result	Competition
2024
1	1 January 2024	Baniyas Stadium, Abu Dhabi, United Arab Emirates	China	2–1	Friendly
2	23 January 2024	Abdullah bin Khalifa Stadium, Doha, Qatar	Palestine	0–3	2023 AFC Asian Cup
3	21 March 2024	Mong Kok Stadium, Mong Kok, Hong Kong	Uzbekistan	0–2	2026 FIFA World Cup qualification – AFC second round
4	26 March 2024	Milliy Stadium, Tashkent, Uzbekistan	Uzbekistan	0–3	2026 FIFA World Cup qualification – AFC second round
5	6 June 2024	Hong Kong Stadium, So Kon Po, Hong Kong	Iran	2–4	2026 FIFA World Cup qualification – AFC second round
6	11 June 2024	Ashgabat Stadium, Ashgabat, Turkmenistan	Turkmenistan	0–0	2026 FIFA World Cup qualification – AFC second round
7	5 September 2024	HFC Bank Stadium, Suva, Fiji	Solomon Islands	3–0	Friendly
8	8 September 2024	Churchill Park, Lautoka, Fiji	Fiji	1–1	Friendly
9	10 October 2024	Rheinpark Stadion, Vaduz, Liechtenstein	Liechtenstein	0–1	Friendly
10	15 October 2024	Hong Kong Stadium, So Kon Po, Hong Kong	Cambodia	3–0	Friendly

=== International goals ===
Scores and results list Hong Kong's goal tally first.

No.	Date	Cap	Venue	Opponent	Score	Result	Competition
1.	5 September 2024	8	HFC Bank Stadium, Suva, Fiji	Solomon Islands	1–0	3–0	Friendly
2.	15 October 2024	11	Hong Kong Stadium, Hong Kong	Cambodia	3–0	3–0	Friendly
3.	7 September 2025	23	Kanchanaburi Province Stadium, Kanchanaburi, Thailand	Fiji	2–0	8–0	2025 King's Cup
4.	7 September 2025	23	Kanchanaburi Province Stadium, Kanchanaburi, Thailand	Fiji	5–0	8–0	2025 King's Cup
5.	5 June 2026	26	Hong Kong Stadium, Hong Kong	Mongolia	1–0	2–0	Friendly

== Honours ==
Yuen Long

- Hong Kong Senior Shield: 2017–18

Kitchee

- Hong Kong Premier League: 2025–26
- Hong Kong Senior Shield: 2023–24

Hong Kong

- FIFA ASEAN Challenge Cup: 2026
