= HKPLC Cup =

Hong Kong Premier League Committee Cup
- Founded: 2023
- Abolished: 2024
- Region: Hong Kong
- Teams: 4
- Last champions: Kitchee (1st title)
- Most championships: Kitchee (1 time)

The Hong Kong Premier League Committee Cup (Chinese: 香港超級聯賽會盃) was a football competition contested by clubs in the top-tier Hong Kong domestic football league. The cup was launched for the 2023–24 season during the time when the Hong Kong national football team was preparing for the 2023 AFC Asian Cup.

== Format ==
- Top four teams from the previous season of Hong Kong Premier League entered this competition. All teams compete in a compete in a single-elimination format. If the scores are level after 90 minutes, the teams play a penalty shootout.
- The number of foreign players teams can register is unlimited. Each team can register no more than 6 foreign or local guest players for the tournament.

== Finals ==
=== Key ===
†	Match decided by a penalty shootout after extra time

=== Results ===
Season	Winner	Score	Runners-up	Venue	Attendance
2023–24	Kitchee	2–2 †	Lee Man	Mong Kok Stadium	2,978

== Results by team ==
Team	Winners	Seasons won	Runners-up	Seasons runner-up
Kitchee	1	2023–24	–	–
Lee Man	–	–	1	2023–24

== See also ==
- The Football Association of Hong Kong, China
- Hong Kong Premier League
