= 2024–25 Eastern SC season =

Eastern
- Full name: Eastern Sports Club Football Team Limited (東方體育會足球隊有限公司)
- Founded: 1932; 94 years ago
- Ground: Mong Kok Stadium
- Capacity: 6,664
- Head Coach: Roberto Losada
- League: Hong Kong Premier League
- 2024–25: Hong Kong Premier League, 3rd of 11
- Website: football.easternlonglions.com
Home colours	Away colours

The 2024–25 season is Eastern's 70th season in the top-tier division in Hong Kong football. Eastern will compete in the 2024–25 Hong Kong Premier League, Senior Challenge Shield, FA Cup, Sapling Cup and AFC Champions League Two this season.

== Squad ==
=== First team ===
As of 9 January 2024

Squad No.	Name	Nationality	Date of birth (age)	Previous club	Contract since	Contract end
Goalkeepers
1	Yapp Hung Fai	(Hong Kong)	21 March 1990 (age 36)	(Hong Kong) South China AA	2014	2025
26	Liu Fu Yuen	(Hong Kong)	21 August 1990 (age 35)	(Hong Kong) Wong Tai Sin DRSC	2018	2025
Defenders
2	Calum Hall ^{FP}	(Scotland)	3 August 2000 (age 25)	(Scotland) Gala Fairydean Rovers (S5)	2023	2025
6	Aleksander Mitrovic^{FP}	(Serbia)	10 August 1998 (age 27)	(Serbia) FK Jedinstvo (S1)	2025	2025
19	Alexander Jojo	(Hong Kong) (England) (Sweden)	11 February 1999 (age 27)	(Norway) IK Oddevold (N2)	2024	2025
20	Carlos Pérez ^{FP}	(Colombia)	15 June 1995 (age 31)	(Ecuador) Técnico (E1)	2025	2025
21	Daniel Almazan ^{FP}	(Spain)	27 May 1999 (age 27)	(Puerto Rico) Bayamón Fútbol Club (P1)	2023	2025
22	Leung Kwun Chung	(Hong Kong)	1 April 1992 (age 34)	(Hong Kong) Tai Po	2019	2025
30	Wong Tsz Ho	(Hong Kong)	7 March 1994 (age 32)	Youth	2014	2025
72	Nii Noye Narh ^{FP}	(Norway) (Ghana)	9 December 1994 (age 31)	(Hong Kong) Sham Shui Po	2024	2025
Midfielders
16	Leung Chun Pong	(Hong Kong)	1 October 1986 (age 39)	(Hong Kong) South China AA	2016	2025
17	Clement Benhaddouche	(Hong Kong) (France)	11 May 1996 (age 30)	(China) Suzhou Dongwu	2025	2025
23	Ma Hei Wai	(Hong Kong)	3 February 2004 (age 22)	Youth	2020	2025
27	Marcos Gondra ^{FP}	(Spain)	1 January 1987 (age 39)	(Spain) CF Lorca Deportiva (S5)	2021	2025
32	Lam Hin Ting	(Hong Kong)	9 December 1999 (age 26)	Hong Kong Rangers	2024	2025
36	Gu Bin ^{FP}	(China)	10 November 1991 (age 34)	(China) Zhejiang Professional	2025	2025
Strikers
7	Noah Baffoe ^{FP}	(Spain) (Ghana)	21 May 1993 (age 33)	(Spain) CE Manresa (S5)	2023	2025
9	Víctor Bertomeu ^{FP}	(Spain)	19 October 1992 (age 33)	(Indonesia) Gresik United (I2)	2024	2025
10	Felipe Sá ^{FP}	(Brazil)	29 May 1995 (age 31)	(United Arab Emirates) Fujairah FC (U2)	2024	2025
99	Manolo Bleda	(Hong Kong) (Spain)	31 July 1990 (age 35)	(Hong Kong) Lee Man	2025	2025
Players out on loan
Players left during mid-season
3	Tamirlan Kozubayev ^{FP}	(Kyrgyzstan)	1 July 1994 (age 31)	(Kazakhstan) FC Turan (K1)	2022	2025
11	Wong Ho Chun	(Hong Kong)	2 April 2002 (age 24)	(Hong Kong) Lee Man	2022	2025
14	Yu Joy Yin	(Hong Kong)	8 October 2001 (age 24)	Hong Kong Rangers	2023	2025
15	Wong Ho Yin	(Hong Kong)	12 June 1998 (age 28)	(Hong Kong) HK U23 Football Team	2023	2025
17	Ng Yu Hei	(Hong Kong)	13 February 2006 (age 20)	Youth	2023	2025

Remarks:
^{FP} These players are registered as foreign players.

=== U22 ===
As of 10 June 2024

Squad No.	Name	Nationality	Date of birth (age)	Previous club	Contract since	Contract end
Goalkeepers
40	Chung Hoi Man	(Hong Kong)	2 January 2003 (age 23)	Youth	2021	2025
80	Mak Ka-Lun	(Hong Kong)	19 January 2006 (age 20)	Youth Team	2023	2025
	Tam Chi-To	(Hong Kong)	7 January 2007 (age 19)	(Hong Kong) Yuen Long Youth	2023	2025
Defenders
24	Siu Chung Nam	(Hong Kong)	2 January 2006 (age 20)	Youth Team	2023	2025
35	Lam Chin Yu	(Hong Kong)	5 March 2005 (age 21)	Youth	2023	2025
43	Uriel Contiero	(Hong Kong) (Italy)	7 November 2009 (age 16)	Youth Team	2023	2025
88	Cheung Man Ho	(Hong Kong)	15 April 2006 (age 20)	Youth	2023	2025
	Tsang Cheuk-Yin	(Hong Kong)	26 April 2006 (age 20)	Youth Team	2023	2025
	Takumi Ng	(Hong Kong)	20 November 2007 (age 18)	Youth Team	2023	2025
	Tsang Tak-Hin	(Hong Kong)	31 August 2007 (age 18)	Youth Team	2023	2025
	Cheung Cheuk-Nam	(Hong Kong)	29 June 2007 (age 18)	Hong Kong Rangers Youth	2024	2025
Midfielders
28	Siu Ching	(Hong Kong)	28 April 2008 (age 18)	Youth	2023	2025
42	Yeung Tung Ki	(Hong Kong)	18 September 2006 (age 19)	Youth	2022	2025
44	Prabhat Gurung	(Hong Kong) (Nepal)	14 July 2004 (age 21)	Youth	2022	2025
77	Lee Chun Ting	(Hong Kong)	1 June 2005 (age 21)	Youth	2022	2025
	Leung Tsz-Yin	(Hong Kong)	21 January 2009 (age 17)	Youth Team	2024	2025
	Lin Long-Tik	(Hong Kong)	21 January 2008 (age 18)	Youth Team	2024	2025
Forwards
29	Liu Hing Yau	(Hong Kong)	24 May 2006 (age 20)	Youth Team	2024	2025
33	Gao Ming Ho	(Hong Kong)	7 April 2008 (age 18)	Youth Team	2024	2025
	Chui Wai-Lok	(Hong Kong)	28 March 2006 (age 20)	Youth Team	2024	2025
	Jeremy Lui Tsz-Kiu	(Hong Kong)	8 May 2007 (age 19)	Youth Team	2024	2025
	Gao Ming Ngai	(Hong Kong)	7 April 2008 (age 18)	Youth Team	2024	2025
	Kwan Cheuk-Yin	(Hong Kong)	6 January 2009 (age 17)	Youth Team	2024	2025
	Josh Yiu Ho-Chit	(Hong Kong)	14 February 2007 (age 19)	Hong Kong Rangers Youth	2024	2025
Players who have played but left the team mid-season

== Transfers ==
=== Transfers in ===
Pre-Season

Position	Player	Transferred from	Ref
DF	(Spain) Nii Noye Narh	(Hong Kong) Sham Shui Po	Free
MF	(Hong Kong) Lam Hin Ting	Hong Kong Rangers	Free
FW	(Spain) Víctor Bertomeu	(Indonesia) Gresik United	Free
FW	(Brazil) Felipe Sá	(United Arab Emirates) Fujairah FC	Free

Mid-Season

Position	Player	Transferred from	Ref
DF	(Serbia) Aleksander Mitrovic	(Serbia) FK Jedinstvo	Free
DF	(Colombia) Carlos Pérez	(Ecuador) Técnico	Free
MF	(China) Gu Bin	(China) Zhejiang Professional	Free
MF	(Hong Kong) (France) Clement Benhaddouche	(China) Suzhou Dongwu	Free
FW	(Hong Kong) (Spain) Manolo Bleda	(Hong Kong) Lee Man FC	Free

=== Loans In ===
Position	Player	Transferred from	Ref
DF	(Hong Kong) (England) (Sweden) Alexander Jojo	(Norway) IK Oddevold	Season loan

=== Transfers out ===
Preseason

Position	Player	Transferred To	Ref
DF	(Hong Kong) (Australia) Enson Kwok		Free
DF	(South Korea) Ryu Ji-seong	(Hong Kong) Hoi King SA	Free
DF	(Hong Kong) (Scotland) Leon Jones	(Hong Kong) Kitchee SC	Free
MF	(Hong Kong) (Israel) Barak Braunshtain	Hong Kong Rangers	Free
FW	(Hong Kong) (Spain) Manolo Bleda	(Hong Kong) Lee Man	End of loan
FW	(Hong Kong) Bosley Yu	(Hong Kong) HKFC	Free

Mid-Season

Position	Player	Transferred To	Ref
DF	(Kyrgyzstan) Tamirlan Kozubayev	(Indonesia) Persita Tangerang	Undisclosed
DF	(Hong Kong) Wong Ho Yin	(Hong Kong) Southern	Free
MF	(Hong Kong) Yu Joy Yin	(China) Shijiazhuang Gongfu	Undisclosed
MF	(Hong Kong) Wong Ho Chun	(China) Qingdao Hainiu	Undisclosed
FW	(Hong Kong) Ng Yu Hei	(China) Chongqing Tonglianglong	Undisclosed

=== Loans Out ===
Position	Player	Transferred To	Ref

== Team statistics ==
=== Appearances and goals ===
As of 31 May 2025

No.	Pos.	Player	HKPL		FA Cup		Sapling Cup		Challenge Shield		AFC Champions League		Total	
No.	Pos.	Player	Apps.	Goals	Apps.	Goals	Apps.	Goals	Apps.	Goals	Apps.	Goals	Apps.	Goals
1	GK	(Hong Kong) Yapp Hung Fai	22	0	3	0	0	0	3	0	6	0	34	0
2	DF	(Scotland) Calum Hall	18+2	1	2	0	4	1	2+1	0	5+1	0	35	2
6	DF	(Serbia) Aleksander Mitrovic	10+2	3	1+1	0	2	0	1	0	0	0	17	3
7	FW	(Spain) (Ghana) Noah Baffoe	24	21	3	4	2+3	2	3	2	5+1	3	41	35
9	FW	(Spain) Víctor Bertomeu	8+6	4	2	0	4	2	3	2	3+1	0	25	8
10	FW	(Brazil) Felipe Sá	12+6	1	2+1	1	1+1	0	1+2	0	0+4	0	30	2
16	MF	(Hong Kong) Leung Chun Pong	17+5	1	2+1	0	1+1	0	1+2	0	4+2	0	35	1
17	MF	(Hong Kong) (France) Clement Benhaddouche	3+4	0	1+2	0	1	0	0	0	0	0	11	0
19	DF	(Hong Kong) (England) (Sweden) Alexander Jojo	17+3	2	2	0	0+1	0	2+1	0	4+2	0	32	2
20	DF	(Colombia) Carlos Pérez	8+2	0	3	0	0	0	0+1	0	0	0	14	0
21	DF	(Spain) Daniel Almazan	8	1	0	0	2	0	1	1	6	1	17	3
22	DF	(Hong Kong) Leung Kwun Chung	19+3	1	3	0	4	2	1	0	3+3	0	36	3
23	MF	(Hong Kong) Ma Hei Wai	19+4	5	2+1	0	2+1	0	3	0	3+2	0	37	5
26	GK	(Hong Kong) Liu Fu Yuen	2+1	0	0	0	2	0	0	0	0	0	5	0
27	MF	(Spain) Marcos Gondra	22	9	3	0	3+1	0	2	0	5	2	36	11
28	MF	(Hong Kong) Siu Ching	0+1	0	0	0	0	0	0	0	0	0	1	0
29	FW	(Hong Kong) Liu Hing Yau	0	0	0	0	0+1	0	0	0	0	0	1	0
30	DF	(Hong Kong) Wong Tsz Ho	8+6	0	1+1	0	3+1	0	2	0	3+2	0	27	0
32	MF	(Hong Kong) Lam Hin Ting	8+6	0	1+1	0	2+1	0	3	0	3+1	0	26	0
33	MF	(Hong Kong) Gao Ming Ho	0+6	0	0+1	0	0+1	1	0+1	0	0	0	9	1
35	DF	(Hong Kong) Lam Chin Yu	0+2	0	0	0	2+2	0	0	0	0	0	6	0
36	DF	(China) Gu Bin	5+5	0	1	0	1	0	0	0	0	0	12	0
40	GK	(Hong Kong) Chung Hoi Man	0	0	0	0	3	0	0	0	0	0	3	0
42	MF	(Hong Kong) Yeung Tung Ki	0+5	0	0	0	2+2	0	0	0	0+2	0	11	0
43	DF	(Hong Kong) (Italy) Uriel Contiero	0+1	0	0	0	0+1	0	0	0	0	0	2	0
44	MF	(Hong Kong) (Nepal) Prabhat Gurung	0	0	0+1	0	3+2	0	0	0	0+1	0	7	0
72	DF	(Norway) (Ghana) Nii Noye Narh	11+2	0	1+1	0	3	0	1	0	1+1	0	21	0
77	MF	(Hong Kong) Lee Chun Ting	4+7	2	0+1	0	3+1	0	0	0	0	0	16	2
88	DF	(Hong Kong) Cheung Man Ho	0	0	0	0	1+4	0	0	0	0	0	5	0
99	FW	(Hong Kong) (Spain) Manolo Bleda	1+3	0	0+2	0	0+2	0	0	0	0	0	8	0
Players who left during season
3	DF	(Kyrgyzstan) Tamirlan Kozubayev	6+1	0	0	0	1	0	2	0	6	0	16	0
11	MF	(Hong Kong) Wong Ho Chun	2+6	1	0	0	3	1	0+1	0	0+5	0	17	2
14	MF	(Hong Kong) Yu Joy Yin	5+2	0	0	0	0	0	2	0	6	0	15	0
15	DF	(Hong Kong) Wong Ho Yin	0+1	0	0	0	0	0	0	0	0	0	1	0
17	MF	(Hong Kong) Ng Yu Hei	4+3	1	0	0	0	0	0+1	0	3+2	1	13	2

== Competition ==
=== Hong Kong Premier League ===
30 August 2024 1	Eastern	2–0	Rangers	Mong Kok, Kowloon
20:00	Ma Hei Wai 5'; Bertomeu 35'; Lam Hin Ting (yellow card) 19'; Tamirlan Kozubayev (yellow card) 72'; Yapp Hung Fai (yellow card) 85'	Report	Ryota Hayashi (yellow card) 62'	Stadium: Mong Kok Stadium; Attendance: 2,010; Referee: Tam Ping Wun

22 September 2024 2	Kowloon City	1–1	Eastern	Sham Shui Po, Kowloon
16:00	Jojo 6' (o.g.); Yim Kai Cheuk Anson (yellow card) 62'; Chan Man Fai (yellow card) 69'; Diego Eli (yellow card) 76'; Nilton Soares Rodrigues (yellow card) 90+2'; Lam Hok Hei (yellow card) 90+2'	Report	Bertomeu 90+13' (yellow card) 71'; Yu Joy Yin (yellow card) 40'; Daniel Almazan Vera (yellow card) 61'; Alexander Jojo (yellow card) 90+6'	Stadium: Sham Shui Po Sports Ground; Attendance: 449; Referee: Poon Chun Kit

2 February 2025 3 (Rescheduled)	Kitchee	3–0	Eastern	Mong Kok, Kowloon
18:00	Temirov 8'; Fernando 31'; Rey 45+4'; Dantes Matheus (yellow card) 12'; Luís Machado (yellow card) 75'; Welthon (yellow card) 90'	Report	Callum Hall (yellow card) 14'; Alexander Jojo (yellow card) 46'	Stadium: Mong Kok Stadium; Attendance: 1,589; Referee: Liu Kwok Man

6 October 2024 4	Lee Man	1–2	Eastern	Tseung Kwan O, New Territories
18:00	Mitchel Paulissen 58' (pen.) (yellow card) 54'; Henri Anier (yellow card) 44'; Li Ngai Hoi (yellow card) 71'; Timothy Chow (yellow card) 90+3'	Report	Ma Hei Wai 21'; Marcos Gondra 64' (yellow card) 50'; Yu Joy Yin (yellow card) 90+3'	Stadium: Tseung Kwan O Sports Ground; Attendance: 1,050; Referee: Liu Kwok Man

19 October 2024 5	Eastern	4–0	HKFC	Mong Kok, Kowloon
18:00	Leung Kwun Chung 40'; Gondra 51', 90+3'; Noah Baffoe 78'	Report	Andrew Russell (yellow card) 22'; Habib Bah (yellow card) 68'; Tsang Chun Hin (yellow card) 90'	Stadium: Mong Kok Stadium; Attendance: 484; Referee: Luk Kin-sun

2 November 2024 6	Tai Po	1–1	Eastern	Tai Po, New Territories
15:00	Renner 56'; Gabriel Cividini (yellow card) 73' (yellow-red card) 90+1'; Lee Ka Ho (yellow card) 86'	Report	Baffoe 9'; Daniel Almazan Vera (yellow card) 68'	Stadium: Tai Po Sports Ground; Attendance: 1,462; Referee: Tam Ping Wun

10 November 2024 7	Eastern	2–1	North District	Mong Kok, Kowloon
15:00	Gondra 8' (yellow card) 90'; Baffoe 60'; Felipe Sá (yellow card) 63'; Ng Yu Hei (yellow card) 85'	Report	Chulapa 54'; Law Hiu Chung (yellow card) 24'	Stadium: Mong Kok Stadium; Attendance: 596; Referee: Cheung Wai Lung

5 March 2025 8 (Rescheduled)	Eastern	2–1	Southern	Mong Kok, Kowloon
18:00	Baffoe 51'; Aleksander Mitrovic 74'; Gu Bin (yellow card) 27'; Callum Hall (yellow card) 62'; Marcos Gonda (yellow card) 83'; Lee Chun Ting (yellow card) 88'	Report	Gregory Rocha 66'; Kessi (yellow card) 37'; Lai Kak Yi (yellow card) 67'; Kawase Kota (yellow card) 76'	Stadium: Mong Kok Stadium; Attendance: 454; Referee: Poon Chun Kit

12 September 2024 9 (Rescheduled)	Eastern	5–1	North District	Mong Kok, Kowloon
20:00	Bertomeu 9'; Almazan 13'; Baffoe 29'; Wong Ho Chun 48'; Ng Yu Hei 52'	Report	Gudula 64'; Guilherme Kayron (yellow card) 59'	Stadium: Mong Kok Stadium; Attendance: 768; Referee: Woo Chun Sing

28 September 2024 10 (Rescheduled)	Southern	0–2	Eastern	Aberdeen, Hong Kong Island
16:00	Kessi (yellow card) 39'; Lee Ka Yiu (yellow card) 81'; Gregory Rocha (yellow card) 90+3'	Report	Gondra 49' (yellow card) 90+5'; Baffoe 76' (yellow card) 90+5'; Leung Chun Pong (yellow card) 61'; Yu Joy Yin (yellow card) 90+3'	Stadium: Aberdeen Sports Ground; Attendance: 540; Referee: Ho Wai Sing

12 January 2025 11	HKFC	0–2	Eastern	Happy Valley, Hong Kong Island
16:30	Andrew Russell (yellow card) 23'; Félix Alejandro Pérez-Doyle (yellow card) 29'; Callum Thomas Beattie (yellow card) 90+1'; Marcus McMillan (yellow card) 90+4'; Toby Philip Down (red card) 90+8'	Report	Marcos Gondra 78'; Ma Hei-wai 84'; Leung Chun Pong (yellow card) 90+4'; Lam Hin Ting (red card) 90+8'	Stadium: Hong Kong Football Club Stadium; Attendance: 832; Referee: Wong Po-sing

18 January 2025 12	Eastern	1-1	Kitchee	Mong Kok, Kowloon
18:00	Baffoe 32' (pen.); Nii Noye Narh (yellow card) 45+4'; Leung Kwun Chung (yellow card) 57'; Ma Hei Wai (yellow card) 66'; JoJo Alexander (yellow card) 81'	Report	Machado 16'; Talley Flynn (yellow card) 30'; Law Tsz Chun (yellow card) 49'; Dantes Matheus (yellow card) 78'	Stadium: Mong Kok Stadium; Attendance: 1,748; Referee: Tam Ping Wun

8 February 2025 13	Eastern	2–0	Southern	Mong Kok, Kowloon
18:00	Baffoe 45+6' (pen.), 90+4'; Carlos Perez (yellow card) 39'; Marcos Gondra (yellow card) 41'; Felipe (yellow card) 66'	Report	Lee Ka Yiu (yellow card) 29'; Kawase Kota (yellow card) 36'; Wong Ho Yin (yellow card) 36'; Gregory (yellow card) 45+1'; Lai Kak Yi (yellow card) 65'; Shu Sasaki (yellow card) 70'; Chak Ting Fung (yellow card) 75'; Chan Hoi Pak (yellow card) 81'	Stadium: Mong Kok Stadium; Attendance: 723; Referee: Wong Po Sing

16 February 2025 14	Eastern	3–4	Lee Man	Mong Kok, Kowloon
18:00	Gondra 45+6' (yellow card) 14'; Jojo 48'; Leung Chun Pong 57'; Víctor Bertomeu (red card) 89'	Report	Wong Wai 19', 79'; Rosa 71'; Paulinho 77' (yellow card) 90+2'; Everton (yellow card) 14'; Li Ngai Hoi (yellow card) 30'; Ryan Tafazolli (yellow card) 54'; Yu Wai Lim (yellow card) 74'	Stadium: Mong Kok Stadium; Attendance: 1,202; Referee: Yu Kin Fung

23 February 2025 15	Kowloon City	1–5	Eastern	Sham Shui Po, Kowloon
15:00	Fung Tin Wing 18'; Kang Jun-Hyeon (yellow card) 61'; Abdoulaye Sané (yellow card) 70'; Au Yeung Yiu Chung (yellow card) 76'	Report	Sá 11'; Baffoe 42', 81'; Aleksander Mitrovic 85'; Jojo 90+11'	Stadium: Sham Shui Po Sports Ground; Attendance: 685; Referee: Wong Wai Lun

8 March 2025 16	Rangers	1–3	Eastern	Tsing Yi, New Territories
18:00	Nassam Ibrahim 45+5'; Ansar Maxwell (yellow card) 21'; Yiu Ho Ming (yellow card) 61'; Barak Braunshtain (yellow card) 90+1'	Report	Noah Baffoe 12'; Marcos Gondra 25', 59'; Leung Kwun Chung (yellow card) 10'; Wong Tsz Ho (yellow card) 89'	Stadium: Tsing Yi Sports Ground; Referee: Woo Chun-sing

16 March 2025 17	Tai Po	1–3	Eastern	Tai Po, New Territories
15:00	Chan Siu Kwan 23'; Habib (yellow card) 30'; Lee Ka Ho (yellow card) 77'; Patrick Valverde (yellow card) 82'; Gabriel Cividini (yellow card) 90+5'	Report	Aleksander Mitrovic 73' (yellow card) 21'; Noah Baffoe 74', 90+3' (yellow card) 12'; Jojo (yellow card) 90'; Leung Kwun Chung (yellow card) 90+9'	Stadium: Tai Po Sports Ground; Referee: Tam Ping-wun

29 March 2025 18	Eastern	1–1	HKFC	Mong Kok, Kowloon
18:00	Noah Baffoe 47'	Report	Callum Beattie 77'; Jesus Salazar (yellow card) 77'; Jack Sealy (yellow card) 80'; Freddie Toomer (yellow card) 90+4'	Stadium: Mong Kok Stadium; Referee: Wong Po-Sing

13 April 2025 19	Eastern	3–3	Tai Po	Mong Kok, Kowloon
18:00	Hall 31'; Ma Hei Wai 60' (yellow card) 27'; Baffoe 84' (pen.); Leung Kwun Chung (yellow card) 45+3'; Marcos Gondra (yellow card) 52'; Lam Ting Hin (yellow card) 90+10'	Report	Lucas 2', 6'; Sartori 55'; Weverton (yellow card) 33'; Gabriel Cividini (yellow card) 84'; Law Chun Ting (yellow card) 85'	Stadium: Mong Kok Stadium; Attendance: 2,455; Referee: Wong Wai Lun

26 April 2025 20	Lee Man	2–1	Eastern	Tseung Kwan O, New Territories
18:00	Dudu 67'; Ryoya Tachibana 70'; Ryan Tafazolli (yellow card) 20'; Wong Wai (yellow card) 27'; Wong Chun Ho (yellow card) 64'	Report	Lee Chun Ting 82'; Yeung Tung Ki (yellow card) 84'	Stadium: Tseung Kwan O Sports Ground; Attendance: 1,225; Referee: Luk Kin-sun

5 May 2025 21	Eastern	3–1	Kowloon City	Mong Kok, Kowloon
15:00	Lee Chun Ting 43'; Baffoe 57', 88' (pen.) (yellow card) 90+10'	Report	Yang Chao Jing 45'; Kang Jun-hyeon (yellow card) 40'; Diego Eli 71'; Yu Pui Hong (yellow card) 73'; Sane Abodulaye (yellow card) 90+13'	Stadium: Mong Kok Stadium; Attendance: 655; Referee: Liu Kwok-man

11 May 2025 22	North District	0–1	Eastern	Sheung Shui, New Territories
15:00	Law Hiu Chung (yellow card) 43'; Mariano Santos (yellow card) 55'; Weverton (yellow card) 78'	Report	Marcos Gondra 7'; Leung Kwun Chung (yellow card) 43'; Alexander Jojo (yellow card) 78'; Víctor Bertomeu (yellow card) 90+4'	Stadium: North District Sports Ground; Attendance: 303; Referee: Luk Kin-sun

18 May 2025 23	Rangers	0–4	Eastern	Tsing Yi, New Territories
18:00	Nassam Ibrahim (yellow card) 36'; Luizinho (yellow card) 42'; Fernando Lopes (yellow card) 69'; Kang Hyun (yellow card) 82'; Yiu Ho Ming (yellow card) 83'	Report	Baffoe 19' (pen.), 55' (yellow card) 69'; Ma Hei Wai 29'; Víctor Bertomeu 50'; Lam Hin Ting (yellow card) 22'	Stadium: Tsing Yi Sports Ground; Attendance: 334; Referee: Poon Chun-kit

25 May 2025 24	Eastern	1–1	Kitchee	Mong Kok, Kowloon
15:00	Baffoe 84' (pen.); Víctor Bertomeu (yellow card) 69'; Siu Ching (yellow card) 90'	Report	Sherzod Temirov 70' (pen.); Matheus Dantes (yellow card) 52'; Leon Jones (yellow card) 82'	Stadium: Mong Kok Stadium; Attendance: 787; Referee: Yu Kin-fung

Pos	Team	Pld	W	D	L	GF	GA	GD	Pts	Qualification or relegation
1	Tai Po (C)	24	17	4	3	62	31	+31	55	Qualification for AFC Champions League Two group stage
2	Lee Man	24	17	2	5	54	33	+21	53	
3	Eastern	24	15	6	3	54	25	+29	51	Qualification for AFC Champions League Two group stage (Note: Eastern qualified for the AFC Champions League Two group stage as the 2024–25 Hong Kong FA Cup winners.)
4	Kitchee	24	12	6	6	55	25	+30	42	
5	Southern	24	7	7	10	34	35	−1	28	

Source: Hong Kong Football Association
Rules for classification: 1) Points; 2) Head-to-head points; 3) Head-to-head goal difference; 4) Head-to-head goals scored; 5) Goal difference; 6) Goals scored; 7) Fair-play points; 8) Drawing lots (Play-off if the winner has to be decided).
(C) Champions

=== Hong Kong Sapling Cup ===
13 October 2024 Group Match 1	Tai Po	2–1	Eastern	Tai Po, New Territories
15:00	Sartori 12'; Cividini 82'	Report	Leung Kwun Chung 54'	Stadium: Tai Po Sports Ground; Attendance: 586; Referee: Ho Wai Sing

16 November 2024 Group Match 2	Eastern	4–0	HKFC	Tsing Yi, New Territories
18:00	Bertomeu 6', 38'; Hall 11'; Wong Ho Chun 72'; Leung Kwun Chung (yellow card) 86'	Report	Habib Bah (yellow card) 56'; Tsang Chun-Hin (yellow card) 59'; Daniel Scally (yellow card) 64'	Stadium: Tsing Yi Sports Ground; Attendance: 217; Referee: Poon Chun Kit

15 December 2024 Group Match 3	North District	1–3	Eastern	Sheung Shui, New Territories
15:00	Yip Cheuk Man 34'; Ho Chun Ting (yellow card) 66'; Samuel Wong (yellow card) 44' (yellow-red card) 73'	Report	Baffoe 59', 90+4'; Leung Kwun Chung 67'; Callum Hall (yellow card) 70'	Stadium: North District Sports Ground; Attendance: 221; Referee: Cheung Wai Lung

22 March 2025 Group Match 4	Eastern	1–1	Kitchee	Siu Sai Wan, Hong Kong Island
18:00	Gao Ming Ho 86'; Yeung Tung Ki (yellow card) 34'	Report	Jay Haddow 50' (yellow card) 72'; Matheus Dantas (yellow card) 87'	Stadium: Siu Sai Wan Sports Ground; Referee: Luk Kin-sun

9 April 2025 Semi Final	Southern	1–0	Eastern	Mong Kok
15:00 UTC+8	Pereira 90+4' (pen.); Sohgo Ichikawa (yellow card) 25'; Song Ju-ho (yellow card) 55'	Report	Nii Noye Narh (yellow card) 80'	Stadium: Mong Kok Stadium; Attendance: 716; Referee: Tam Ping Wun

=== Hong Kong FA Cup ===
2 March 2025 Quarter Final	Eastern	3–0	Kowloon City	Sham Shui Po
15:00	Noah Baffoe 21', 25'; Felipe Sá 48'	Report	Diego Eli (yellow card) 59'; Kayron (yellow card) 75'; Yu Piu Hong (yellow card) 90+3'	Stadium: Sham Shui Po Sports Ground; Attendance: 543; Referee: Poon Chun-kit

20 April 2025 Semi Final	Tai Po	1–2 (a.e.t.)	Eastern	Mong Kok
15:00 UTC+8	Michel Renner Lopes Antunes 45+2' (pen.); Fung Kwun Ming (yellow card) 35'	Report	Noah Baffoe 30', 112' (pen.); Felipe Sá (yellow card) 40'; Lam Hin Tin (yellow card) 90+5'	Stadium: Mong Kok Stadium; Attendance: 2,193; Referee: Yu Kin-fung

31 May 2025 Final	Rangers	1–3	Eastern	Mong Kok
15:00 UTC+8	Lau Chi Lok 9'; Ryota Hayashi (yellow card) 7'; Maxwell Ansah (yellow card) 73' (yellow-red card) 87'	Report	Noah Baffoe 80', 81', 84' (yellow card) 85'; Carlos Pérez (yellow card) 90+7'	Stadium: Mong Kok Stadium; Attendance: 3,392; Referee: Tam Ping Wun

=== Hong Kong Senior Challenge Shield ===
23 November 2024 Quarter Final	Eastern	1–0	Southern	Tsing Yi, New Territories
18:30	Víctor Bertomeu 1'; Tamirlan Kozubaev (yellow card) 90+1'	Report	Kessi (yellow card) 70'; Paco Chan Hoi-Pak (yellow card) 88'; Jackson Franklim de Sousa (yellow card) 90+1'	Stadium: Tsing Yi Sports Ground; Referee: Tam Ping-wun

30 November 2024 Semi Final	Rangers	1–3	Eastern	Tseung Kwan O Sports Ground
15:00	Lau Chi Lok 44'; Lee Ching (yellow card) 45+1'; Akito Okamoto (yellow card) 45+2'; Ryota Hayashi (yellow card) 55'	Report	Baffoe 10', 90+2'; Daniel Almazan Vera 50' (yellow card) 39'; Ng Yu Hei (yellow card) 70'	Attendance: 509; Referee: Luk Kin Sun

30 January 2025 Final	Eastern	1–0	Lee Man	Mong Kok Stadium
15:00	Bertomeu 32'; Leung Kwun Chung (yellow card) 15'; Alexander Jojo (yellow card) 42'; Aleksandar Mitrović (yellow card) 52'	Report	Wong Chun Ho (yellow card) 38'; Ryoya Tachibana (yellow card) 55'; Mitchel Paulissen (yellow card) 60'; Lau Ka Kiu (yellow card) 82'	Attendance: 4,495; Referee: Ho Wai Sing

=== AFC Champions League Two ===
==== Group stage ====
Pos	Team	Pld	W	D	L	GF	GA	GD	Pts	Qualification	SFR	SYD	KAY	EAS
1	(Japan) Sanfrecce Hiroshima	6	5	1	0	14	5	+9	16	Advance to round of 16	—	2–1	3–0	4–1
2	(Australia) Sydney FC	6	4	0	2	17	6	+11	12	Advance to round of 16	0–1	—	3–1	5–0
3	(Philippines) Kaya–Iloilo	6	1	1	4	6	14	−8	4		1–1	1–4	—	1–2
4	(Hong Kong) Eastern	6	1	0	5	7	19	−12	3		2–3	1–4	1–2	—

Source: AFC
Rules for classification: Tiebreakers

19 September 2024 1	Sydney FC (Australia)	5–0	(Hong Kong) Eastern	Sydney, Australia
	Ouahim 32', 55' (yellow card) 32'; Grant 44'; Almazan 64' (o.g.); Leung Chun Pong 71' (o.g.)	Report	Lam Hin Ting (yellow card) 30'; Leung Chun Pong (yellow card) 61'	Stadium: Jubilee Oval, Sydney; Attendance: 4,021; Referee: Thoriq Alkatiri (Indonesia)

3 October 2024 2	Eastern (Hong Kong)	2–3	(Japan) Sanfrecce Hiroshima	Mong Kok Stadium, Hong Kong
	Almazan 7'; Baffoe 46'; Jesse Yu Joy Yin (yellow card) 40'	Report	Matsumoto 40'; Nakajima 41'; Araki 90+5'; Pieros Sotiriou (yellow card) 24'; Shuto Nakano (yellow card) 90+2'	Attendance: 4,365; Referee: Wiwat Jumpaoon (Thailand)

24 October 2024 3	Kaya–Iloilo (Philippines)	1–2	(Hong Kong) Eastern	Manila, Philippines
	Yamazaki 45+2' (pen.); Jesus Melliza (yellow card) 41'; Audie Menzi (yellow card) 90+6'	Report	Gondra 28'; Baffoe 78'; Daniel Almazan (yellow card) 20'; Wong Tsz Ho (yellow card) 45+2'	Stadium: Rizal Memorial Stadium; Attendance: 138; Referee: Zaid Thamer Mohammed (Iraq)

7 November 2024 4	Eastern (Hong Kong)	1–2	(Philippines) Kaya–Iloilo	Hong Kong
	Marcos Gondra 70'; Yapp Hung Fai (yellow card) 30'; Lam Hin Ting (yellow card) 41'; Felipe Sá (yellow card) 90+5'	Report	Daizo Horikoshi 32'; Robert Lopez Mendy 87'; Martini Rey (yellow card) 7'; Jovin Bedic (yellow card) 59' (yellow-red card) 69'; Walid Birrou (yellow card) 63'	Stadium: Mong Kok Stadium; Referee: Yousif Saeed Hasan(Iraq)

28 November 2024 5	Eastern (Hong Kong)	1–4	(Australia) Sydney FC	Hong Kong
	Noah Baffoe 49' (penalty missed) 90+3; Marcos Gondra (yellow card) 11'; Daniel Almazan (yellow card) 61'	Report	Anas Ouahim 5', 41', 62' (pen.) (yellow card) 75'; Patryk Klimala 17' (yellow card) 80'; Hayden Matthews (yellow card) 21'	Stadium: Mong Kok Stadium; Referee: Abdulla Al-Marri (Qatar)

5 December 2024 6	Sanfrecce Hiroshima (Japan)	4–1	(Hong Kong) Eastern	Hiroshima, Japan
	Toshihiro Aoyama 36' (yellow card) 44'; Gonçalo Paciência 53'; Yotaro Nakajima 57'; Pieros Sotiriou 73'	Report	Ng Yu Hei 10'; Wong Tsz Ho (yellow card) 27'	Stadium: Edion Peace Wing Hiroshima; Referee: Thoriq Alkatiri (Indonesia)

=== Hong Kong U22 League ===
19 March 2025 1 (Rescheduled)	Eastern	0–3	Lee Man	Tseung Kwan O, New Territories
20:30		Report		Stadium: Jockey Club HKFA Football Training Centre

16 October 2024 2	North District	1–2	Eastern	Siu Sai Wan, Eastern District
20:30	Weverton Gudula 14'	Report	Siu Ching 60'; Cheung Man Ho 68'	Stadium: Siu Sai Wan Sports Ground

30 October 2024 3	Eastern	1–3	Tai Po	Tseung Kwan O, New Territories
20:30	Leung Tsz Hin 8'	Report	Krisna R Korani 6'; Lee Kok Him 56'; Kwok Chun Nok 76'	Stadium: Jockey Club HKFA Football Training Centre

19 February 2025 4 (Rescheduled)	Kitchee	2–0	Eastern	Tin Shui Wai, Hong Kong
18:30	Li Siu Kin 25'; Matthew Slattery 31'	Report		Stadium: Tin Yip Road Park

19 November 2024 5	Eastern	1–5	Rangers	Siu Sai Wan, Eastern District
20:30	Liu Hing Yau 9'	Report	Luizinho 10', 42', 65', 71'; Ma Yung Sang 30'	Stadium: Siu Sai Wan Sports Ground

11 December 2024 6	Lee Man	0–4	Eastern	Tseung Kwan O, New Territories
20:30		Report	Liu Hing Yau 37', 48'; Yeung Tung Ki 56'; Chui Wai Lok 79'	Stadium: Jockey Club HKFA Football Training Centre

18 December 2024 7	Eastern	1–7	HKFC	Tin Shui Wai, Hong Kong
20:30	Lee Chun Ting 4'	Report	Auston Kranick 15'; Tsang Chun Hin 41'; Jesus Salazar 55'; Kwok Yat Pak 57', 75'; Li Chung Hang 85'; Chen Tao 86'	Stadium: Tin Yip Road Park

8 January 2025 8	Southern	2–0	Eastern	Tin Shui Wai, Hong Kong
20:30	Yau Cheuk Fung 15'; Lee Ka Yiu 83'	Report		Stadium: Tin Yip Road Park

15 January 2025 9	Eastern	1–2	North District	Tseung Kwan O, New Territories
20:30	Siu Ching 15'	Report	Matheus Chulapa 12', 24'	Stadium: Jockey Club HKFA Football Training Centre

5 February 2025 10	Tai Po	3–1	Eastern	Tin Shui Wai, Hong Kong
20:30	Patrick Valverde 10'; Krisna R Korani 15'; Gerson 39'	Report	Lee Chun Ting 25' (pen.)	Stadium: Tin Yip Road Park

11 February 2025 11	Eastern	0–5	Kitchee	Siu Sai Wan, Eastern District
19:30		Report	Matthew Slattery 5', 17', 40'; Lam Pak Yin 62'; Chen Tao 90+2'	Stadium: Siu Sai Wan Sports Ground

26 February 2025 12	Rangers	3–0	Eastern	Tseung Kwan O, New Territories
20:30	Maxwell Ansan 26'; Vito Wong To Lam 40'; Ma Yung Sang 76'	Report		Stadium: Jockey Club HKFA Football Training Centre

11 March 2025 13	Eastern	0–2	Southern	Tseung Kwan O, New Territories
20:30		Report	Mahama Awal 73', 84'	Stadium: Jockey Club HKFA Football Training Centre

2 April 2025 14	HKFC	0–2	Eastern	Tseung Kwan O, New Territories
20:30		Report	Lee Chun Ting 54'; Cheung Man Ho 88'	Stadium: Jockey Club HKFA Football Training Centre

League table

Pos	Team	Pld	W	D	L	GF	GA	GD	Pts	Qualification or relegation
1	Rangers	14	12	0	2	46	15	+31	36	Winner
2	Southern	14	10	1	3	23	11	+12	31	
3	Tai Po	14	9	1	4	33	21	+12	28	
4	Kitchee	14	8	1	5	30	16	+14	25	
5	HKFC	14	6	1	7	30	23	+7	19	
6	North District	14	4	1	9	22	40	−18	13	
7	Eastern	14	3	0	11	13	38	−25	9	
8	Lee Man	14	1	1	12	9	42	−33	4	

Updated to match(es) played on 31 May 2025. Source: Hong Kong Football Association
Rules for classification: 1) Points; 2) Head-to-head points; 3) Head-to-head goal difference; 4) Head-to-head goals scored; 5) Goal difference; 6) Goals scored; 7) Fair-play points; 8) Drawing lots (Play-off if the winner has to be decided).

=== Hong Kong U22 FA Cup ===
7 May 2025 Quarter Final	Lee Man	0–1	Eastern	Tseung Kwan O, New Territories
		Report	Gao Ming Ho 45+1' (pen.)	Stadium: Jockey Club HKFA Football Training Centre

14 May 2025 Semi Final	Kitchee	3–1	Eastern	Kowloon, Hong Kong
	Chen Ngo Hin 42'; Yeung Cheuk Kwan 57'; Juninho 71'	Report	Ma Hei Wai 54'	Stadium: Kowloon Bay Park
