= Yu Joy Yin =

Hong Kong footballer

Yu Joy Yin 余在言
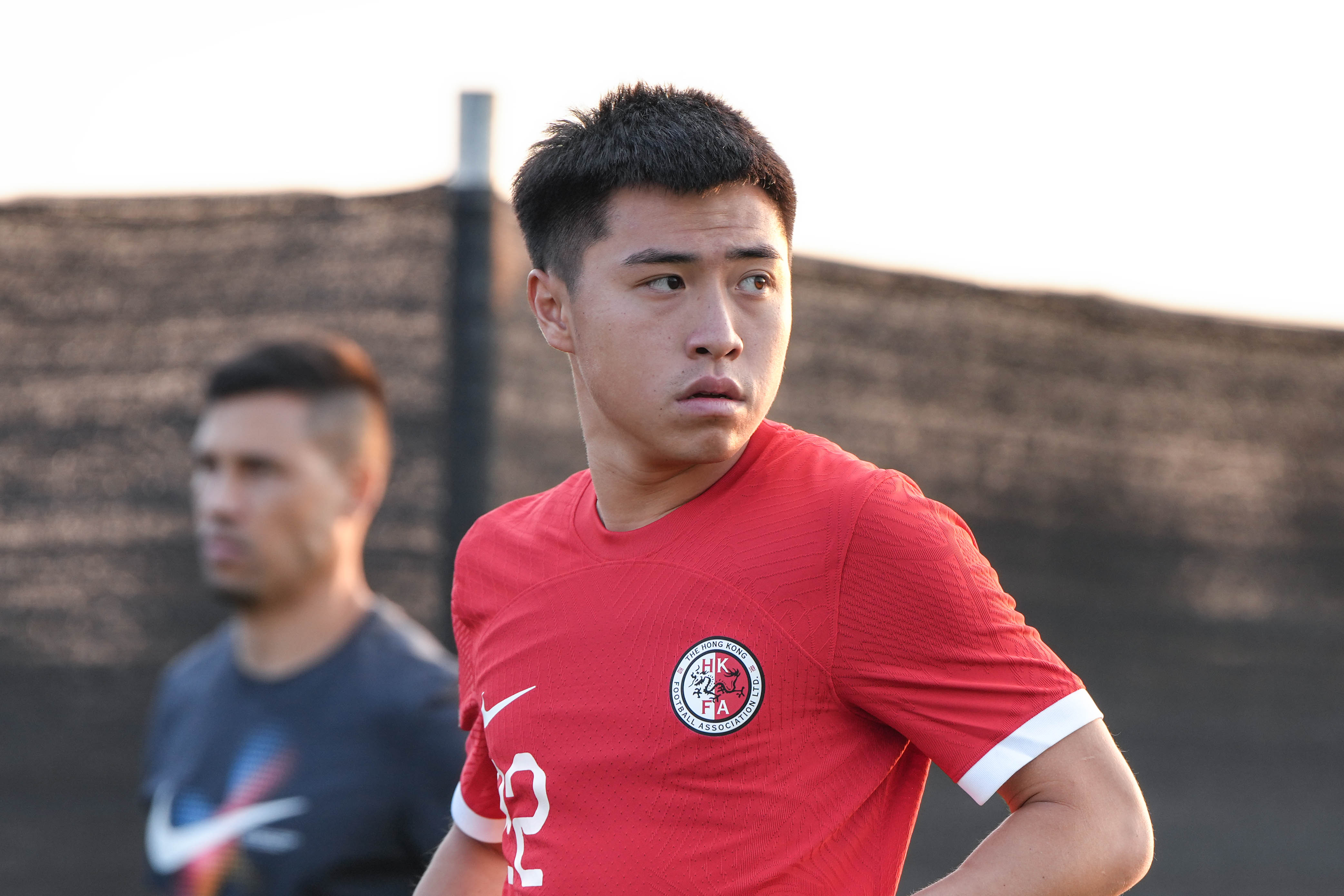

Personal information
- Full name: Jesse Yu Joy Yin
- Date of birth: 8 October 2001 (age 25)
- Place of birth: Hong Kong
- Height: 1.70 m (5 ft 7 in)
- Position: Midfielder

Team information
- Current team: Lee Man
- Number: 14

Youth career
- 2013–2018: CFCSSHK

Senior career*
Years	Team	Apps	(Gls)
2018–2019	CFCSSHK	8	(2)
2020–2021	Happy Valley	1	(0)
2021–2023	Rangers (HKG)	13	(3)
2023–2024	Eastern	23	(1)
2025	Shijiazhuang Gongfu	17	(0)
2026	Eastern	2	(0)
2026–	Lee Man	8	(0)

International career^{‡}
2018	Hong Kong U17	3	(0)
2019	Hong Kong U18	2	(0)
2019	Hong Kong U19	3	(2)
2023	Hong Kong U22	2	(0)
2021–2023	Hong Kong U23	12	(0)
2022–	Hong Kong	19	(2)
- * Club domestic league appearances and goals as of 20 November 2026 ‡ National team caps and goals as of 13 November 2025

Jesse Yu Joy Yin (Chinese: 余在言; pinyin: Yú Zàiyán; Jyutping: Jyu4 Zoi6jin4; born 8 October 2001) is a Hong Kong professional footballer who currently plays as a midfielder for Hong Kong Premier League club Lee Man and the Hong Kong national team.

== Club career ==
In August 2021, Yu joined Rangers. He left the club upon the expiry of his contract on 31 May 2023.

On 10 June 2023, Yu joined Eastern.

On 16 January 2025, Yu joined China League One club Shijiazhuang Gongfu.

On 3 February 2026, Yu rejoined Eastern.

On 8 July 2026, Yu joined Lee Man.

== International career ==
On 14 June 2022, Yu made his international debut for Hong Kong in the Asian Cup qualifiers against India.

On 26 December 2023, Yu was named in Hong Kong's squad for the 2023 AFC Asian Cup.

On 7 September 2025, Yu scored his first international goals against Fiji.

== Career statistics ==
=== International ===
As of matches played 13 November 2025

National team	Year	Apps	Goals
Hong Kong	2022	2	0
Hong Kong	2023	0	0
Hong Kong	2024	11	0
Hong Kong	2025	6	2
Total		19	2

#	Date	Venue	Opponent	Result	Competition
2022
1	14 June 2022	Salt Lake Stadium, Kolkata, India	India	0–4	2023 AFC Asian Cup qualification – third round
2	24 July 2022	Toyota Stadium, Toyota, Japan	South Korea	0–3	2022 EAFF E-1 Football Championship
2024
3	14 January 2024	Khalifa International Stadium, Al Rayyan, Qatar	United Arab Emirates	1–3	2023 AFC Asian Cup
4	21 March 2024	Mong Kok Stadium, Mong Kok, Hong Kong	Uzbekistan	0–2	2026 FIFA World Cup qualification – AFC second round

=== International goals ===
No.	Date	Cap	Venue	Opponent	Score	Result	Competition
1.	7 September 2025	17	Kanchanaburi Province Stadium, Kanchanaburi, Thailand	Fiji	1–0	8–0	2025 King's Cup
2.	7 September 2025	17	Kanchanaburi Province Stadium, Kanchanaburi, Thailand	Fiji	4–0	8–0	2025 King's Cup

== Honour ==
Eastern

- Hong Kong FA Cup: 2023–24
- Hong Kong Senior Shield: 2024–25
