= Ng Yu Hei =

Hong Kong footballer (born 2006)

Ng Yu Hei 吳宇曦
Personal information
- Full name: Ng Yu Hei
- Date of birth: 13 February 2006 (age 20)
- Place of birth: Hong Kong
- Height: 1.77 m (5 ft 10 in)
- Positions: Left winger; right winger

Team information
- Current team: Chongqing Tonglianglong
- Number: 17

Youth career
- 2019-2020: South China
- 2020–2023: Eastern

Senior career*
Years	Team	Apps	(Gls)
2023–2025	Eastern	16	(4)
2025–	Chongqing Tonglianglong	26	(0)

International career^{‡}
2026–	Hong Kong U-23	6	(0)
2024–	Hong Kong	10	(1)
Medal record
Men's football
Representing Hong Kong
FIFA ASEAN Challenge Cup
Winner	2026 Hong Kong
- * Club domestic league appearances and goals as of 8 November 2026 ‡ National team caps and goals as of 30 September 2026

Ng Yu Hei (Chinese: 吳宇曦; born 13 February 2006) is a Hong Kong professional footballer who currently plays as a left winger or right winger for Chinese Super League club Chongqing Tonglianglong and the Hong Kong national team.

== Club career ==
On 20 September 2023, Ng joined Eastern.

On 19 January 2025, Ng moved to China and signed for China League One club Chongqing Tonglianglong.

== International career ==
On 26 August 2024, Ng was named in the 23-man final squad for two friendly matches against the Solomon Islands and Fiji. On 5 September 2024, he made his international debut for Hong Kong in a friendly match against the former opponent.

On 5 June 2026, Ng scored his first international goal for Hong Kong through a free kick in the 81st minute to seal a 2–0 victory against Mongolia in a friendly match. The match was Roberto Losada's first as the permanent head coach of Hong Kong. Notably, Losada was also Ng's first head coach in professional football when the midfielder broke into the first team of Eastern.

== Career statistics ==
=== Club ===
As of matches played 1 November 2025

Club	Season	League			National Cup		League Cup		Continental		Other		Total	
Club	Season	Division	Apps	Goals	Apps	Goals	Apps	Goals	Apps	Goals	Apps	Goals	Apps	Goals
Eastern	2023–24	Hong Kong Premier League	9	3	2	0	8	1	—		1	0	20	4
Eastern	2024–25	Hong Kong Premier League	7	1	—		—		5	1	1	0	13	1
Eastern Total			16	4	2	0	8	1	5	1	2	0	33	5
Chongqing Tonglianglong	2025	China League One	9	0	1	0	—		—		—		10	0
Career total			25	4	3	0	8	1	5	1	2	0	43	5

=== International ===
As of matches played 30 September 2026

National team	Year	Apps	Goals
Hong Kong	2024	4	0
Hong Kong	2025	2	0
Hong Kong	2026	4	1
Total		10	1

#	Date	Venue	Opponent	Result	Competition
2024
1	5 September	HFC Bank Stadium, Suva, Fiji	Solomon Islands	3–0	Friendly
2	10 October	Rheinpark Stadion, Vaduz, Liechtenstein	Liechtenstein	0–1	Friendly
3	19 November	Mong Kok Stadium, Mong Kok, Hong Kong	Mauritius	1–0	Friendly
4	17 December	Hong Kong Stadium, So Kon Po, Hong Kong	Guam	5–0	Qualification round deciders
2025
5	5 June	Hong Kong Stadium, So Kon Po, Hong Kong	Nepal	0–0	Friendly
6	10 June	Kai Tak Sports Park, Kai Tak, Hong Kong	India	1–0	AFC Asian Cup qualification

=== International goals ===
Scores and results list Hong Kong's goal tally first.

No.	Date	Venue	Opponent	Score	Result	Competition
1.	5 June 2026	Hong Kong Stadium, So Kon Po, Hong Kong	Mongolia	2–0	2–0	Friendly

== Honour ==
Eastern

- Hong Kong FA Cup: 2023–24
- Hong Kong Senior Shield: 2024–25

Hong Kong

- FIFA ASEAN Challenge Cup: 2026
