= Hong Kong v Inter Miami =

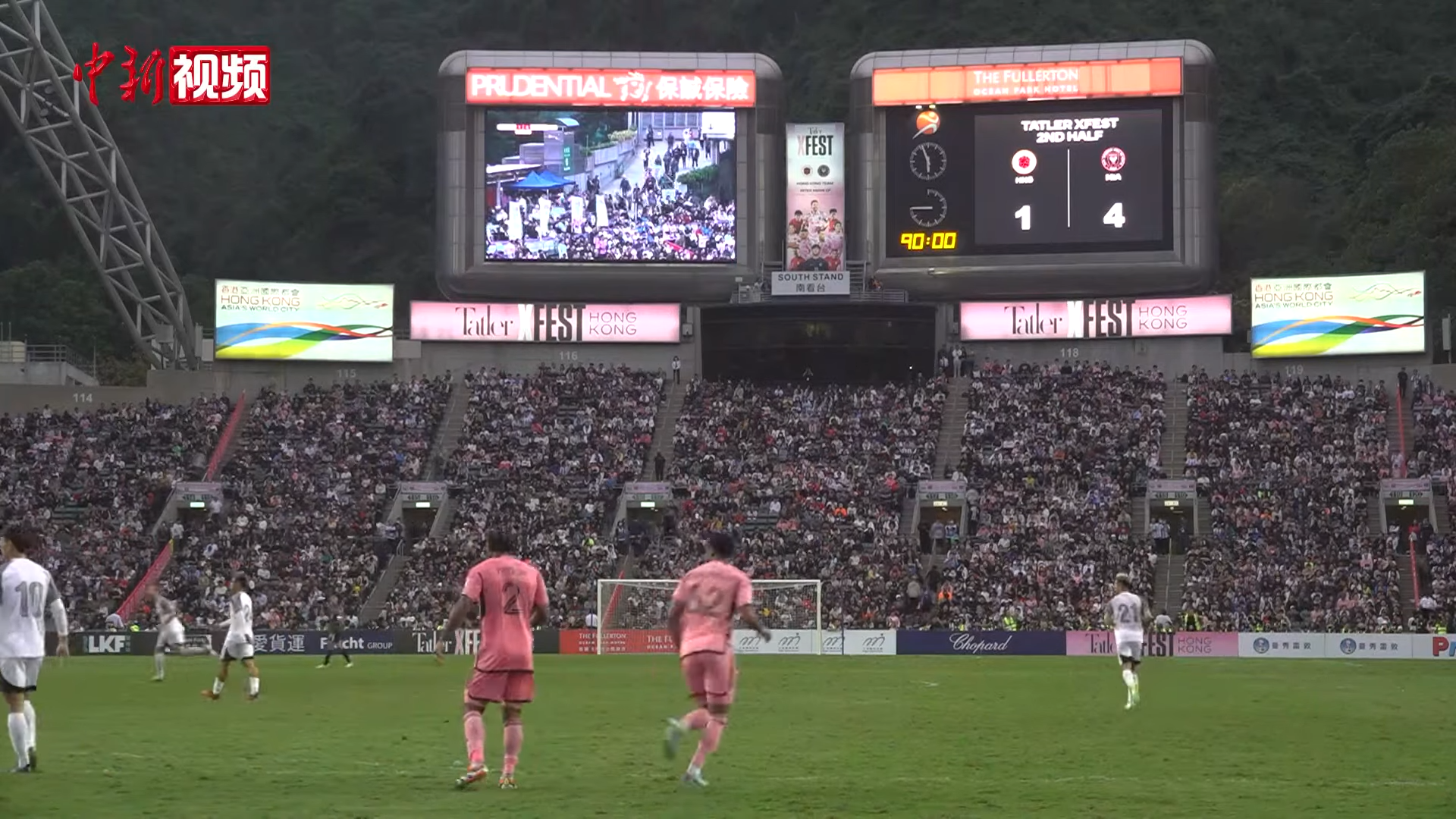
- The match ended with 4–1 victory for Inter Miami.
- Event: Tatler XFEST friendly match
Hong Kong	Inter Miami CF
1	4
- Date: 4 February 2024
- Venue: Hong Kong Stadium, So Kon Po, Hong Kong Island
- Attendance: 38,417

Tatler XFEST Hong Kong, Hong Kong Team vs Inter Miami CF was a friendly football match between Hong Kong League XI and Inter Miami CF held in Hong Kong Stadium on 4 February 2024. Inter Miami won the match 4–1, but the no-show of Lionel Messi, Inter Miami's star player, greatly disappointed some ticket buyers and members of the government. The costly and highly publicized match, meant to boost Hong Kong's reputation for hosting major events, became a controversy known as the Messi Mess or Messi's Mess (Chinese: 美斯之亂; lit. 'The Messi Controversy').

Organizer Tatler Asia, a culture and society magazine with no experience in sports events, had been misleading during and after the match about Messi's expected participation and its knowledge of this, and ultimately agreed to a half-refund of the record-setting ticket prices. Messi and Inter Miami stated that he did not participate due to a medical assessment, while certain commentators, state-controlled media and Chinese government officials accused Messi of anti-China sentiment.

== Background ==
Despite the Hong Kong government having revoked all pandemic restrictions in early 2023, it had not attracted visits from many top-tier celebrities. The imposition of national security law in 2020, the slowing growth of the Chinese economy, and speculations over the slump in the Hong Kong stock market were said to have diminished the attractiveness of Hong Kong. The government therefore decided to boost the economy through world-class events, in order to promote Hong Kong and stimulate spending by the public.

=== Announcement ===
According to an interview with Pui Kwan-kay, President of the Football Association of Hong Kong, China (HKFA), a friendly match had been planned for Inter Miami in Shanghai, to take place in November 2023, but was cancelled due to delays with permits. Since the organising Shanghai sports corporation had paid the deposit and the team had travel plans, intermediaries approached Pui expressing their desire for Hong Kong to take over the match. The rumoured appearance fee was US$10 million, and Shanghai had paid US$3 million. However, Pui said he unequivocally rejected the offer for the "astronomical" and "unrealistic" price. According to Pui, the match was later made possible by the Hong Kong Government, and was scheduled in 2024.

Seen as one of Hong Kong's first major post-pandemic events, Inter Miami announced in December 2023 that it would travel to Asia in February for the club's first international tour, and the team would play a match in Hong Kong on 4 February, taking on the Hong Kong Team. The tour would be organised by Tatler Asia, a culture and society magazine catering to the wealthy elite which had no prior experience in hosting sports events. Both Argentine superstar Lionel Messi, who previously visited Hong Kong in 2014 and won the World Cup in 2022, and Uruguay footballer Luis Suárez were reported to be joining the tour.

Tatler Asia and Hong Kong officials promoted the event as the "world's top-level football match" and the most prominent sports event of the year in Hong Kong. Chinese and southeast Asian tourists were expected to attend, which would demonstrate the city's capability as the "events capital of Asia". Hong Kong Secretary for Culture, Sports and Tourism Kevin Yeung said that the government had provided a matching grant of $16 million through the M Mark event subsidy scheme and approved a range of support measures for Tatler Asia, including a venue-hiring grant.

=== Ticket sales ===
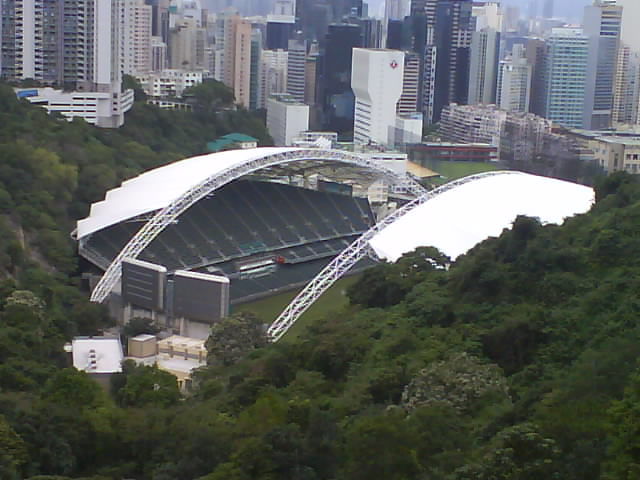
Hong Kong Stadium, the hosting venue

Tickets for the match were offered for sale in January 2024, priced at $800 to $4,800, setting a record as the city's most expensive football tickets. Nonetheless, with heavy promotion, more than 2 million fans tried to buy the tickets online, and all tickets were sold within an hour. However, Tatler Asia were reluctant regarding Messi's participation, claiming that there was no deal in place and that it would ultimately be the coach's decision as to who plays. This was disputed by a senior government source who said that there were "contract terms specifying that Messi would play in the match, save for illness or injury".

=== Prior matches ===
Inter Miami played against Saudi Al Hilal on 29 January and Al Nassr on 1 February. Messi was substituted 87 minutes into the game against Al Hilal, and reportedly felt unwell afterwards; he resumed training on 31 January. Due to requests under contract terms, Messi played for 7 minutes as a substitution in the match against Al Nassr in spite of his club's advice to rest for a few days. This raised concern of his possible injury.

== Arrival and training ==
=== Arrival ===
After finishing the match in Saudi Arabia, Inter Miami's delayed flight arrived at Hong Kong International Airport at half past two in the afternoon local time on 2 February, pushing the welcome ceremony back an hour. Manager Gerardo Martino and the squad, including Messi and Suárez, deplaned and took part in a photo session at the airport apron. Then, apparently exhausted in the heat, they boarded a bus without answering reporters' questions, despite requests to stay by the master of ceremonies. Around ten minutes later, Hong Kong officials including sports commissioner Sam Wong, along with Inter Miami owner Jorge Mas and Tatler Asia CEO Michel Lamunière, arrived and took pictures with a group of children who had hoped to meet the footballers. The team meanwhile stayed on the bus, and left the airport a few minutes later.

In a press conference later that afternoon, Martino said Messi had felt a twinge in his hamstring and underwent an MRI earlier that week to assess the problem. They would wait until the day of the game to decide if Messi could play. Martino asserted that the aspiration was that Messi would play as many minutes as possible, but he would most certainly be on the pitch.

=== Open training ===
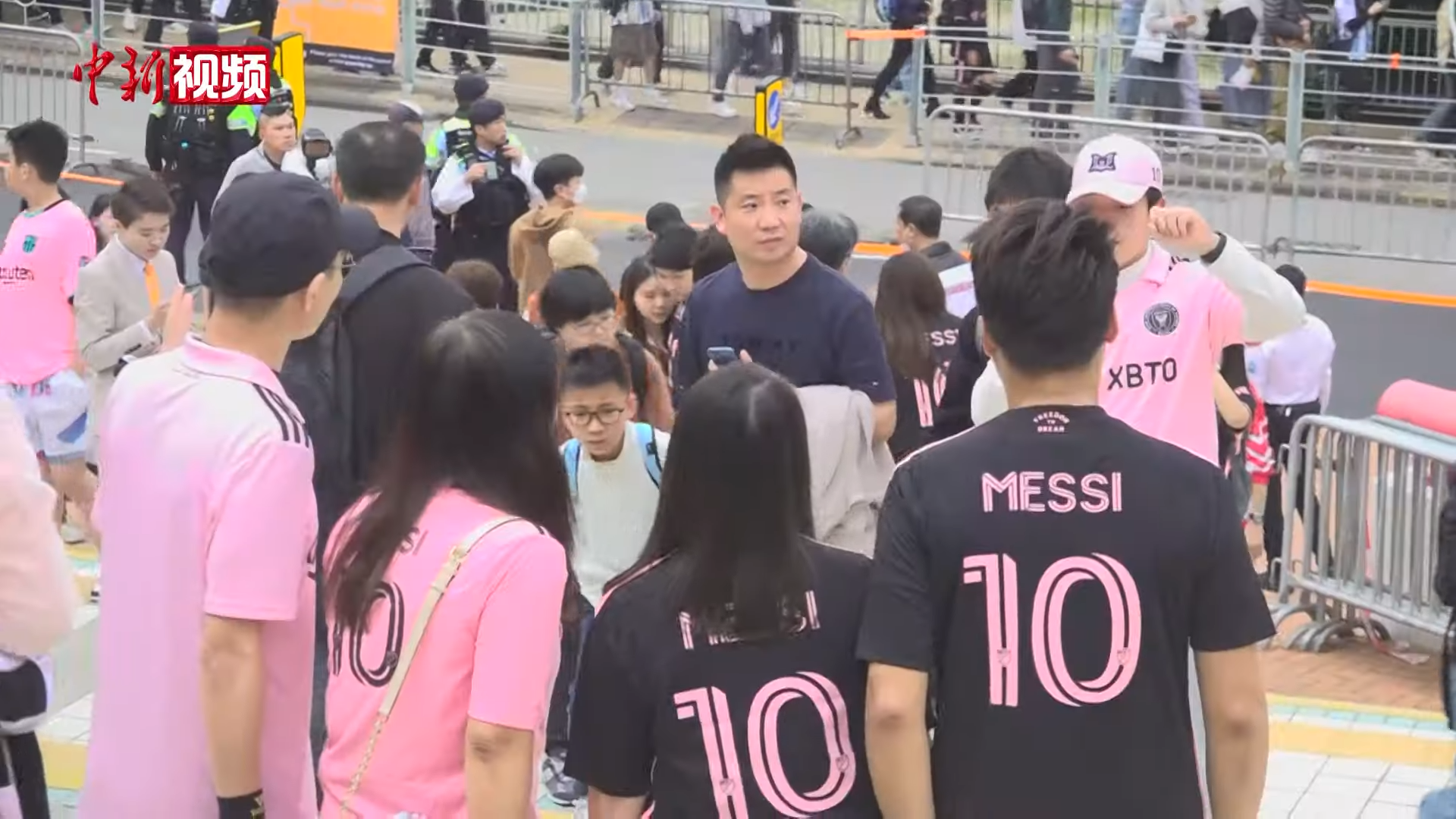
Fans wear Messi jerseys as Messi enthusiasm spreads in Hong Kong.

Messi and his Inter Miami teammates took part in an open training session later that day, joined by a record 39,916 spectators, with ticket prices between HK$580 and HK$780. Around 15,000 free tickets were distributed by the government, Laureus Sport for Good, and HKFA to grassroot community organizations, students, youth and para-athletes. Greeted by the large crowd, Messi emerged 15 minutes after his teammates and waved at the fans. However, Messi and Suárez did not participate in as much practice as their teammates, Messi performing back stretches instead.

David Beckham, the club's co-owner who arrived earlier than the team, also appeared and thanked those present for the "special welcome". He was stopped for a selfie by one of several pitch invaders, who brought the event to an early conclusion, with Miami players staying only 40 minutes of the 90 scheduled.

The club also took part in a coaching clinic for 80 local children, where Messi and Beckham were seen playing with the kids.

=== Private events ===
Tatler Asia arranged a 30-minute meet-and-greet session and an autograph session with Inter Miami players, priced at HK$120,000 and HK$150,000 respectively.

Messi, Jordi Alba, and Sergio Busquets from Inter Miami, paralympic medalist So Wa-wai, Special Olympics football player Lee Ho-yung, and disability activist Mok Kim-wing met with two severely ill children from Make-A-Wish Hong Kong, and signed autographs.

== Match ==
=== Pre-game ===
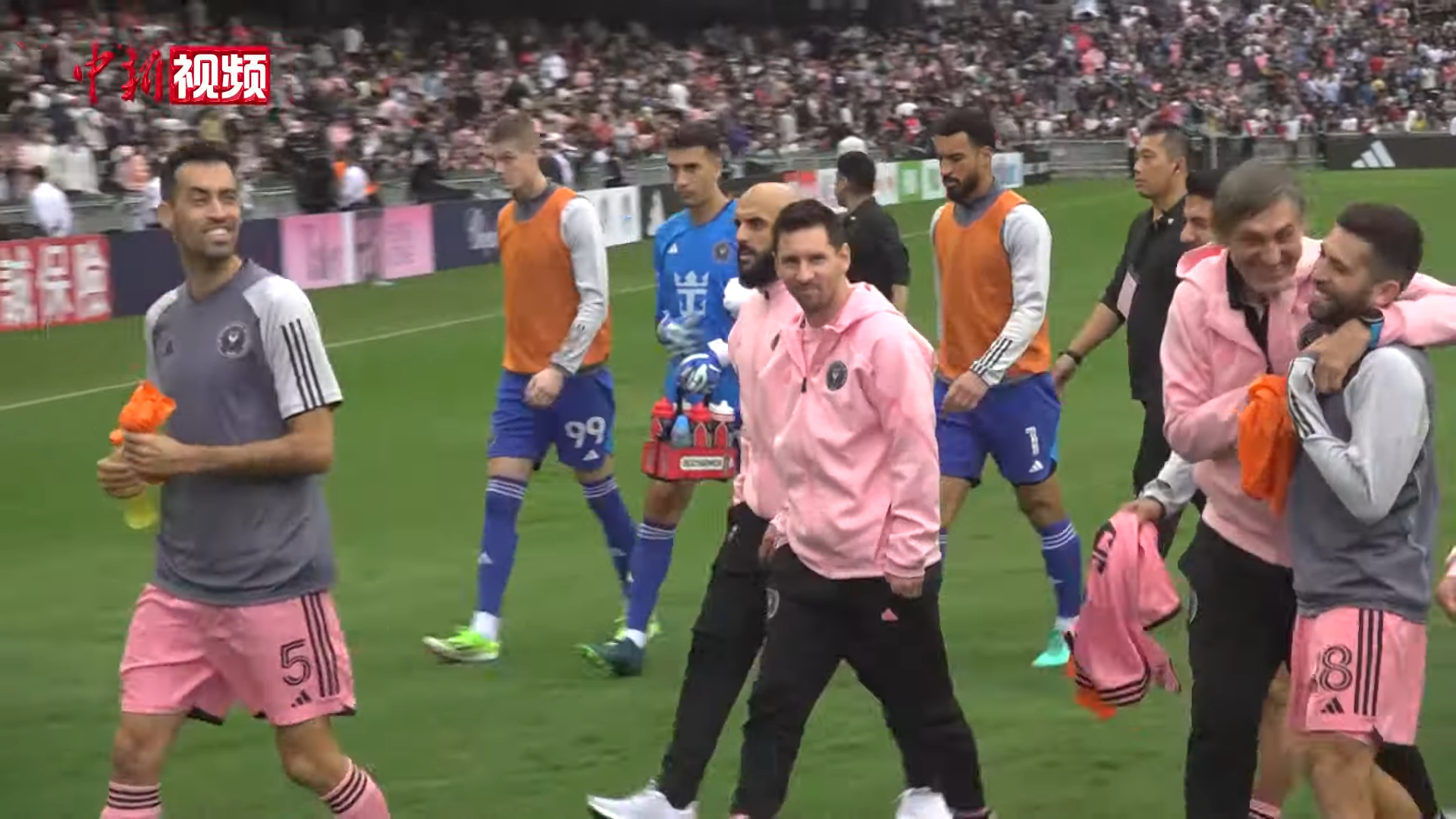
Messi before match begins

At 12.30 p.m., three and a half hours before the scheduled start of 4 p.m., Hong Kong Stadium was opened to spectators. Attendance was recorded at 38,417, while some media outlets reported the figure to be 38,323.

Players from both teams entered the stadium at around 3 p.m. for warm-up, though Messi and Suárez were both absent. Government ministers, including Yeung and Financial Secretary Paul Chan, along with tycoons and celebrities were present. Hong Kong Chief Executive John Lee was seen chatting with Beckham, as were actor Tony Leung and his actress wife Carina Lau who took photos with the club's owner. Anson Lo and Keung To from local boy group MIRROR performed three songs as pre-game entertainment.

The line-up was announced at 3:55 p.m., with Messi and Suárez appearing and seating themselves at the substitutes benches. In an Inter Miami social media post, Messi was not included on the line-up, while Suárez was listed as a substitute. The HKFA's website and the team sheet signed by club staff and submitted to match officials, however, showed Messi listed on the team sheet as a substitute.

=== Match details ===
The match began at 4:07 p.m.. In the 40th minute Taylor feinted to his left from the corner of the box and fired a curling strike past the goalkeeper to open the scoring for Inter Miami. Three minutes later Hong Kong responded with a goal by Anier, equalizing the score at halftime. In the second half, Sunderland latched onto a square pass from the defender and reclaimed the lead at 50 minutes, followed by Campana receiving a pass in the box from Sunderland and scoring six minutes later. In the 62nd minute former Barcelona players Alba and Busquets joined the playing field. The final goal was scored in the 85th minute when Sailor flicked a header into the net, concluding the match with a 1–4 result.

Tatler XFEST friendly match
4 February 2024
16:00 HKT (UTC+8)

Hong Kong League XI	1–4	Inter Miami CF
Anier 43'	Report	Taylor 40'; Sunderland 50'; Campana 56'; Sailor 85'

Hong Kong Stadium, Hong Kong
Attendance: 38,417

Hong Kong League XI	Inter Miami

GK	1	(Hong Kong) Yapp Hung-fai (c)	(substituted off) HT'
DF	3	(Hong Kong) Li Ngai-hoi	(substituted off) 68'
DF	26	(Hong Kong) Oliver Gerbig	(substituted off) HT'
DF	15	(Spain) José Ángel	(substituted off) HT'
DF	22	(Hong Kong) Timothy Chow	(substituted off) HT'
MF	7	(Turkmenistan) Ruslan Mingazow	(substituted off) HT'
MF	27	(Spain) Marcos Gondra	(substituted off) HT'
MF	16	(Hong Kong) Chan Siu Kwan	(substituted off) HT'
MF	17	(Brazil) Mikael	(substituted off) HT'
FW	8	(Hong Kong) Everton Camargo	(substituted off) HT'
FW	9	(Estonia) Henri Anier	(substituted off) HT'
Substitutes:
GK	18	(Hong Kong) Pong Cheuk Hei	(substituted on) 84'
GK	19	(Hong Kong) Tse Ka Wing	(substituted on) HT' (substituted off) 84'
DF	2	(Scotland) Calum Hall	(substituted on) HT'
MF	4	(England) Charlie Scott	(substituted on) HT'
DF	5	(Spain) Daniel Almazan	(substituted on) HT'
MF	11	(Brazil) Cleiton	(substituted on) HT'
MF	12	(Netherlands) Mitchel Paulissen	(substituted on) HT'
MF	24	(Hong Kong) Ngan Cheuk-pan	(substituted on) 68'
FW	10	(Hong Kong) Lam Lok-hei	(substituted on) 84'
FW	13	(Brazil) Gil	(substituted on) HT' (substituted off) 84'
FW	14	(Austria) Jakob Jantscher	(substituted on) HT'
FW	20	(Ghana) Nassam Ibrahim	(substituted on) HT' (substituted off) 84'
FW	21	(Hong Kong) Jordan Lam	(substituted on) HT'
FW	23	(Hong Kong) Mahama Awal	(substituted on) 84'
Manager:
(Norway) Jørn Andersen

GK	13	(United States) CJ dos Santos
DF	2	(United States) DeAndre Yedlin
DF	24	(United States) Julian Gressel	(substituted off) 80'
DF	6	(Argentina) Tomás Avilés	(substituted off) 88'
DF	27	(Ukraine) Sergiy Kryvtsov	(substituted off) 31'
DF	32	(Greece) Noah Allen	(substituted off) 62'
MF	16	(Finland) Robert Taylor
MF	26	(Brazil) Gregore (c)
MF	41	(Honduras) David Ruiz	(substituted off) 62'
MF	43	(United States) Lawson Sunderland	(substituted off) 80'
FW	8	(Ecuador) Leonardo Campana	(substituted off) 80'
Substitutes:
GK	1	(United States) Drake Callender
GK	99	(United States) Cole Jensen
DF	18	(Spain) Jordi Alba	(substituted on) 62'
DF	15	(United States) Ryan Sailor	(substituted on) 31'
DF	5	(Spain) Sergio Busquets	(substituted on) 62'
DF	55	(United States) Tyler Hall	(substituted on) 88'
DF	62	(Dominican Republic) Israel Boatwright	(substituted on) 80'
MF	42	(Italy) Yannick Bright	(substituted on) 80'
FW	10	(Argentina) Lionel Messi (Note: Not included on the list provided by Inter Miami)
FW	9	(Uruguay) Luis Suárez
FW	49	(Haiti) Shanyder Borgelin	(substituted on) 80'
Manager:
(Argentina) Gerardo Martino

=== Messi, Suárez benched ===
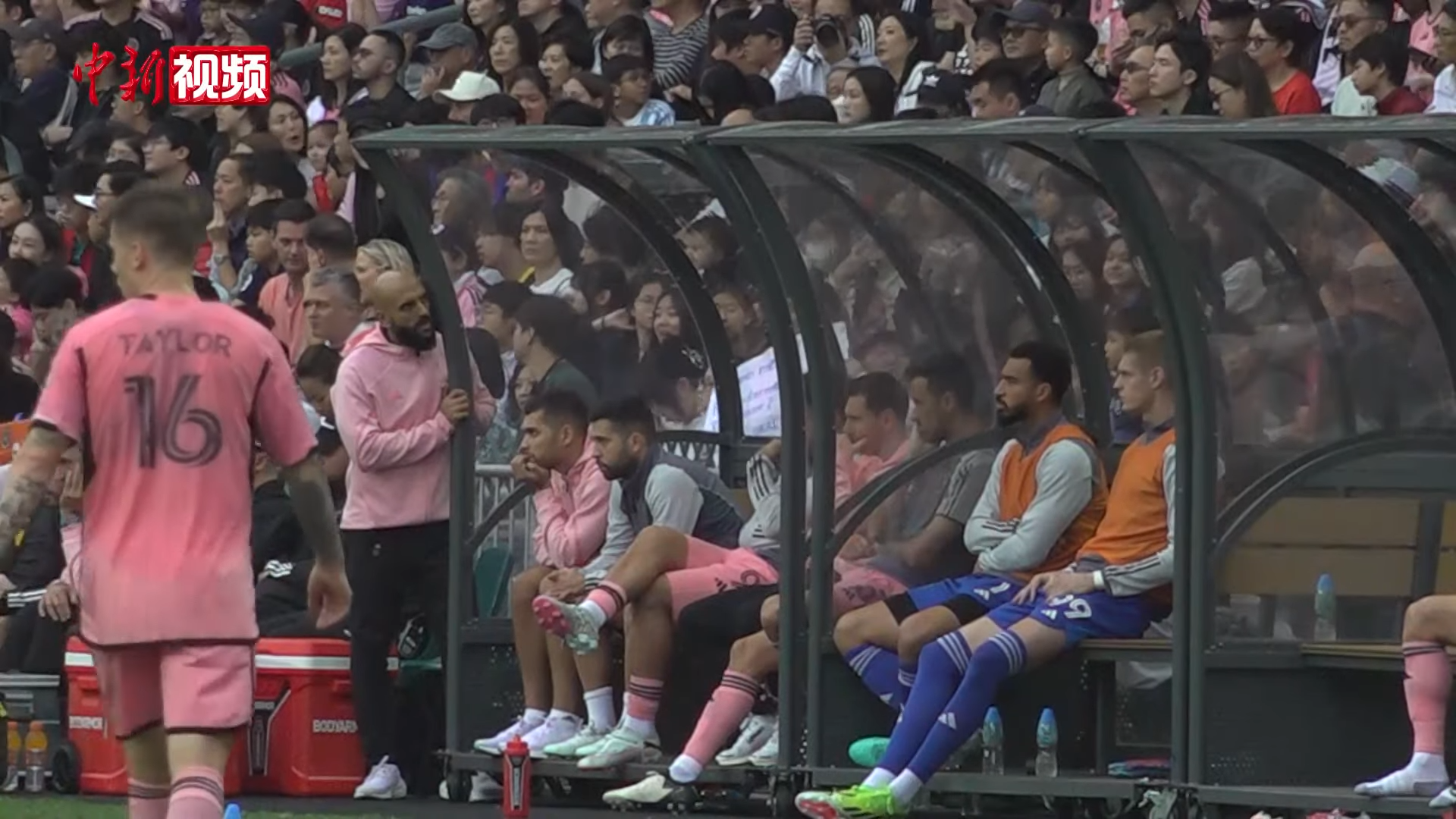
Messi and other players on the bench

As many fans had purchased tickets solely to see the superstar playing, chants of "Messi" could be heard throughout the match. But as it became clear that Messi would not be playing, the boos and chants of "refund" (回水; Cantonese Yale: wùih shúi, Jyutping: wui4 seui2; lit. 'return money') in Cantonese became louder during the last ten minutes, during which some spectators left. The jeers rose to a crescendo at the final whistle. Suarez had failed to take to the pitch because of a knee injury, while Messi, wearing trousers, was reported to have entered the dressing room during halftime.

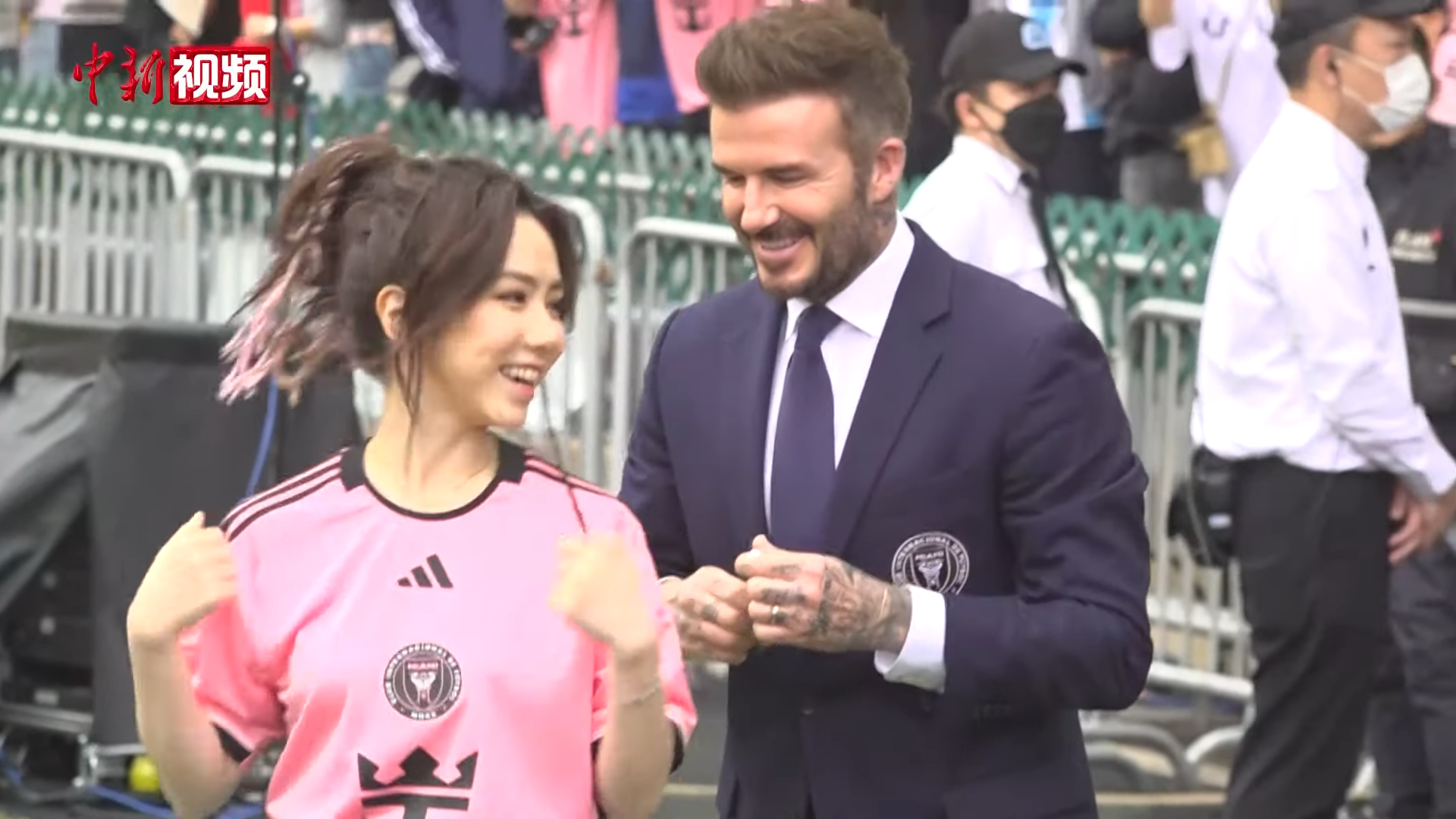
G.E.M. and Beckham after match

A trophy was presented to the visiting team, whilst boos and jeers continued to greet the players. Messi stood at the back for team photos and went straight to the dressing room afterwards. Beckham thanked Hongkongers for their "incredible welcome", and "look forward to coming back one day to entertain you even more". His speech was drowned by boos despite the announcer's urge for respect. When he walked around to thank the fans, he signed an autograph for a fan who invaded the pitch and took a selfie. The event was brought to a close by local pop star G.E.M. with hymn "Amazing Grace" and a Spanish version of her song "Gloria", but that did not calm all the frustrations. Some fans redirected their anger at the advertising around the stadium, with Messi's head torn from one display.

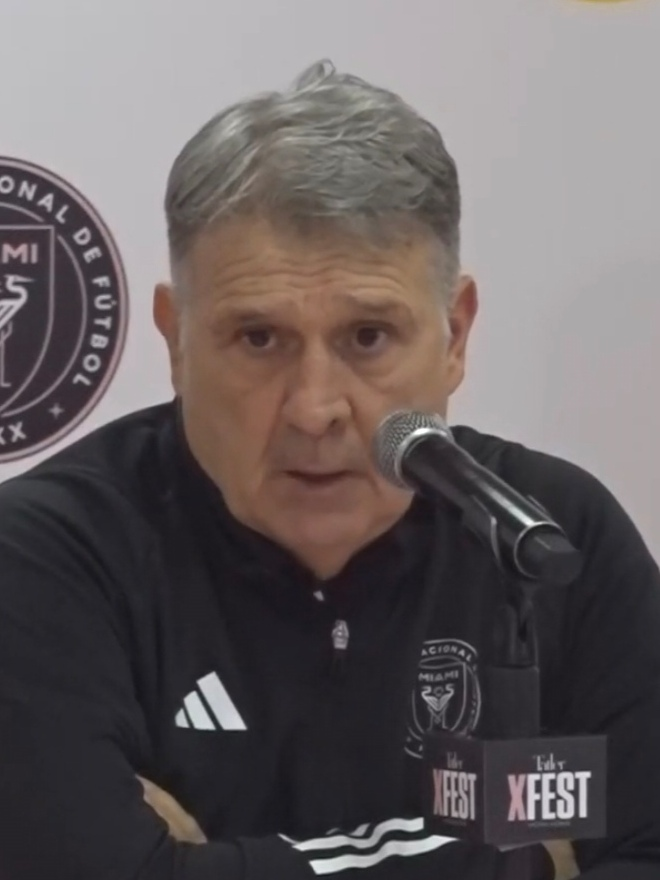
Gerardo Martino at press conference

Martino attended the press conference after the match and was apologetic. He thanked Hongkongers for their openness and said that the team had been treated very well. He defended the decision to not send Messi and Suárez as there was no chance they could play. "We understand fans are very disappointed and we ask for their forgiveness. We wish we could have sent them on the pitch for a while to play, but the risk was too big." He added that Messi had muscle inflammation and Suárez had a swollen knee from the previous match in Saudi Arabia. Martino stressed it had been the decision of the medical team made in the morning after checking their physical situation, and they also had to consider their obligations with the upcoming 2024 Major League Soccer season.

=== Reaction ===
The Hong Kong Government issued a statement at 8:06 p.m., HKT about an hour and a half after the match ended.

Regarding Messi not playing the match today, the Government, as well as all football fans, are extremely disappointed about the organiser's arrangement. The organiser owes all football fans an explanation.

It also said that the match had been awarded M Mark status, a matching grant of HK$15 million, and a grant for venue of HK$1 million by the Major Sports Events Committee (MSEC). It stated that MSEC would take actions with Tatler Asia including "reducing the amount of funding as a result of Messi not playing the match". This was followed a few hours later by another statement criticising the organiser of failing to promptly provide a detailed explanation and Messi for not explaining his absence, and stated that "the way that the organiser and Inter Miami CF handled the situation could not meet the expectations of the fans who showed strong support to Messi, especially those visitors who came all the way here for the match."

Later that day, Tatler Asia released a statement which expressed "extreme disappointment" over Messi's absence but clarified that "despite some news reports, Tatler did not have any information about the non-participation". The hotel where Inter Miami stayed was cordoned off by the police as a precaution.

== Departure and Japan trip ==
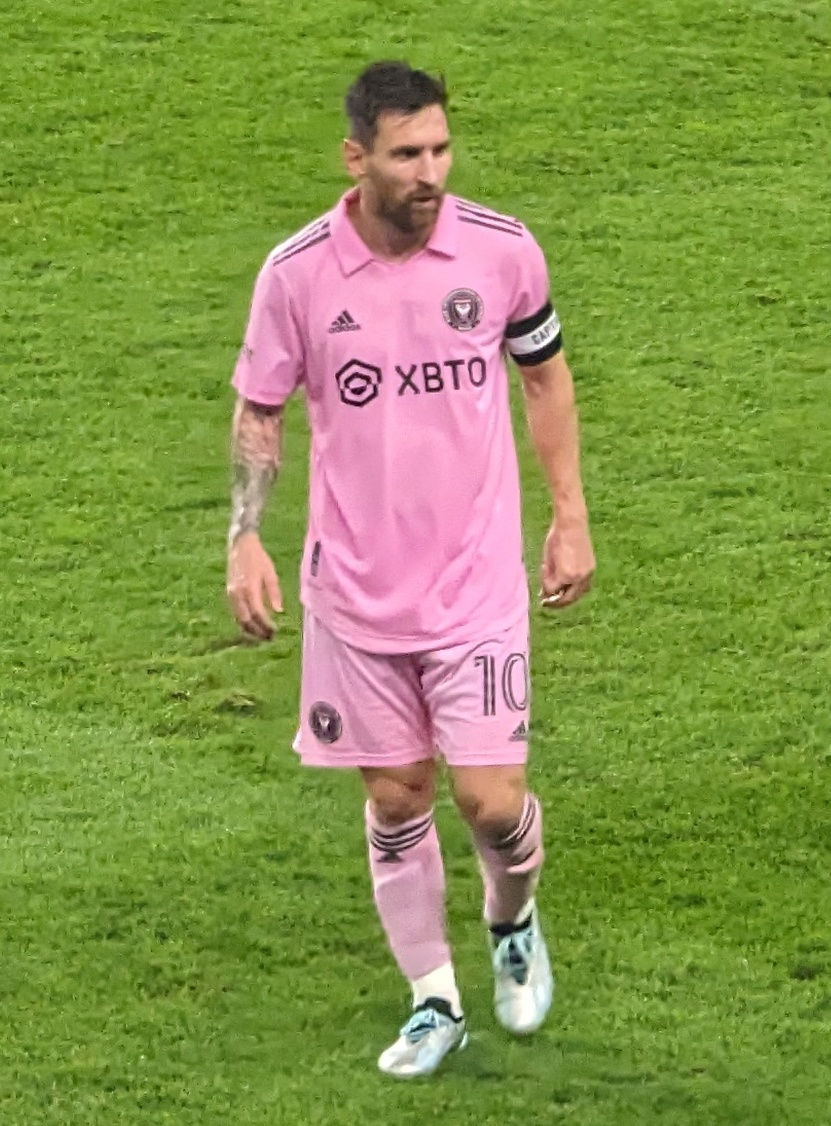
Lionel Messi playing for Inter Miami in 2023

Speculations grew on whether the final overseas leg of Inter Miami's tour would continue after a scheduled match against Japanese club Vissel Kobe was removed from Apple TV's schedule. Major League Soccer later clarified that the removal was due to logistical difficulties. Inter Miami concluded its visit to Hong Kong on 5 February, leaving in the afternoon after a planned appearance at Kai Tak Sports Park was cancelled. They arrived in Tokyo later that day. Messi was seen more amiable than in Hong Kong.

Messi said in a press conference that "muscle discomfort" had made it difficult for him to play and he hoped to return to Hong Kong "whenever he can". He added he felt "much better" in Japan compared to the past days.

...results showed that I had swelling in the adductor, but there was no injury. ... But the truth is that the discomfort ... made it very difficult for me to play. Unfortunately, it is something that happens in football ... It happened to me and I couldn't be in the game in Hong Kong and it's a shame because I always want to participate

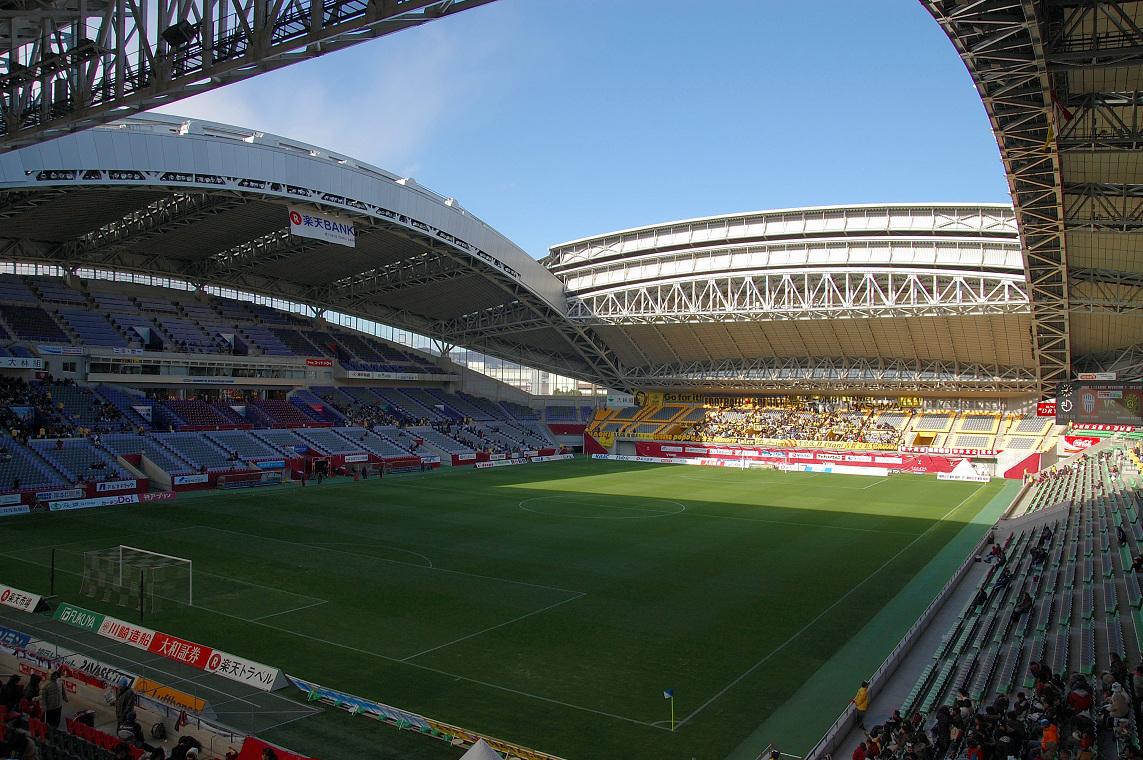
Noevir Stadium, the home of Vissel Kobe

Messi joined the open training in Kobe the next day. The match went on as planned at night on 7 February. Suárez was at the starting lineup. Messi came on in the 60th minute and played for over 30 minutes, with his every touch being loudly applauded during his half-hour of play. Vissel Kobe won 4–3 in a penalty shoot-out.

Messi posted on Weibo later that night in Chinese and Spanish.

Hello to all my fans in mainland China and Hong Kong! As I said in the press conference, it was a real shame not to be able to play in Hong Kong the other day due to a groin injury that had swollen and I was in pain. Anyone who knows me knows that I always want to play, that's what I always want, to do my best in any game. And especially in these games when we travel so far and fans are excited to see us attend the game healthily. Hopefully we can come back and play a game in Hong Kong. And I also hope to return to China as soon as possible and greet you all.

== Government role ==
=== Contract requirements ===
Timeline of knowledge regarding Messi's absence
Time		Events
11 Jan		Tatler Asia: line-up to be decided by Miami coach
2 Feb		Inter Miami: would decide on game day
4 Feb	Before match	Team Sheet: Messi listed as substitute
4 Feb	Before match	Yeung: told by Tatler that Messi would play in second half
4 Feb	3:45 pm	Tatler Asia was told Messi likely to stay on bench
4 Feb	4:05 pm	Inter Miami: Messi confirmed not listed as substitute
4 Feb	4:07 pm	Match begins
4 Feb	5:00 pm	Tatler Asia: was told Messi to stay on bench
4 Feb	5:50 pm	Yeung: Tatler Asia said Messi to stay on bench
4 Feb	6:00 pm	Match ends
4 Feb	After match	Tatler Asia: stated they had no information on Messi's absence
15 Feb		Tatler admits it knew before game that Messi would not play
Events not revealed publicly at the time are in italics.

Confirming earlier media sources, Yeung on 5 February said Tatler Asia's contract with the government required Messi to play for at least 45 minutes, unless he was ill or injured, and the organiser had told the government before the match that Messi would play in the second half of the game. Some sources added Messi was required to receive the trophy and speak to fans as captain. However, just 10 minutes before the game ended, Tatler Asia confirmed Messi would stay on the bench. Officials then immediately requested them to explore other remedies, such as Messi appearing on the field to interact with his fans and receive the trophy. Yeung added that officials had no direct contact with Inter Miami, and had no idea of the severity of Messi's injuries or the decision to leave him on the bench.

The government is said to have invited Messi to tour the Victoria Harbour and Kai Tak Sports Park for HK$1 million in order to promote Hong Kong, but was rejected by Inter Miami well before the match. Kenneth Fok, the MP for the sports constituency, issued a statement condemning Tatler and Inter Miami, believing that both of them are responsible. He demanded they issue an apology to the fans, particularly as the team had received high remuneration.

In a press conference on the same day, Tatler Asia chair Michel Lamunière said the contract agreement included clauses requiring Messi and Suarez to play in the match unless they were injured, and both were included in the official team sheet signed by Martino before the match which "showed Lionel Messi and Luis Suarez as substitutes and therefore fit to play". He said the club informed Tatler at half-time that Messi would be unable to play due to an injury, and that the company immediately informed the government and urged Inter Miami to "instruct Messi to address the fans, to no avail". While early speculation claims the contract only committed "famous players" without naming Messi or Suárez, Tatler Asia said "Inter Miami had committed under contract that all of their marquee players – Messi, Alba, Busquets and Suárez – would be required to play for 45 minutes unless injured".

HKFA was later criticised after reports emerged that they had agreed to let Tatler Asia sign a "non-compulsory" contract that did not force Messi to play at a lower price, unlike the one signed with Vissel Kobe which had a mandatory requirement for Messi to appear.

Lamunière changed his narrative during an interview with The Athletic on 15 February. Contrary to the statement released a day after the match, he said "he had only discovered Messi would not play 15 minutes before the start of the game", and the rest of the first half "was spent trying to find solutions for Messi to play, talking, and moving around the pitch." Under the contract, Busquets and Alba also had to play a minimum of 45 minutes unless injured, yet the latter two arrived on the hour mark during the second half. Lamunière did not directly respond if this constituted a breach of agreement. He later clarified that he heard "a possible problem and that the [Inter Miami] medical staff were working on Messi in the hope he could still play".

=== M Mark funding ===
Lamunière announced on 5 February the withdrawal of Tatler Asia's application for government funds, and expressed deep regret over the disappointing ending for the fans. In response, Yeung reasserted that giving up government funding had not entirely resolved the matter, and "the organiser should deal with consumers' demands". He said the funds had not yet been given to Tatler Asia. However, he admitted that authorities had not scrutinised the contract between Inter Miami and Talter Asia as "business secrets" do not require government attention.

John Lee said that he had directed the ministry to seriously review the Messi debacle and the M Mark application procedures, including the roles and responsibilities of officials in promoting future large-scale events, such as requirements for contingency plans and timely communications.

Under major sports events application guidelines, vetting procedures for applications of new M Mark events take six months to complete under normal circumstances. However, Beckham negotiated the deal to bring Inter Miami to Hong Kong around the beginning of December, narrowing the vetting period to one and a half months. MSEC chair Wilfred Ng confirmed "there will be special arrangements for large-scale events" as members had favoured the potential boost to Hong Kong's economy and to sports development. Ng added the consideration was also based on the 45-minute playing requirement in the contract and had no knowledge over the communication between Tatler Asia and Inter Miami.

== Refund ==
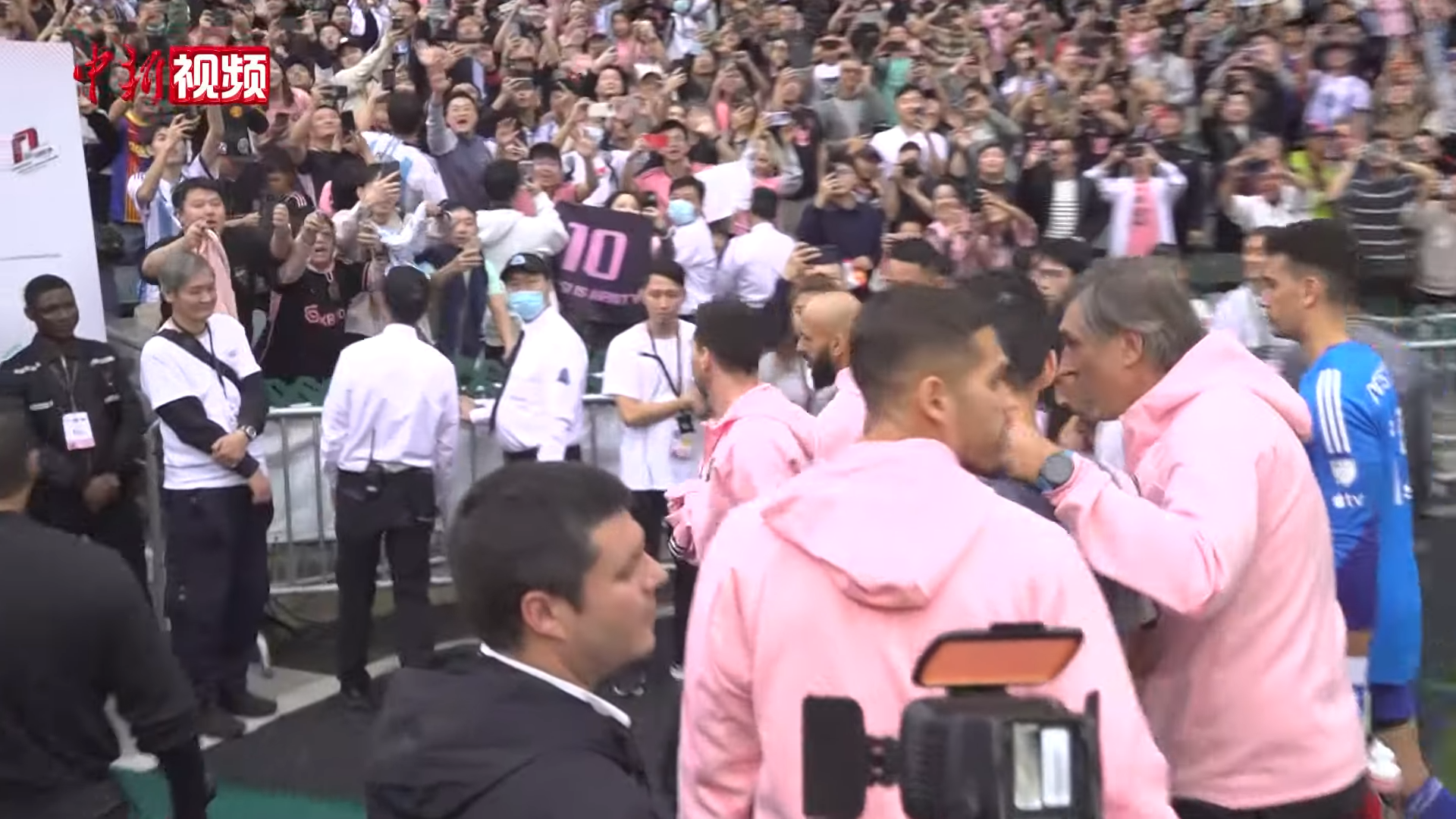
Angry fans protested as Messi returned to dressing room.

Tatler Asia's VIP bundles, priced at HK$150,000, included VIP tickets for the match and meet-and-great session, along with limited merchandise. In addition, various souvenir gifts such as scarves and jackets were sold. The total income of Tatler Asia, covering sponsorships and ticket fees, is believed to surpass HK$132 million, including HK$11 million from the open training session. Under the contract, Tatler Asia had paid Inter Miami HK$50 million for their appearance.

Following a closed-door meeting with authorities, Tatler Asia announced on 9 February a 50% refund to fans who purchased tickets through "official channels". Unaudited figures suggested the refund could cost HK$56 million, resulting in a net loss of HK$43 million. Tatler Asia said they invited the Consumer Council to participate in the talks and will not evade responsibility.

The Consumer Council received at least 1,465 complaints, including 302 from tourists. The average amount of money involved in each case was HK$6,900, with the most expensive case involving $92,000. The Customs department received 360 complaints and created a team to assess the claims. It also said appropriate enforcement action would be taken if violation of the Trade Descriptions Ordinance is discovered.

Refund details were announced by Tatler Asia on 18 March, with email notifications sent to those who purchased tickets through ticketing platform Klook. There was a 12 April deadline for refund requests, which were to be processed before 13 May. The Culture, Sports and Tourism Bureau described it as "a responsible move" displaying a commitment to resolve the matter. Tatler Asia stated that people must agree to drop any further legal complaints or claims before collecting a refund. However, the Consumer Council responded that consumers need not drop their complaints for the refund, though they might need to drop any complaints filed with their banks, and purchases through secondary sources might not qualify for refunds.

== Political response ==
With the government involved in the publicity of the match and support for the organiser, and the widespread international media attention for the 'mega event' as the "Messi Mess", Hong Kong's ability to stand as an "events capital" came under further scrutiny. Pro-Beijing legislator Michael Tien said that the chaos had damaged the city's reputation and former Financial Secretary John Tsang also worried the political fallout could unavoidably harm this reputation. The debacle continued to swell throughout the week, with anti-China allegations and the emergence of conspiracy theories.

In 2017, Messi had sent a signed photograph to 2010 Nobel Peace Prize laureate Liu Xiaobo through Howard Lam, a Hong Kong Democratic Party member. Some interpreted this as support for Liu who had been jailed for subversion. Messi avoided shaking hands with Hong Kong officials and, during the prize presentation, walked past John Lee, who had been sanctioned by the United States for "undermining Hong Kong's Autonomy". Messi stood in the corner while official photos were taken.

The significant contrast between Messi's performance in Hong Kong and Japan, just three days after, sparked attention from Hong Kong media and officials. The Culture, Sports and Tourism Bureau sought a reasonable explanation on this and Tatler Asia described it as "another slap in the face". Some speculated that Messi was not injured and denigrated him as an insincere person who should leave. An editorial on Chinese state-run newspaper Global Times criticised Inter Miami's and Messi's explanation as "not convincing" and urged the team to come up with a "reasonable explanation". It also warned of possible "political motives":

There is a lot of speculation about the true underlying reasons. One theory suggests that there might be political motives behind their actions, as Hong Kong intends to develop its mega-event based economy, and external forces deliberately seek to embarrass Hong Kong.

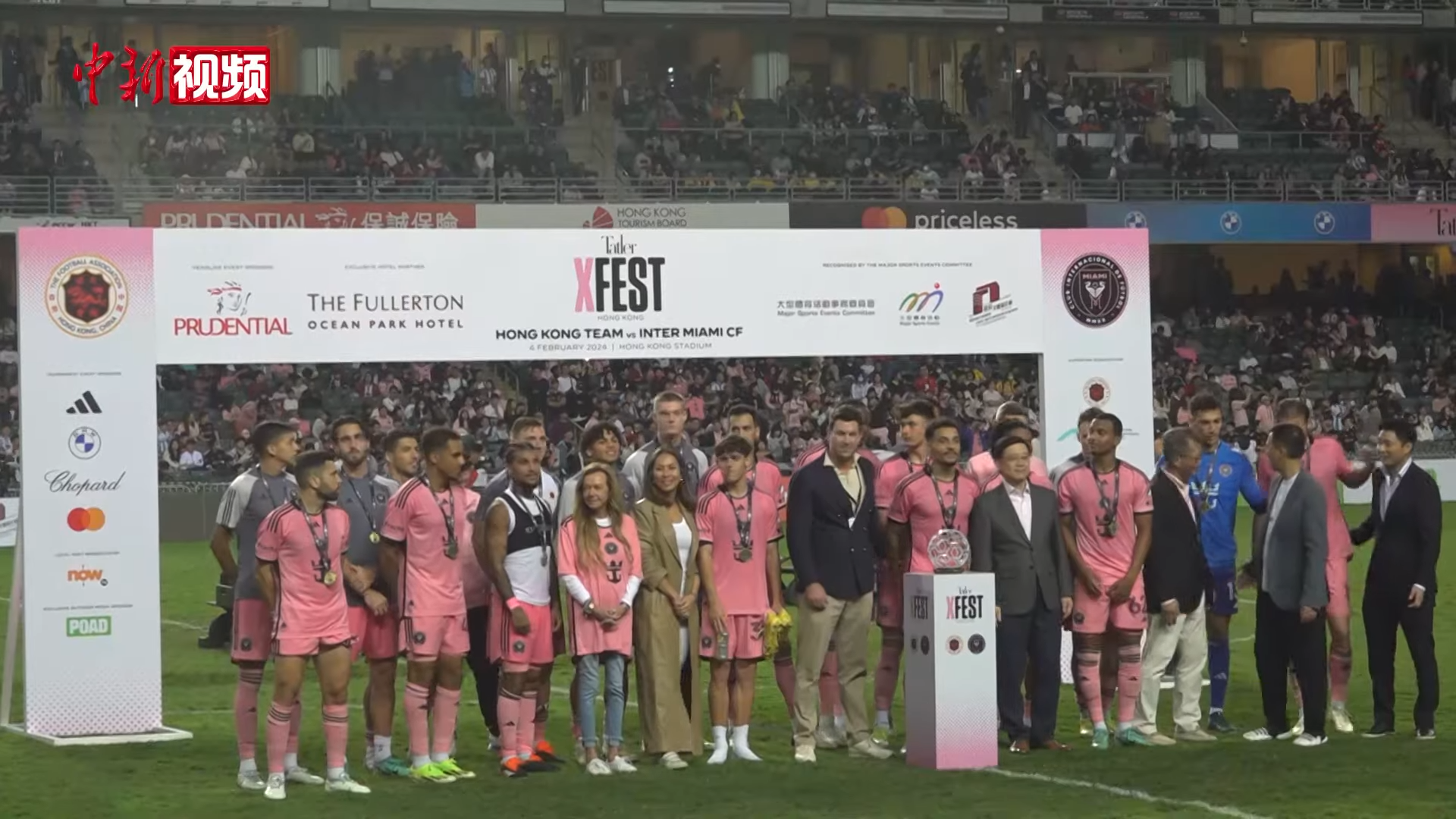
John Lee is seen in prize-giving ceremony but Messi is not at front row.

Regina Ip, Executive Council convenor, wrote on X (formerly Twitter) "Hong Kong people hate Messi, Inter Miami, and the 'black hand' (Note: "Black Hand" is a term used by China to allege foreign interference in 2019 Hong Kong protests) behind them, for the deliberate and calculated snub to Hong Kong". Ip added that Hong Kong should never allow Messi to visit again. While admitting that she had no evidence of foreign interference, she said, "Messi behaved as though he was under some political directive not to play, not to shake hands with Hong Kong's CE, not to speak, or smile or wave to Hong Kong's fans. He apologised in Tokyo. Why not in Hong Kong?" Hu Xijin, former editor of Global Times, also questioned these circumstances.

Inter Miami reiterated that it was sorry Messi did not play and that injuries were "unfortunately a part of the beautiful game", and that it is no one's fault that players get injured in football.

Another conspiracy theory singled out Inter Miami's Cuban-American co-owner Jorge Mas, who was linked to hawkish former US President Ronald Reagan. Some judged this relationship and concluded that US-related involvement could not be ruled out. Some pro-Beijing mouthpieces including Ta Kung Pao implied a connection between the incident and the Central Intelligence Agency via Mas's late father, Jorge Mas Canosa, who in the 1960s was trained by the CIA for the Bay of Pigs Invasion.

Online Chinese nationalists, dubbed Little Pink, launched a barrage of hostility on Messi's Instagram and Weibo accounts. One message read: "China does not welcome dwarves like you and please tell your Argentina football fans that the Falkland Islands belongs to England." Similar comments were found as well in the Weibo account of the Argentine Embassy in Beijing.

Messi posted a two-minute Spanish video on 19 February, telling fans that it was "totally untrue" that he sat out the match for political reasons, and reiterated that he had been suffering from inflamed leg muscles. He also sent his "good wishes" to China: "I've had a very close and special relationship with China. I've done lots of things in China: interviews, games and events. I've also been there and played many times for FC Barcelona and the [Argentinian] national team."

=== Backlash ===
Argentina's national team was scheduled to play two friendly international matches in March, against Nigeria in Hangzhou and Ivory Coast in Beijing. But on 9 February, Hangzhou sports authorities said the match had been cancelled for "current well-known reasons" and "conditions to hold the friendly match are not mature". The following day, Beijing authorities announced that the government "currently has no plans to host relevant competitions in which Messi will participate". The Chinese Football Association suspended its partnership with the Argentine Football Association over the incident. The cancelled friendlies were replaced with two matches in the United States, against El Salvador and Costa Rica respectively. Messi would not participate in either friendly regardless due to a hamstring injury he sustained against Nashville SC in the 2024 CONCACAF Champions Cup.

Chinese state broadcaster CCTV Sports Channel replaced frames of Messi winning the World Cup in a television programme with Philipp Lahm's victory in 2014. This was soon removed as well when it was realized that Lahm had previously criticised China's human rights problems and urged athletes in democratic countries to reveal their political stance. A Messi commercial was taken off air, while others remained despite pressure from Chinese social-media users.
