= Ma Hei Wai =

Hong Kong footballer

Ma Hei Wai 馬希偉
Personal information
- Full name: Timmy Ma Hei Wai
- Date of birth: 3 February 2004 (age 22)
- Place of birth: Hong Kong
- Height: 1.75 m (5 ft 9 in)
- Position: Midfielder

Team information
- Current team: Shaanxi Union
- Number: 20

Youth career
- –2015: Kitchee
- 2015–2018: CFCSSHK
- 2018–2019: Eastern
- 2019–2020: GS Loures
- 2020: Eastern

Senior career*
Years	Team	Apps	(Gls)
2020–2025	Eastern	54	(9)
2025–	Shaanxi Union	22	(4)

International career^{‡}
2019	Hong Kong U15	2	(0)
2022	Hong Kong U20	3	(0)
2023–	Hong Kong U22	2	(0)
2025–	Hong Kong U23	6	(0)
2024–	Hong Kong	5	(1)
- * Club domestic league appearances and goals as of 7 November 2026 ‡ National team caps and goals as of 23 September 2026

Timmy Ma Hei Wai (Chinese: 馬希偉; born 3 February 2004) is a Hong Kong professional footballer who currently plays as a midfielder for China League One club Shaanxi Union and the Hong Kong national team.

== Club career ==
In October 2020, Ma was promoted to the first team of Eastern.

On 1 November 2020, Ma made his professional debut for Eastern in a Hong Kong Sapling Cup match against Southern.

In the 2023–24 season, Ma was awarded the Best Young Player of the Year.

On 10 July 2025, Ma joined China League One club Shaanxi Union. After the end of the 2025 season, Ma went to Italy with three of his teammates to train at Serie C side Pro Vercelli.

== International career ==
On 6 June 2024, Ma made his international debut for Hong Kong in a World Cup qualifier against Iran. He started the game and scored in the 14th minute to make the score 1–1, before being substituted in the 57th minute as the game ended with Iran's 4–2 victory.

On 22 January 2025, Ma represented Hong Kong to play against Guangdong in the Guangdong–Hong Kong Cup.

== Career statistics ==
=== International ===
As of 9 June 2026

National team	Year	Apps	Goals
Hong Kong	2024	3	1
Hong Kong	2025	0	0
Hong Kong	2026	2	0
Total		5	1

#	Date	Venue	Opponent	Result	Competition
2024
1	6 June 2024	Hong Kong Stadium, So Kon Po, Hong Kong	Iran	2–4	2026 FIFA World Cup qualification – AFC second round
2	11 June 2024	Ashgabat Stadium, Ashgabat, Turkmenistan	Turkmenistan	0–0	2026 FIFA World Cup qualification – AFC second round

=== International goals ===
No.	Date	Venue	Opponent	Score	Result	Competition
1	6 June 2024	Hong Kong Stadium, So Kon Po, Hong Kong	Iran	1–1	2–4	2026 FIFA World Cup qualification

== Honour ==
Eastern

- Hong Kong FA Cup: 2023–24
- Hong Kong Senior Shield: 2024–25
