= Calum Hall =

Scottish footballer (born 2000)

Personal information
- Full name: Calum Renwick Hall
- Date of birth: 3 August 2000 (age 26)
- Place of birth: Scotland
- Height: 1.72 m (5 ft 8 in)
- Position: Right back

Team information
- Current team: Southern
- Number: 2

Youth career
- –2014: Hutchison Vale
- 2014–2017: Hibernian

Senior career*
| Years | Team | Apps | (Gls) |
| 2017–2020 | Edinburgh City | 21 | (0) |
| 2019 | → Vale of Leithen (loan) | | |
| 2020 | → East Kilbride (loan) | | |
| 2020–2023 | Gala Fairydean Rovers | 26 | (1) |
| 2023–2026 | Eastern | 58 | (2) |
| 2026– | Southern | 5 | (0) |
- * Club domestic league appearances and goals as of 7 November 2026

Calum Renwick Hall (born 3 August 2000) is a Scottish professional footballer who currently plays as a right back for Hong Kong Premier League club Southern.

== Early life ==
Hall started his football career in non-league team Hutchison Vale. He was signed by Hibernian in 2014.

== Club career ==
On 14 July 2017, Hall joined Scottish League Two side Edinburgh City following his release by Hibernian. Hall was originally set to join the club's under-20 team, he was promoted to the first team after impressing after joining.

On 10 July 2019, Hall was loaned to Lowland League side Vale of Leithen.

On 31 January 2020, Hall was loaned to Lowland League team East Kilbride, in a deal that saw Graeme Holmes moving the other way, signing for Edinburgh City on a permanent deal.

In the summer of 2020, Hall joined Gala Fairydean Rovers. In March 2023, he helped the club win the East of Scotland Cup, following a penalty shoot-out win against Linlithgow Rose.

On 4 August 2023, Hall moved abroad and signed his first professional contract with Hong Kong Premier League club Eastern. Four days later, in a friendly match between Eastern and Lee Man, Hall collapsed due to heat illness. On 20 August, he made his competitive debut for Eastern against HK U23, coming off the bench in the first half to replace the injured Daniel Almazan.

In February 2024, Hall was selected to represent Hong Kong in an unofficial friendly against Inter Miami CF. He started the match on the bench, and was substituted on at half-time.

On 5 July 2026, Hall joined Southern.

== Style of play ==
Hall mainly operates as a defender or a midfielder.

== Personal life ==
Hall is the son of John Hall and Billie Hall.

Hall worked as a construction worker before turning professional with Eastern in the summer of 2023.

== Career statistics ==
As of 2 January 2025

Appearances and goals by club, season and competition
| Club | Season | League | | | National Cup | | League Cup | | Continental | | Other | | Total | |
| Club | Season | Division | Apps | Goals | Apps | Goals | Apps | Goals | Apps | Goals | Apps | Goals | Apps | Goals |
|---|---|---|---|---|---|---|---|---|---|---|---|---|---|---|
| Edinburgh City | 2017–18 | Scottish League Two | 15 | 0 | 1 | 0 | 2 | 0 | — | | 1 (Note: Appearance in the Scottish Challenge Cup) | 0 | 19 | 0 |
| Edinburgh City | 2018–19 | Scottish League Two | 6 | 0 | 2 | 0 | 2 | 0 | — | | 3 | 0 | 13 | 0 |
| Edinburgh City | 2019–20 | Scottish League Two | 0 | 0 | 0 | 0 | 0 | 0 | — | | 0 | 0 | 0 | 0 |
| Edinburgh City | Total | | 21 | 0 | 3 | 0 | 4 | 0 | — | | 4 | 0 | 32 | 0 |
| Gala Fairydean Rovers | 2020–21 | Lowland Football League | ? | ? | 2 | 0 | ? | ? | — | | ? | ? | 2 | 0 |
| Gala Fairydean Rovers | 2021–22 | Lowland Football League | ? | ? | 3 | 0 | ? | ? | — | | ? | ? | 3 | 0 |
| Gala Fairydean Rovers | 2022–23 | Lowland Football League | 26 | 1 | 0 | 0 | ? | ? | — | | ? | ? | 26 | 1 |
| Gala Fairydean Rovers | Total | | 26 | 1 | 5 | 0 | 0 | 0 | — | | 0 | 0 | 31 | 1 |
| Eastern | 2023–24 | Hong Kong Premier League | 19 | 0 | 3 | 0 | 8 (Note: Appearances in the Sapling Cup) | 0 | — | | 4 (Note: Three appearances in the Hong Kong Senior Challenge Shield, one appearance in the HKPLC Cup) | 0 | 34 | 0 |
| Eastern | 2024–25 | Hong Kong Premier League | 6 | 0 | 0 | 0 | 3 | 1 | 6 (Note: Appearances in the AFC Champions League Two) | 0 | 2 (Note: Appearances in the Hong Kong Senior Challenge Shield) | 0 | 17 | 1 |
| Eastern | Total | | 25 | 0 | 3 | 0 | 11 | 1 | 6 | 0 | 6 | 0 | 51 | 1 |
| Career total | | | 72 | 1 | 11 | 0 | 15 | 1 | 6 | 0 | 10 | 0 | 114 | 2 |

== Honour ==
Gala Fairydean Rovers

- East of Scotland Cup: 2022–23

Eastern

- Hong Kong FA Cup: 2023–24, 2024–25
- Hong Kong Senior Shield: 2024–25
