= Lam Hin Ting =

Hong Kong footballer

Lam Hin Ting 林衍廷
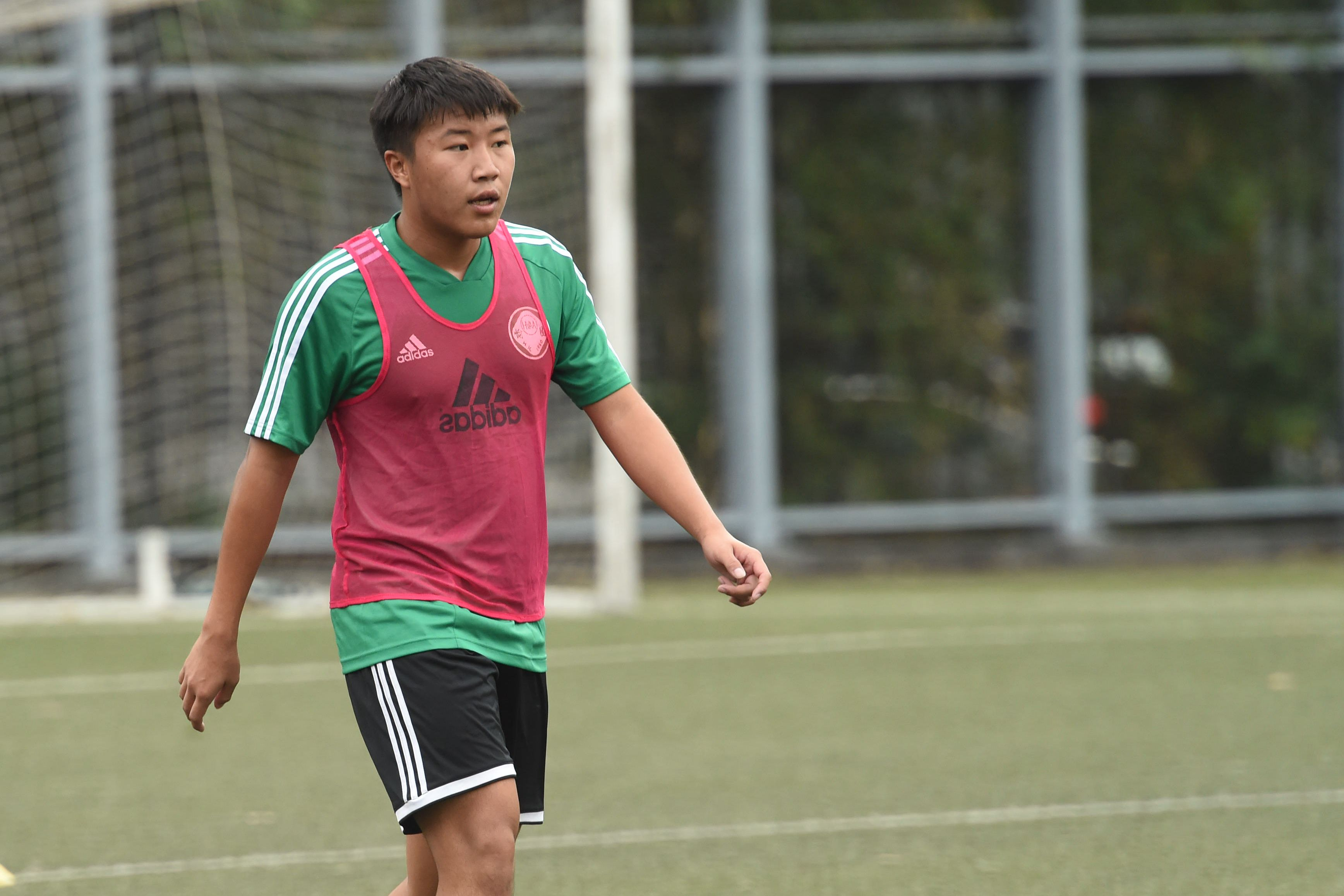

Personal information
- Full name: Lam Hin Ting
- Date of birth: 9 December 1999 (age 26)
- Place of birth: Hong Kong
- Height: 1.74 m (5 ft 9 in)
- Positions: Defensive midfielder; left back; right back

Team information
- Current team: Eastern
- Number: 32

Youth career
- 2008–2009: Kitchee
- 2009–2016: CFCSSHK

Senior career*
Years	Team	Apps	(Gls)
2016–2017	R&F	8	(0)
2017–2019	Dreams	28	(5)
2019–2020	R&F	5	(0)
2020–2021	Happy Valley	11	(1)
2021–2024	Rangers (HKG)	29	(0)
2024–	Eastern	38	(1)

International career^{‡}
2017	Hong Kong U-19	2	(0)
2018–2021	Hong Kong U-22	6	(0)
2023–	Hong Kong	5	(0)
- * Club domestic league appearances and goals as of 22 November 2026 ‡ National team caps and goals as of 31 March 2026

Lam Hin Ting (Chinese: 林衍廷; born 9 December 1999) is a Hong Kong professional footballer who currently plays as a holding midfielder for Hong Kong Premier League club Eastern and the Hong Kong national team.

== Youth career ==
Lam spent one year of his football career at Hong Kong Barcelona Football School before spending the next eight years with Chelsea Soccer School. In March 2016, he went on a 20-day trial with Portuguese club Cova da Piedade. However, due to the language barrier between him and his teammates, he was unable to communicate with them and was not offered a contract.

== Club career ==
=== R&F ===
Upon Lam's return to Hong Kong, he resumed his school education. Three days after his returned, he was contacted by R&F coach Leung Chi Wing who offered him a chance to play professional football at a RMB$6,000 per month salary. He agreed to the deal and trained with the team at its Sanshui base.

Lam was handed his first team debut 18 September 2016 in a Senior Shield match versus Hong Kong Sapling and at age 16, became the youngest player to appear in the competition. On 1 October, he made his first league appearance in a game against Pegasus.

In recognition of his performances, he was named a finalist for the Best Young Player award for 2016–17.

=== Dreams ===
After the conclusion of the 2016-17 season, Lam considered returning to Portugal for another trial. He ultimately decided to sign with Dreams, following Leung who had been named the manager of the club. He scored his first two goals for the club in a 4–2 win over Southern.

=== R&F ===
Following Dreams' decision to self-relegate, Lam rejoined R&F, signing a contract on 24 July 2019.

On 14 October 2020, Lam left the club after his club's withdrawal from the HKPL in the new season.

=== Happy Valley ===
On 10 November 2020, Lam signed with Happy Valley.

=== Rangers ===
On 14 July 2021, it was reported that Lam would sign with Rangers.

=== Eastern ===
On 6 June 2024, Lam signed with Eastern, a club for whom he had once played for at the youth level.

== International career ==
On 16 November 2023, Lam made his international debut for Hong Kong in the World Cup qualifiers against Iran.

On 26 December 2023, Lam was named in Hong Kong's squad for the 2023 AFC Asian Cup.

== Disciplinary issues ==
Throughout his career, Lam has been on the end of supplemental discipline due to poor behaviour.

On 21 March 2021, Lam was sent off post-match for alleged sexual harassment of referee Gigi Law. This allegation was confirmed by the Hong Kong Football Association on 19 April 2021 and Lam was banned 10 matches.

On 28 December 2021, the HKFA banned Lam from representing Hong Kong for one year and fined him $6,000 after it emerged that Lam and his teammates broke team rules and violated COVID-19 protocols during the 2022 AFC U-23 Asian Cup qualification tournament in Japan.

On 10 September 2022, videos began circulating on the internet of Lam tossing his kit at a referee after being sent off in a local futsal match. Rangers responded by suspending Lam indefinitely for his actions and for participating in football activity without permission from the club.

== Career statistics ==
=== Club ===
As of 26 May 2024

Club	Season	League			National Cup		Other Cups		Continental		Other		Total	
Club	Season	Division	Apps	Goals	Apps	Goals	Apps	Goals	Apps	Goals	Apps	Goals	Apps	Goals
R&F	2016–17	Hong Kong Premier League	8	0	1	0	1 (Note: Appearances in the Sapling Cup)	0	0	0	1 (Note: Appearances in the Senior Shield)	0	11	0
Dreams	2017–18	Hong Kong Premier League	15	5	0	0	5	1	0	0	0	0	20	6
Dreams	2018–19	Hong Kong Premier League	13	0	3	0	4	1	0	0	1	0	21	1
R&F	2019–20	Hong Kong Premier League	5	0	1	0	7	0	0	0	0	0	13	0
Happy Valley	2020–21	Hong Kong Premier League	11	1	0	0	3	0	0	0	0	0	14	1
Rangers	2021–22	Hong Kong Premier League	1	0	2	0	6	0	0	0	0	0	9	0
Rangers	2022–23	Hong Kong Premier League	15	0	3	0	8	0	0	0	2	0	28	0
Rangers	2023–24	Hong Kong Premier League	13	0	1	0	4	0	1 (Note: Appearances in the AFC Champions League qualification)	0	2	0	21	0
Career total			81	6	11	0	38	2	1	0	6	0	137	8

=== International ===
As of 31 March 2026

National team	Year	Apps	Goals
Hong Kong	2023	1	0
Hong Kong	2024	3	0
Hong Kong	2026	1	0
Total		5	0

#	Date	Venue	Opponent	Result	Competition
1	16 November 2023	Azadi Stadium, Tehran, Iran	Iran	0–4	2026 FIFA World Cup qualification – AFC second round
2	1 January 2024	Baniyas Stadium, Abu Dhabi, United Arab Emirates	China	2–1	Friendly
3	26 March 2024	Milliy Stadium, Tashkent, Uzbekistan	Uzbekistan	0–3	2026 FIFA World Cup qualification – AFC second round
4	11 June 2024	Ashgabat Stadium, Ashgabat, Turkmenistan	Turkmenistan	0–0	2026 FIFA World Cup qualification – AFC second round

== Honours ==
=== Club ===
Rangers

- Hong Kong Sapling Cup: 2023–24

Eastern

- Hong Kong FA Cup: 2024–25
- Hong Kong Senior Shield: 2024–25

=== Individual ===
- Best Young Player: 2018
