= Víctor Bertomeu =

Spanish association football player

Personal information
- Full name: Víctor Bertomeu de la Hoz
- Date of birth: 19 October 1992 (age 34)
- Place of birth: Amposta, Spain
- Height: 1.85 m (6 ft 1 in)
- Position: Striker

Team information
- Current team: Þór Akureyri
- Number: 9

Youth career
- –2010: Amposta
- 2010–2011: Gimnàstic

Senior career*
Years	Team	Apps	(Gls)
2009–2010	Amposta	5	(0)
2011–2015	Pobla Mafumet	78	(15)
2015	Gimnàstic	2	(0)
2015–2019	Ascó	128	(36)
2019–2020	Peralada	21	(5)
2020–2021	Horta	6	(0)
2021	Prat	14	(2)
2021–2023	Eastern	18	(9)
2023–2024	Gresik United	13	(7)
2024–2025	Eastern	14	(4)
2025	Ischia	6	(1)
2026	Kerala Blasters	9	(4)
2026–	Þór Akureyri	7	(0)
- * Club domestic league appearances and goals as of 16 November 2026

Víctor Bertomeu de la Hoz (born 19 October 1992) is a Spanish professional footballer who plays as a striker for Icelandic club Þór Akureyri.

== Club career ==
On 20 September 2021, Bertomeu joined Hong Kong Premier League club Eastern.

In September 2023, Bertomeu joined Liga 2 club Gresik United.

On 19 August 2024, Bertomeu rejoined Eastern after a season.

On 29 January 2026, Indian Super League club Kerala Blasters announced the signing of Bertomeu. On 28 March, he scored his first for the club in a 2–1 loss against Inter Kashi.

== Honour ==
Eastern

- Hong Kong FA Cup: 2024–25
- Hong Kong Senior Shield: 2024–25
