= Alexander Jojo =

Hong Kong footballer (born 1999)

Alexander Jojo 亞歷斯祖
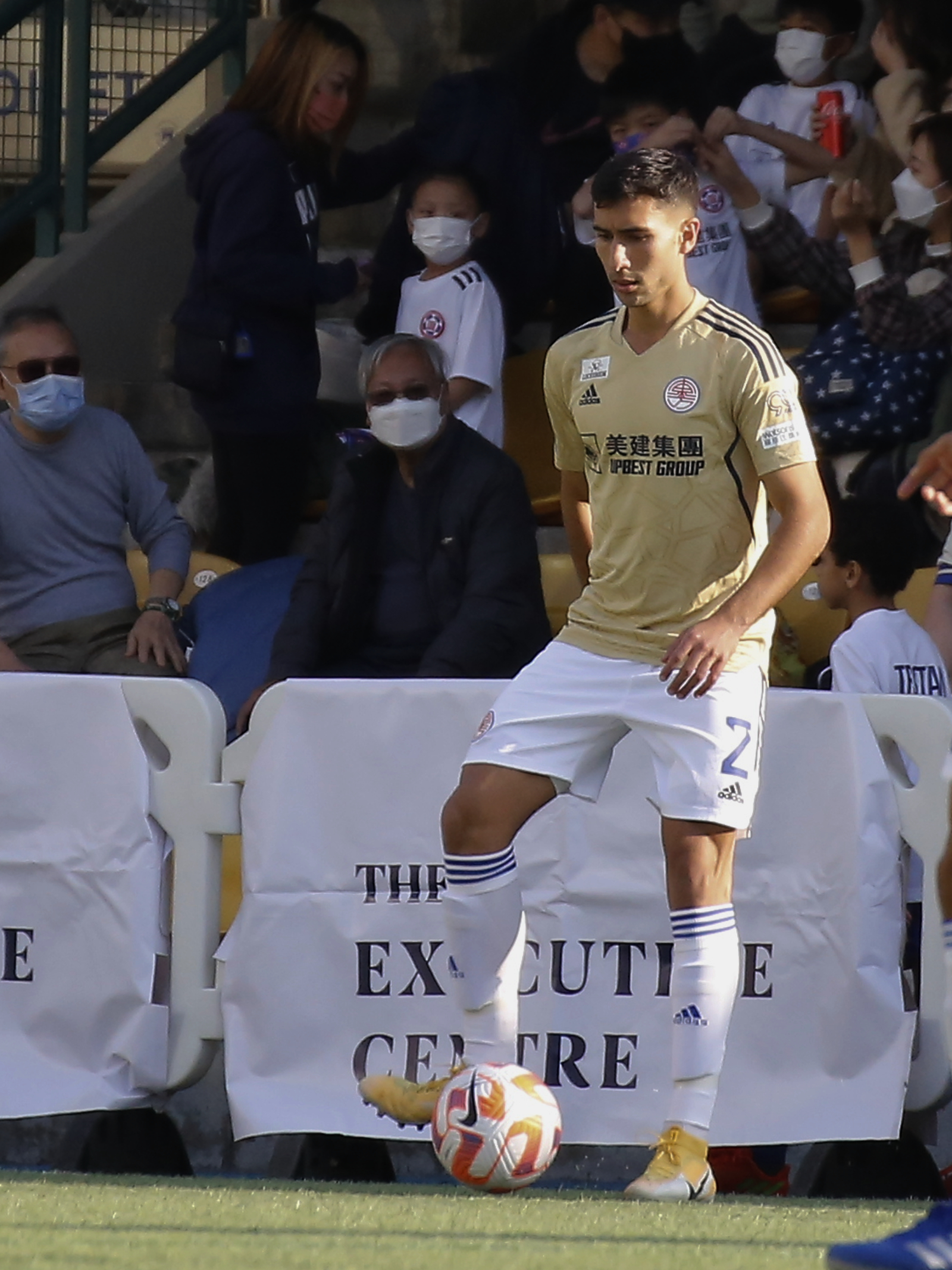
- Alexander Jojo with Eastern

Personal information
- Full name: Christian Alexander Jojo
- Date of birth: 11 February 1999 (age 27)
- Place of birth: Hong Kong
- Height: 1.83 m (6 ft 0 in)
- Positions: Right back; left back

Team information
- Current team: Chengdu Rongcheng
- Number: 3

Youth career
- –2017: HKFC
- 2017–2019: Vizela

Senior career*
Years	Team	Apps	(Gls)
2019–2020	Happy Valley	8	(0)
2020–2023	Eastern	20	(1)
2023	Tai Po	0	(0)
2024–2025	IK Oddevold	3	(0)
2024–2025	→ Eastern (loan)	20	(2)
2025	Shanghai Port	7	(0)
2026–	Chengdu Rongcheng	7	(0)

International career^{‡}
2021	Hong Kong U23	7	(0)
2024–	Hong Kong	8	(0)
- * Club domestic league appearances and goals as of 8 November 2026 ‡ National team caps and goals as of 31 March 2026 (UTC)

Christian Alexander Jojo (Chinese: 亞歷斯祖; born 11 February 1999) is a Hong Kong professional footballer who currently plays as a right back or a left back for Chinese Super League club Chengdu Rongcheng and the Hong Kong national team.

== Club career ==
On 29 August 2019, Jojo signed his first professional contract with Hong Kong Premier League club Happy Valley.

On 1 July 2020, Jojo signed with Eastern following the expiration of his contract with Happy Valley.

On 7 September 2023, Jojo joined Tai Po.

On 9 December 2023, Jojo joined Superettan club IK Oddevold.

On 8 August 2024, Jojo rejoined Eastern on loan for the 2024–25 season.

On 17 July 2025, Jojo joined Chinese Super League club Shanghai Port. On 22 November 2025, Jojo became the first player from Hong Kong to lift the Chinese Super League trophy.

On 5 February 2026, Jojo joined another CSL club Chengdu Rongcheng.

== International career ==
Jojo was born in Hong Kong to an English father, and his mother is half Swedish and half Ethiopian. On 28 April 2021, he announced that he had received a Hong Kong passport after giving up his British passport and Swedish passport, making him eligible to represent Hong Kong internationally.

Jojo was called up to the Hong Kong national team for two international friendlies against Myanmar on 21 and 24 September 2022.

Jojo was part of the Hong Kong side at the 2022 Asian Games which advanced to the semi-finals. Hong Kong had beaten Iran U-23 1–0 in the quarter-finals.

On 8 September 2024, Jojo made his international debut for Hong Kong in a friendly match against Fiji.

== Career statistics ==
=== Club ===
As of 1 July 2026.

Appearances and goals by club, season and competition
Club	Season	League			FA Cup		League Cup		Continental		Other		Total	
Club	Season	Division	Apps	Goals	Apps	Goals	Apps	Goals	Apps	Goals	Apps	Goals	Apps	Goals
Happy Valley	2019–20	Hong Kong Premier League	8	0	1	0	1 (Note: Appearances in the Hong Kong Senior Shield)	0	–		6 (Note: Appearances in Hong Kong Sapling Cup)	0	16	0
Eastern	2019–20	Hong Kong Premier League	1	0	0	0	0	0	–		0	0	1	0
Eastern	2020–21	Hong Kong Premier League	3	0	–		–		3 (Note: Appearances in the AFC Cup)	0	5	0	11	0
Eastern	2021–22	Hong Kong Premier League	0	0	1	0	–		1	0	2	0	4	0
Eastern	2022–23	Hong Kong Premier League	16	1	2	0	3	0	–		6	0	27	1
Eastern	Total		20	1	3	0	3	0	4	0	13	0	43	1
Tai Po	2023–24	Hong Kong Premier League	0	0	1	0	1	0	–		4	0	6	0
IK Oddevold	2024	Superettan	3	0	0	0	–		–		–		3	0
Eastern (loan)	2024–25	Hong Kong Premier League	20	2	2	0	3	0	6	0	1	0	32	2
Shanghai Port	2025	Chinese Super League	7	0	0	0	–		6 (Note: Appearances in the AFC Champions League)	0	0 (Note: Appearances in Chinese FA Super Cup)	0	13	0
Chengdu Rongcheng	2026	Chinese Super League	5	0	0	0	–		–		–		5	0
Career total			63	2	7	0	8	0	16	0	24	0	118	2

=== International ===
As of 31 March 2026

National team	Year	Apps	Goals
Hong Kong	2024	3	0
Hong Kong	2025	4	0
Hong Kong	2026	1	0
Total		8	0

== Honours ==
Eastern

- Hong Kong FA Cup: 2024–25
- Hong Kong Senior Shield: 2024–25
- Hong Kong Sapling Cup: 2020–21

Shanghai Port

- Chinese Super League: 2025
