= 2024–25 Hong Kong Senior Shield =

Tournament details
- Country: Hong Kong
- Dates: 8 September 2024 – 30 January 2025
- Teams: 9

Final positions
- Champions: Eastern
- Runners-up: Lee Man

Tournament statistics
- Matches played: 8
- Goals scored: 23 (2.88 per match)
- Attendance: 9,733 (1,217 per match)
- Top goal scorer(s): Henri Anier (5 goals)

Awards
- Best player: Leung Kwun Chung

2024–25 Hong Kong Senior Shield was the 121st season of the Hong Kong Senior Shield. Nine teams entered this edition, with one match being played in the first round before the quarter-finals stage. The competition was only open to teams that played in the 2024–25 Hong Kong Premier League.

The champions received HK$150,000 in prize money while the runners up received HK$50,000. The best player of the final received a HK$10,000 bonus. In addition, the two losing teams in semi-finals received HK$20,000 while the remaining teams received HK$5,000.

Kitchee were the defending champions but were eliminated in the semi-finals. Eastern became the champions for the 12th time after beating Lee Man in the final.

== Calendar ==
Stage	Round	Draw Date	Date	Matches	Clubs
Knockout	First round	27 August 2024	8 September 2024	1	9 → 8
Knockout	Quarter-finals	27 August 2024	26 October – 23 November 2024	4	8 → 4
Knockout	Semi-finals	27 August 2024	30 November – 1 December 2024	2	4 → 2
Knockout	Final	27 August 2024	30 January 2025	1	2 → 1

== Bracket ==
First round
8 September 2024
**Southern**	**3**
Kowloon City	0

Quarter-finals
26 October 2024
**Rangers**	**1**
HKFC	0
23 November 2024
**Eastern**	**1**
Southern	0
27 October 2024
**Lee Man**	**5**
North District	1
26 October 2024
**Kitchee**	**3**
Tai Po	1

Semi-finals
1 December 2024
Rangers	1
**Eastern**	**3**
30 November 2024
**Lee Man**	**2**
Kitchee	1

Final
30 January 2025
**Eastern**	**1**
Lee Man	0

Bold = winner
* = after extra time, ( ) = penalty shootout score

== Fixtures and results ==
=== First round ===
8 September 2024 SS01	**Southern**	**3–0**	Kowloon City	Sham Shui Po Sports Ground
15:30	Gregory 16', 70'; Jackson 89'	Report		Attendance: 460; Referee: Yu Kin Fung

=== Quarter-finals ===
26 October 2024 SS02	**Rangers**	**1–0**	HKFC	Tai Po Sports Ground
15:00	Yiu Ho Ming 45'	Report		Attendance: 145; Referee: Ho Wai Sing

26 October 2024 SS05	**Kitchee**	**3–1**	Tai Po	Mong Kok Stadium
15:00	Bae Jae-woo 30'; Temirov 38'; Mingazow 64'	Report	Cividini 52'	Attendance: 1,412; Referee: Luk Kin Sun

27 October 2024 SS04	**Lee Man**	**5–1**	North District	Tai Po Sports Ground
15:00	Anier 9', 45', 52', 65'; Hamad 62'	Report	Lo Kong Wai 38'	Attendance: 327; Referee: Tam Ping Wun

23 November 2024 SS03	**Eastern**	**1–0**	Southern	Mong Kok Stadium
18:00	Bertomeu 1'	Report		Attendance: 812; Referee: Tam Ping Wun

=== Semi-finals ===
30 November 2024 SS06	**Lee Man**	**2–1**	Kitchee	Mong Kok Stadium
15:00	Anier 16'; Everton 47'	Report	Temirov 45+4'	Attendance: 1,573; Referee: Lau Fong Hei

1 December 2024 SS07	Rangers	**1–3**	**Eastern**	Tseung Kwan O Sports Ground
15:00	Lau Chi Lok 44'	Report	Baffoe 10', 90+2'; Almazan 50'	Attendance: 509; Referee: Luk Kin Sun

=== Final ===
30 January 2025 SS08	**Eastern**	**1–0**	Lee Man	Mong Kok Stadium
15:00	Bertomeu 32'	Report		Attendance: 4,495; Referee: Ho Wai Sing

== Final ==
30 January 2025
15:00

Eastern	1–0	Lee Man
Bertomeu 32'	Report

Mong Kok Stadium
Attendance: 4,495
Referee: Ho Wai Sing

**Eastern**	**Lee Man**

GK	1	(Hong Kong) Yapp Hung Fai
RB	2	(Scotland) Calum Hall
CB	6	(Serbia) Aleksander Mitrovic	(yellow card) 52'
CF	7	(Spain) Noah Baffoe
LW	9	(Spain) Víctor Bertomeu		(substituted off) 80'
CB	16	(Hong Kong) Leung Chun Pong
LB	19	(Hong Kong) Alexander Jojo	(yellow card) 42'
DM	22	(Hong Kong) Leung Kwun Chung (c)	(yellow card) 15'
RW	23	(Hong Kong) Ma Hei Wai		(substituted off) 90+4'
DM	27	(Spain) Marcos Gondra
CM	32	(Hong Kong) Lam Hin Ting		(substituted off) 37'
Substitutes:
GK	26	(Hong Kong) Liu Fu Yuen
GK	40	(Hong Kong) Chung Hoi Man
LW	10	(Brazil) Felipe Sá		(substituted on) 37'
CB	20	(Colombia) Carlos Pérez		(substituted on) 80'
CM	28	(Hong Kong) Siu Ching
CF	29	(Hong Kong) Liu Hing Yau
RW	32	(Hong Kong) Gao Ming Ho		(substituted on) 90+4'
CB	35	(Hong Kong) Lam Chin Yu
CM	42	(Hong Kong) Yeung Tung Ki
AM	44	(Hong Kong) Prabhat Gurung
RW	77	(Hong Kong) Lee Chun Ting
CM	88	(Hong Kong) Cheung Man Ho
Head Coach:
(Hong Kong) Roberto Losada

GK	28	(Hong Kong) Chan Ka Ho
LB	4	(Japan) Ryoya Tachibana	(yellow card) 55'
DM	6	(Hong Kong) Wu Chun Ming
AM	7	(Netherlands) Mitchel Paulissen	(yellow card) 60'	(substituted off) 78'
RW	8	(Hong Kong) Everton
CF	9	(Estonia) Henri Anier		(substituted off) 88'
DM	10	(Hong Kong) Wong Wai (c)
CB	13	(Hong Kong) Li Ngai Hoi
RB	26	(Hong Kong) Wong Chun Ho	(yellow card) 38'	(substituted off) 69'
CB	55	(Hong Kong) Yu Wai Lim
LW	99	(Afghanistan) Taufee Skandari		(substituted off) 69'
Substitutes:
GK	1	(Hong Kong) Leung Hing Kit
GK	25	(Hong Kong) Poon Sheung Hei
RW	11	(Hong Kong) Cheng Siu Kwan		(substituted on) 88'
LB	12	(Hong Kong) Law Cheuk Hei
DM	16	(Hong Kong) Ngan Lok Fung
LW	17	(Hong Kong) Chang Hei Yin		(substituted on) 78'
CM	18	(Hong Kong) Tang In Chim
CB	19	(South Korea) Kim Min-kyu		(substituted on) 69'
LB	31	(Hong Kong) Yung Hui To
CF	47	(Hong Kong) Lau Ka Kiu	(yellow card) 82'	(substituted on) 69'
Head coach:
(Wales) Matthew Holland

Player of the Match:
Leung Kwun Chung (Eastern)

Assistant Referees:
Law Ming Leong
Chow Chun Kit
Fourth Official:
Lau Fong Hei

**Match rules**

- 90 minutes
- 30 minutes of extra time if necessary
- Penalty shoot-out if scores still level
- Maximum of five substitutions, with a sixth allowed in extra time

== Top scorers ==
Rank	Player	Club	Goals
1	(Estonia) Henri Anier	Lee Man	5
2	(Spain) Noah Baffoe	Eastern	2
2	(Spain) Víctor Bertomeu	Eastern	2
2	(Brazil) Gregory	Southern	2
2	(Uzbekistan) Sherzod Temirov	Kitchee	2
6	10 players		1
