= 1895–96 Hongkong Football Cup =

Tournament details
- Country: Hong Kong

Final positions
- Champions: Kowloon (1st title)
- Runners-up: H.M.S. Centurion

1895–96 Hongkong Football Cup was the inaugural season of the Hongkong Football Cup, which is now known as Hong Kong Senior Shield.

The holder of the cup this season was Kowloon Football Club.

== Unknown round ==
Team 1	Score	Team 2	Date & time	Venue	Referee	Notes
35th Company, S.D., R.A.	5–0	E Company, R.B.	1895-11-12 16:15	Happy Valley (Hongkong Football Club)		The first tie
B Company, R.B.	3–0	G Company, R.B.	1895-11-26 16:15	Happy Valley		"Second round"
F Co., R.B.		A Co., R.B.	1895-11-29 16:15			"Second round"
Hongkong Football Club		Police	1895-12-05 16:15			

== Final ==
1896-03-07
16:00

H.M.S. Centurion	0–3	Kowloon

Happy Valley
Referee: King
