= HMS Barfleur (1892) =

British pre-dreadnought battleship

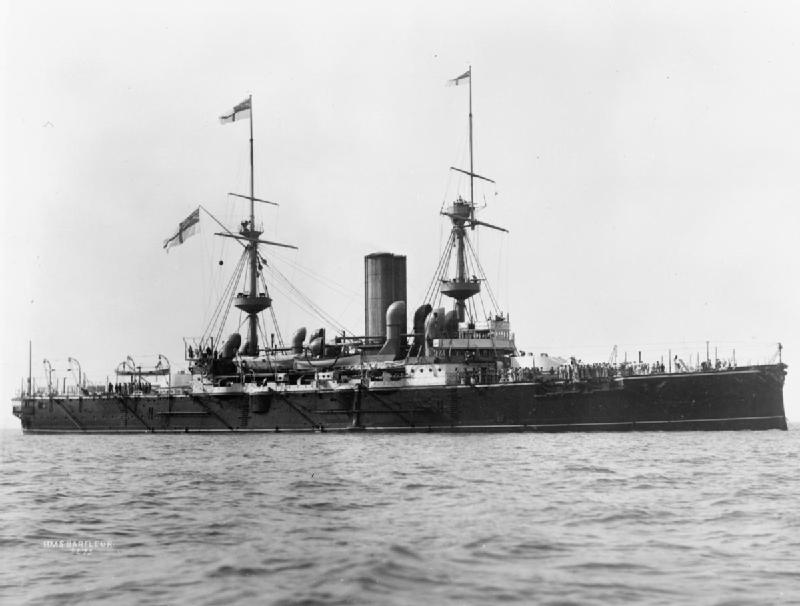
- Barfleur, 1895

History

United Kingdom
- Name: Barfleur
- Namesake: Battle of Barfleur
- Builder: HM Dockyard, Chatham
- Cost: £533,666
- Laid down: 12 October 1890
- Launched: 10 August 1892
- Completed: June 1894
- Commissioned: 22 June 1894
- Decommissioned: June 1909
- Fate: Sold for scrap, 12 July 1910

General characteristics (as built)
- Class & type: Centurion-class pre-dreadnought battleship
- Displacement: 10,634 long tons (10,805 t)
- Length: 390 ft 9 in (119.1 m) (o/a)
- Beam: 70 ft (21.3 m)
- Draught: 25 ft 8 in (7.82 m)
- Installed power: 9,000 ihp (6,700 kW); 8 Cylindrical boilers
- Propulsion: 2 Shafts; 2 Triple-expansion steam engines
- Speed: 17 knots (31 km/h; 20 mph)
- Range: 5,230 nmi (9,690 km; 6,020 mi) at 10 knots (19 km/h; 12 mph)
- Complement: 606–620
- Armament: 2 × twin 10 in (254 mm) guns; 10 × single 4.7 in (120 mm) guns; 8 × single 6-pdr (2.2 in (57 mm)) guns; 12 × single 3-pdr (1.9 in (47 mm)) guns; 7 × 18 in (450 mm) torpedo tubes
- Armour: Belt: 9–12 in (229–305 mm); Decks: 2–2.5 in (51–64 mm); Barbettes: 5–9 in (127–229 mm); Gunhouses: 6 in (152 mm)

HMS Barfleur was the second and last of the Centurion-class pre-dreadnought battleships built for the Royal Navy in the 1890s. Intended for service abroad, they exchanged heavy armour and a powerful armament for high speed and long range to counter the foreign armoured cruisers then being built as commerce raiders and were rated as second-class battleships.

Barfleur was assigned to the Mediterranean Fleet in 1895 and participated in the blockade of Crete imposed by the Great Powers after a Greek rebellion began on Crete against their Ottoman overlords in February 1897. She joined her sister ship Centurion on the China Station the following year and became the flagship of the station's second-in-command. During the Boxer Rebellion in 1900, both ships contributed landing parties to participate in the Battles of the Taku Forts and of Tientsin.

Already made obsolete by the increasing speeds of the cruisers the ship was designed to defend against, she was placed in reserve in 1904, although Barfleur often participated in the annual fleet manoeuvres. She also served as a flagship in the reserve for several years before the ship was listed for disposal in 1909. After being sold for scrap the following year, Barfleur got jammed underneath the piers of a swing bridge on her way to the scrapyard, forcing it to remain open and blocking traffic while she had to be freed.

== Design and description ==
The Centurion class was designed to meet an Admiralty requirement for ships suitable for use as flagships on the China and Pacific Stations, able to defeat the most powerful foreign ships likely to be encountered there. They had an overall length of 390 feet 9 inches (119.1 m) and a length between perpendiculars of 360 ft (109.7 m), and a beam of 70 feet (21.3 m). Their draught at normal load was 25 ft 8 in (7.82 m) and 26 feet 9 inches (8.2 m) at deep load. The Centurion-class ships displaced 10,634 long tons (10,805 t) at normal load and 11,200 long tons (11,400 t) at deep load. Their steel hulls were sheathed in wood and copper to reduce biofouling. Their crews numbered 620 officers and ratings in 1895 and 600 after they were rebuilt in the early years of the 20th century.

The Centurions were powered by a pair of three-cylinder vertical triple-expansion steam engines, each driving a single propeller, using steam provided by eight coal-fired cylindrical boilers. The engines were designed to produce a total of 9,000 indicated horsepower (6,700 kW) which was intended to allow the ships to make a speed of 17 knots (31 km/h; 20 mph) using natural draught. The engines proved to be slightly more powerful than anticipated and Barfleur reached 17.1 knots (31.7 km/h; 19.7 mph) from 99,934 ihp (74,521 kW) during her sea trials. Using forced draught, she attained 18.54 knots (34.3 km/h; 21.3 mph) from 13,163 ihp (9,816 kW) although this often damaged the boilers and was officially discouraged. The Centurion-class ships had a range of 5,230 nautical miles (9,690 km; 6,020 mi) at 10 knots (19 km/h; 12 mph).

=== Armament and armour ===
The four 32-calibre, breech-loading 10-inch Mk III guns of the main battery were mounted in two twin-gun, circular barbettes, one forward and one aft of the superstructure. Their secondary armament consisted of ten 40-calibre quick-firing (QF) 4.7-inch guns in single mounts. Half a dozen of these guns were mounted on the upper deck, protected by gun shields, and the remaining guns were mounted in casemates in the sides of the hull. Defence against torpedo boats was provided by eight QF six-pounder (2.2-inch (57 mm)) guns (Note: Available sources do not specify the model of gun installed. Judging by production numbers, it most likely the QF 6-pounder Hotchkiss, not the QF 6-pounder Nordenfelt.) and a dozen QF three-pounder (1.9 in (47 mm)) Hotchkiss guns. The ships were also armed with seven 18-inch (Note: The actual diameter of these torpedoes was 17.7 inches (450 mm).) torpedo tubes, two on each broadside and one in the stern above water and one on each broadside underwater.

The Centurion-class ships were mostly fitted with compound armour although some portions were made from improved Harvey armour. Their waterline main belt ranged in thickness from 9 to 12 inches (229 to 305 mm). The armoured deck lay across the top of the waterline belt and consisted of 2 inches (51 mm) of mild steel. Below the waterline, the 2.5-inch (64 mm) lower deck extended from the 5-inch (127 mm) bases of the barbettes to the bow and stern. The barbettes were 8 or 9 inches (203 or 229 mm) thick and the gun crews were protected by an armoured hood or gunhouse that consisted of 6 inches of nickel steel.

== Modifications ==
Gun shields were removed from those guns mounted in the fighting tops between 1897 and 1899. In January 1902, the ship began a reconstruction that exchanged her 4.7-inch guns with 6-inch guns and upgraded their protection. To help compensate for the additional weight, all of her above-water torpedo tubes were removed as was the aft bridge. The remaining three-pounders in the fighting tops were repositioned to the superstructure and the barbette hoods and the foremast was replaced by a signal mast. Despite these measures there was a slight increase in weight that reduced the ship's speed by about 0.25 knots (0.5 km/h; 0.3 mph). In 1906 all of her remaining three-pounders were removed and the mainmast fighting top was modified as a fire-control position.

== Construction and career ==
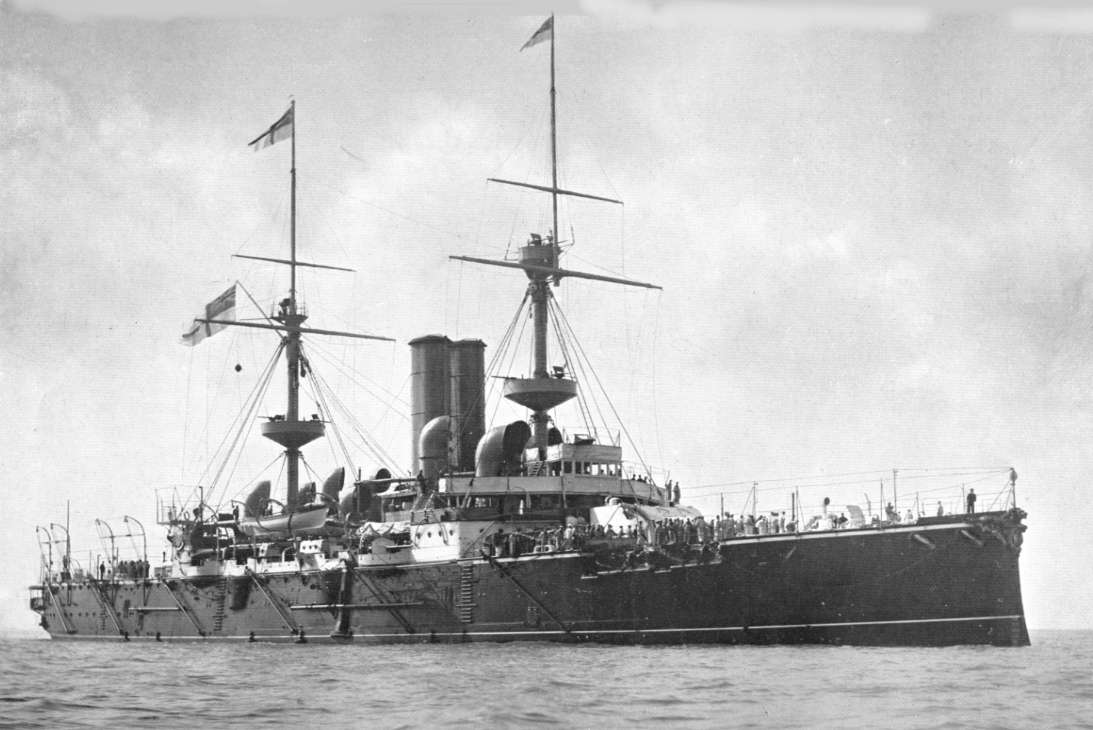
Barfleur before 1898

Named after the 1692 Battle of Barfleur, Barfleur and was the third ship of her name to serve in the Royal Navy. The ship was laid down at HM Dockyard, Chatham on 12 October 1890 and launched on 10 August 1892. She was completed in June 1894 at a cost of £533,666. Barfleur was assigned to the Fleet Reserve on 22 June and was briefly commissioned in July to participate in the annual fleet maneuvers in July and August, before returning to reserve on 1 September.

Barfleur recommissioned on 26 February 1895 for a tour of duty with the Mediterranean Fleet and departed England on 19 March. The ship arrived at Gibraltar on 23 March and relieved the battleship HMS Sans Pareil. She remained at Gibraltar to work up, then proceeded to Malta where she arrived on 27 July to begin her Mediterranean service. She was the British ship on station at Crete when a Greek uprising against rule by the Ottoman Empire broke out there in early 1897, and on 6 February 1897 she put a landing party ashore at Candia (now Heraklion) during a riot to restore order and bring British subjects aboard Barfleur for their safety. Thereafter she became part of the International Squadron, a multinational force made up of warships of the Austro-Hungarian Navy, French Navy, Imperial German Navy, Italian Royal Navy (Regia Marina), Imperial Russian Navy, and Royal Navy which intervened in the uprising to bring fighting to a halt by bombarding Cretan insurgents, putting sailors and marines ashore, and blockading Crete and key ports in Greece. On 15 February 1897, Barfleur contributed a landing party to the International Squadron′s occupation of Crete′s capital, Canea (now Chania).

Barfleur departed Malta for the Far East on 6 February 1898 and arrived at Singapore on 4 March. From there she accompanied the destroyers HMS Fame and HMS Whiting to Hong Kong, where she joined the China Station. On 1 October, Barfleur became the flagship of the station's second-in-command, Rear-Admiral Charles FitzGerald. On 26 October 1899 Captain Sir George Warrender was appointed in command of the ship. FitzGerald was relieved by Rear-Admiral Sir James Bruce on 23 December. During the Boxer Rebellion, the ship put landing parties ashore which joined other forces in storming the Taku forts on 16–17 June 1900 and in relieving the foreign legations at Tientsin on 13–14 July 1900. Commander David Beatty (the future First Sea Lord) was serving aboard Barfleur when he was wounded at Tientsin during operations ashore. In September, the battleship HMS Albion relieved Barfleur as flagship and she became a private ship again. The ship departed Hong Kong on 11 November 1901 and arrived at Plymouth on 31 December 1901.

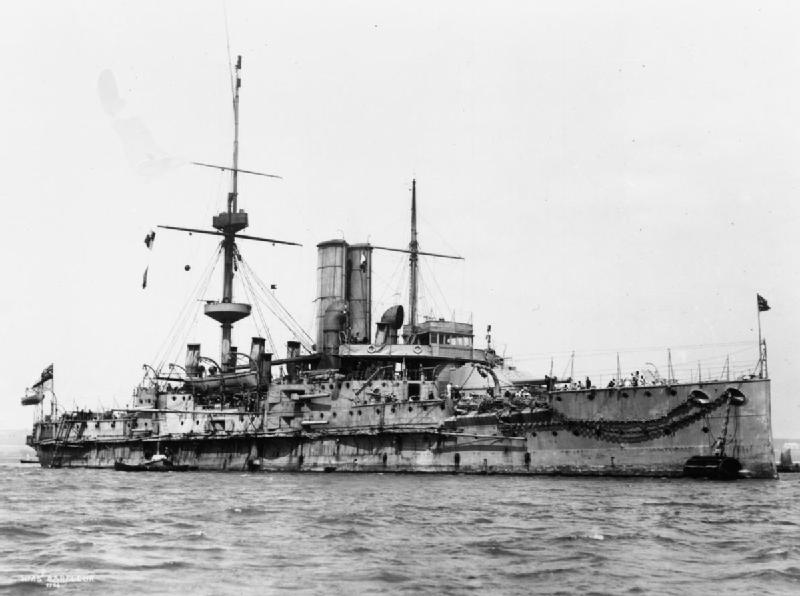
Barfleur at anchor, after 1904

On 22 January 1902, she paid off at HM Dockyard, Devonport to begin a reconstruction at Portsmouth that included a partial rearmament that lasted until May 1904 when she was placed in reserve because she was already obsolete. Barfleur was temporarily recommissioned on 18 July to participate in that year's annual maneuvers. During them she was slightly damaged when she accidentally collided with the battleship HMS Canopus in Mount's Bay on 5 August. After their conclusion, she was paid off again on 8 September. On 21 February 1905, Barfleur recommissioned to take a new crew out to the battleship HMS Vengeance, then serving on the China Station. The two ships rendezvoused at Colombo, Ceylon, on 30 March and Vengeance′s old crew then steamed Barfleur back home. The ship arrived at Portsmouth on 7 May and paid off there two days later. On 10 May, Barfleur recommissioned with a nucleus crew to serve as the flagship of the Rear Admiral, Portsmouth Division of the Reserve Fleet. In June, she took 6 officers and 105 ratings of the London Division of the Royal Naval Volunteer Reserve on a training cruise.

On 28 November, she transferred her crew to the battleship HMS Duncan and received a new nucleus crew. She was refitted in 1905–1906 and took part in the annual maneuvers in June 1906. Barfleur recommissioned for the same service on 20 September 1906. When the Reserve Fleet was absorbed into the new Home Fleet at the end of 1906, the ship remained flagship of the Portsmouth Division. The battleship HMS Prince George relieved her on 4 March 1907 and Barfleur became the parent ship of special service vessels in the Portsmouth Division. The special service vessels were transferred to the 4th Division, Home Fleet, in March 1909 and she ceased her service as their parent ship the following month.

== Disposal ==
In June 1909, Barfleur was listed for sale and towed to the Motherbank, where she was moored awaiting disposal. She was sold on 12 July 1910 for £26,550 to C. Ewen, Glasgow and quickly resold to Bolckow, Vaughan & Co. for demolition at their works at Dunston-on-Tyne. Barfleur had an eventful trip to the scrapyard, going aground on 3 August 1910 in Newcastle upon Tyne between the Swing Bridge and the High Level Bridge while under tow up the River Tyne. As she was not clear of the swing bridge, it could not close and traffic was blocked until some of her deck fittings could be cut away. (She was also reported to have been scrapped at Blyth.)

== Bibliography ==
- Burt, R. A. (2013). British Battleships 1889–1904 (New revised ed.). Annapolis, Maryland: Naval Institute Press. ISBN 978-1-59114-065-8.
- Chesneau, Roger & Kolesnik, Eugene M., eds. (1979). Conway's All the World's Fighting Ships 1860–1905. Greenwich, UK: Conway Maritime Press. ISBN 0-8317-0302-4.
- Colledge, J. J.; Warlow, Ben (2006) [1969]. Ships of the Royal Navy: The Complete Record of All Fighting Ships of the Royal Navy from the 15th Century to the Present (3rd Rev ed.). London: Chatham Publishing. ISBN 978-1-86176-281-8. OCLC 67375475.
- Friedman, Norman (2011). Naval Weapons of World War One. Barnsley, South Yorkshire, UK: Seaforth. ISBN 978-1-84832-100-7.
- Gardiner, Robert & Gray, Randal, eds. (1985). Conway's All the World's Fighting Ships 1906–1921. Annapolis, Maryland: Naval Institute Press. ISBN 0-85177-245-5.
- McTiernan, Mick, A Very Bad Place Indeed For a Soldier. The British involvement in the early stages of the European Intervention in Crete. 1897 - 1898, King's College, London, September 2014.
- Parkes, Oscar (1990). British Battleships (reprint of the 1957 ed.). Annapolis, Maryland: Naval Institute Press. ISBN 1-55750-075-4.
- Seymour, Edward H. (1911). My Naval Career and Travels. New York: E. P. Dutton. OCLC 828933691.
- Silverstone, Paul H. (1984). Directory of the World's Capital Ships. New York: Hippocrene Books. ISBN 0-88254-979-0.
