= 2026–27 Sha Tin SA season =

Sha Tin
2026–27 season
- Owner: Wong Chi Chuen
- Head coach: Kwok Kar Lok (until 16 September); Lee Wai Man (caretaker); Tom Ballantyne (from 6 October)
- Stadium: Sha Tin Sports Ground; Hammer Hill Road Sports Ground; Kai Tak Youth Sports Ground (selected matches)
- Senior Shield: First round (vs. Lee Man)
- Average home league attendance: 1,862
- Biggest win: 3–1 v. Eastern (A); Premier League, 21 August 2026
- Biggest defeat: 0–5 v. North District (A); Premier League, 6 September 2026
Home colours	Away colours

The 2026–27 season is the 25th season in the history of Sha Tin Sports Association and their first-ever season in the Hong Kong Premier League. The club is also competing in the Hong Kong FA Cup, Hong Kong League Cup and the Hong Kong Senior Shield.

The club competes under the sponsored name Supreme Sha Tin, named after its owner and player, Wong Chi Chuen.

On 16 July 2026, Kwok Kar Lok was appointed as the club's new head coach, replacing Lee Wai Man who had undergone a change of role to technical director. On 16 September 2026, after one win in four league games and three losses in a row, Kwok departed the club by mutual consent and was replaced by Lee as caretaker manager. Englishman Tom Ballantyne was subsequently appointed as head coach on 6 October 2026.

== Squad statistics ==
As of match played 22 November 2026

No.	Pos	Nat	Player	Total		Premier League		FA Cup		League Cup		Senior Shield	
No.	Pos	Nat	Player	Apps	Goals	Apps	Goals	Apps	Goals	Apps	Goals	Apps	Goals
1	GK	(Hong Kong) HKG	Wong Tsz Ho	3	0	0	0	0	0	2	0	1	0
3	DF	(Hong Kong) HKG	Wong Chak Ki	2	0	1	0	0	0	0	0	1	0
4	MF	(Hong Kong) HKG	Cheng Chun Wang	7	0	6	0	0	0	1	0	0	0
5	DF	(Hong Kong) HKG	Ng Tsz Chung	2	0	2	0	0	0	0	0	0	0
6	DF	(Brazil) BRA	Mauricio	3	0	1	0	0	0	2	0	0	0
7	FW	(Hong Kong) HKG	Wong Chi Chuen	5	0	2	0	0	0	2	0	1	0
8	FW	(Hong Kong) HKG	Lam Hok Hei	10	2	7	1	0	0	2	1	1	0
9	FW	(Scotland) SCO	James Scott	11	5	8	3	0	0	2	2	1	0
10	MF	(Hong Kong) HKG	Lam Ka Wai	10	0	7	0	0	0	2	0	1	0
11	FW	(Japan) JPN	Hugo Kametani	11	2	8	1	0	0	2	1	1	0
13	MF	(Hong Kong) HKG	Chan Man Fai	1	0	1	0	0	0	0	0	0	0
14	DF	(Brazil) BRA	João Mariano	6	0	4	0	0	0	1	0	1	0
17	MF	(Hong Kong) HKG	Wong Hiu Shan	0	0	0	0	0	0	0	0	0	0
19	MF	(Hong Kong) HKG	Lam Lok Yin	6	0	5	0	0	0	1	0	0	0
20	DF	(Brazil) BRA	Matheus Dantas	5	0	4	0	0	0	1	0	0	0
20	FW	(Hong Kong) HKG	Tong Wan Hei	0	0	0	0	0	0	0	0	0	0
21	MF	(Spain) ESP	David Silva	1	1	1	1	0	0	0	0	0	0
22	DF	(Hong Kong) HKG	So Tsz Yin	5	0	3	0	0	0	1	0	1	0
25	GK	(Hong Kong) HKG	Tong Chung Hei	0	0	0	0	0	0	0	0	0	0
26	DF	(Hong Kong) HKG	Wong Ching Hin	0	0	0	0	0	0	0	0	0	0
28	DF	(Hong Kong) HKG	Lai Hoi To	9	0	7	0	0	0	1	0	1	0
29	FW	(Hong Kong) HKG	Liu Hing Yau	1	0	1	0	0	0	0	0	0	0
30	MF	(Ghana) GHA	Jude Arthur	9	1	6	1	0	0	2	0	1	0
31	DF	(Hong Kong) HKG	Law Tsz Chun (captain)	7	0	6	0	0	0	1	0	0	0
32	MF	(Hong Kong) HKG	Chung Hei Long	0	0	0	0	0	0	0	0	0	0
39	GK	(Hong Kong) HKG	Lau Wai Hon	4	0	4	0	0	0	0	0	0	0
45	DF	(Ghana) GHA	Maxwell Ansah	10	0	8	0	0	0	1	0	1	0
46	DF	(Hong Kong) HKG	Leung Lap Tin	10	0	8	0	0	0	1	0	1	0
47	MF	(Japan) JPN	Seito Takatori	6	0	4	0	0	0	2	0	0	0
66	DF	(Hong Kong) HKG	Lee Chak Shun	0	0	0	0	0	0	0	0	0	0
71	FW	(South Korea) KOR	Park Ye-jun	0	0	0	0	0	0	0	0	0	0
73	MF	(Hong Kong) HKG	Chiu Ching Yu	8	1	6	1	0	0	1	0	1	0
77	DF	(Spain) ESP	Aitor Aldalur	7	0	4	0	0	0	2	0	1	0
91	FW	(Nigeria) NGR	Mahmud Otubu	6	0	3	0	0	0	2	0	1	0
93	GK	(Macau) MAC	Ho Man Fai	4	0	4	0	0	0	0	0	0	0

== Hong Kong Premier League ==
The Premier League fixtures were released on 29 July 2026.

Pos	Team	Pld	W	D	L	GF	GA	GD	Pts	Qualification or relegation
7	HKFC	6	2	1	3	8	14	−6	7	
8	Rangers	10	1	3	6	10	21	−11	6	
9	Kowloon City	7	1	2	4	8	16	−8	5	
10	Sha Tin	7	1	2	4	9	17	−8	5	
11	Eastern	7	1	1	5	10	15	−5	4	Relegation to First Division League

Updated to match(es) played on 21 November 2026. Source: Hong Kong Football Association
Rules for classification: 1) Points; 2) Head-to-head points; 3) Head-to-head goal difference; 4) Head-to-head goals scored; 5) Goal difference; 6) Goals scored; 7) Fair-play points; 8) Drawing lots (Play-off if the winner has to be decided).

Round	1	2	3	4	5	6	7	8	12	11	15	9	10	21	17	16	13	14	18	19	20	22
Ground	A	A	H	H	–	H	A	H	H	H	A	H	H	A	A	–	H	A	H	A	A	A
Result	W	L	L	L	B	D	L	D	L													
Position	2	7	8	9	9	8	10	9	11													
Points	3	3	3	3	3	4	4	5	5													

Source: Hong Kong Football Association
A = Away; H = Home; B = Bye; W = Win; D = Draw; L = Loss

21 August 2026 1	Eastern	1–3	Sha Tin	Mong Kok
20:00 HKT	Okubo 15' (pen.)	Report	Arthur 44'; Scott 52'; Lam Hok Hei 68'	Stadium: Mong Kok Stadium; Attendance: 3,329; Referee: Lau Fong Hei

28 August 2026 2	Lee Man	3–0	Sha Tin	Mong Kok
20:00 HKT	Tursunov 15'; Villalobos 20'; Baffoe 55'	Report		Stadium: Mong Kok Stadium; Attendance: 4,592; Referee: Lau Fong Hei

6 September 2026 3	Sha Tin	0–5	North District	Diamond Hill
16:00 HKT		Report	Granada 8' (pen.); Lo Kong Wai 48'; Kayke David 70'; Vinicius Soares 76', 90+2'	Stadium: Hammer Hill Road Sports Ground; Attendance: 1,621; Referee: Tam Ping Wun

13 September 2026 4	Sha Tin	2–3	Kowloon City	Diamond Hill
16:00 HKT	Kametani 29'; Chiu Ching Yu 54'	Report	Koudakpo 3'; Popović 84'; Diego 90+2'	Stadium: Hammer Hill Road Sports Ground; Attendance: 1,172; Referee: Wong Wai Lun

5	Bye for Sha Tin

18 October 2026 6	Sha Tin	2–2	HKFC	Diamond Hill
16:00 HKT	Scott 28'; Kametani 79'	Report	Benavides 45'; Bleda 45+4'	Stadium: Hammer Hill Road Sports Ground; Attendance: 1,032; Referee: Tang Hing Fu

31 October 2026 7	Eastern District	2–1	Sha Tin	Siu Sai Wan
15:00 HKT	Yuen Chun Him 8'; Renner 76'	Report	Scott 42' (pen.)	Stadium: Siu Sai Wan Sports Ground; Attendance: 928; Referee: Poon Chun Kit

7 November 2026 8	Sha Tin	1–1	Rangers	Kai Tak
15:00 HKT	Silva 56' (pen.)	Report	Ibrahim 65'	Stadium: Kai Tak Youth Sports Ground; Attendance: 4,593; Referee: Yu Kin Fung

22 November 2026 12	Sha Tin	0–3	Eastern	Diamond Hill
15:00 HKT		Report	Alonso 10'; Cova 26'; Okubo 27'	Stadium: Hammer Hill Road Sports Ground; Attendance: 894; Referee: Cheung Wai Lung

13 December 2026 11	Sha Tin	–	Southern	Diamond Hill
15:00 HKT		Report		Stadium: Hammer Hill Road Sports Ground

2 January 2027 15	Kowloon City	–	Sha Tin	Kai Tak
18:00 HKT		Report		Stadium: Kai Tak Youth Sports Ground

10 January 2027 9	Sha Tin	–	Tai Po	Sha Tin
15:00 HKT		Report		Stadium: Sha Tin Sports Ground

31 January 2027 10	Sha Tin	–	Kitchee	Sha Tin
15:00 HKT		Report		Stadium: Sha Tin Sports Ground

3 March 2027 21	Kitchee	–	Sha Tin	Tseung Kwan O
19:45 HKT		Report		Stadium: Tseung Kwan O Sports Ground

7 March 2027 17	HKFC	–	Sha Tin	Happy Valley
16:30 HKT		Report		Stadium: Hong Kong Football Club Stadium

16	Bye for Sha Tin

13 March 2027 13	Sha Tin	–	Lee Man	Sha Tin
15:00 HKT		Report		Stadium: Sha Tin Sports Ground

20 March 2027 14	North District	–	Sha Tin	Sheung Shui
15:00 HKT		Report		Stadium: North District Sports Ground

3 April 2027 18	Sha Tin	–	Eastern District	Sha Tin
15:00 HKT		Report		Stadium: Sha Tin Sports Ground

18 April 2027 19	Rangers	–	Sha Tin	Tsing Yi
15:00 HKT		Report		Stadium: Tsing Yi Sports Ground

24 April 2027 20	Tai Po	–	Sha Tin	Tai Po
15:00 HKT		Report		Stadium: Tai Po Sports Ground

24 April 2027 22	Southern	–	Sha Tin	Aberdeen
15:00 HKT		Report		Stadium: Aberdeen Sports Ground

== Hong Kong FA Cup ==
The FA Cup draw was made on 29 July 2026.

23 January 2027 First round	Kowloon City	–	Sha Tin	Tseung Kwan O
15:00 HKT		Report		Stadium: Tseung Kwan O Sports Ground

== Hong Kong League Cup ==
The League Cup draw was made on 29 July 2026.

1 October 2026 Advancement 1st round	Sha Tin	2–2 (4–5 p)	HKFC	Siu Sai Wan
19:00 HKT	Scott 12'; Lam Hok Hei 67'	Report	Kedwards 10'; Johns 20'	Stadium: Siu Sai Wan Sports Ground; Attendance: 645; Referee: Poon Chun Kit
	Penalties
	Scott (penalty scored); Wong Chi Chuen (penalty scored); Lam Hok Hei (penalty scored); Kametani (penalty scored); Takatori (penalty missed)		(penalty scored) McGunnigle; (penalty scored) Weston; (penalty scored) Kedwards; (penalty scored) Yiu Ho Ming; (penalty scored) Bleda

14 November 2026 Redemption 1st round	Southern	2–2 (2–4 p)	Sha Tin	Siu Sai Wan
18:00 HKT	Kawase 35'; Pereira 84'	Report	Kametani 40'; Scott 56'	Stadium: Siu Sai Wan Sports Ground; Attendance: 588; Referee: Wong Po Sing
	Penalties
	Pereira (penalty missed); Wong Ho Chun (penalty missed); Erins (penalty scored); Poon Pui Hin (penalty missed)		(penalty scored) Lam Hok Hei; (penalty scored) Dantas; (penalty scored) Kametani; (penalty scored) Aldalur

6 December 2026 Redemption 2nd round	Eastern	–	Sha Tin	Tsing Yi
18:00 HKT		Report		Stadium: Tsing Yi Sports Ground

== Hong Kong Senior Shield ==
The Senior Shield draw was made on 29 July 2026.

19 September 2026 First round	Sha Tin	0–1	Lee Man	Aberdeen
16:00 HKT		Report	Yung Hui To 66'	Stadium: Aberdeen Sports Ground; Attendance: 432; Referee: Yu Kin Fung
