= 1896–97 Hongkong Challenge Shield =

Tournament details
- Country: Hong Kong

Final positions
- Champions: H.M.S. Centurion (1st title)
- Runners-up: Kowloon

1896–97 Hongkong Challenge Shield was the inaugural season of Hong Kong Challenge Shield, the now existing oldest football tournament in Asia.

== Fixtures and results ==
=== First round ===
The draw of first round was made on 4 December 1896.

Team 1	Score	Team 2	Date & time	Venue	Referee	Notes
H Company, 14th Regiment	1–1	D Company, 14th Regiment	1896-12-29 16:00	Happy Valley	P. G. Davies (R.A.)	
Hongkong Colts	1–1	35th Company, S.D., R.A.	1897-01-06 16:00	Happy Valley		
Hongkong Football Club	3–0	12th Company, R.A.	1897-01-09 16:00	Happy Valley	J. Henderson	
Hongkong Colts	1–0	35th Company, S.D., R.A.	1897-01-15 16:15	Happy Valley	D. Wood	Rematch; The match was scheduled playing on 11 January 1897, but later was postponed due to bad state of the ground.
H.M.S. Narcissus		Kowloon				
B Company, 14th Regiment		Officers, 14th Regiment				

=== Second round ===
The draw of second round was made on 11 January 1897.

Team 1	Score	Team 2	Date & time	Venue	Referee	Notes
H.M.S. Centurion	1–1	Hongkong Football Club	1897-01-21 16:30	Happy Valley	J. W. L. Oliver	
Hongkong Colts	0–2	Royal Engineers	1897-02-13 16:15	Happy Valley	A. E. M. Head (R.A.)	
B Company, W.Y.R.	1–2	Kowloon	1897-02-27 16:00	Happy Valley	A. E. M. Head (R.A.)	
A Company, W.Y.R.		D Company, W.Y.R.				

=== Semi-finals ===
The draw of semi-finals was made on 1 March 1897.

Team 1	Score	Team 2	Date & time	Venue	Referee	Notes
A Company, W.Y.R.	0–3	Kowloon	1897-03-06 16:00	Happy Valley	J. W. L. Oliver	
H.M.S. Centurion	4–1	Royal Engineers	1897-03-13 16:00	Happy Valley	P. G. Davies (R.A.)	

=== Final ===
The match was scheduled playing on 20 March 1897, but later was postponed to 23 March 1897.

1897-03-23
16:00

Kowloon	1–2	H.M.S. Centurion

Happy Valley
Referee: P. G. Davies (Royal Artillery)

GK	Moore
DF	Robinson
DF	Gambion
MF	Egan
MF	Wilson
MF	Henderson (c)
FW	Symington
FW	Gow
FW	MacSwayed
FW	Sutherland
FW	Simpson

GK	Greenwood (R.M.A.)
DF	W. Chambers (A.B.) (c)
DF	H. Stirland (A.B.)
MF	W. Street (A.B.)
MF	S. Hardy (A.B.)
MF	D. Allan (leading seaman)
FW	F. Richards (R.M.A.)
FW	Steel
FW	J. Dalton (A.B.)
FW	P. Buchanan (A.B.)
FW	A. Mayes (A.B.)
