= HMS Renown (1895) =

British predreadnought battleship

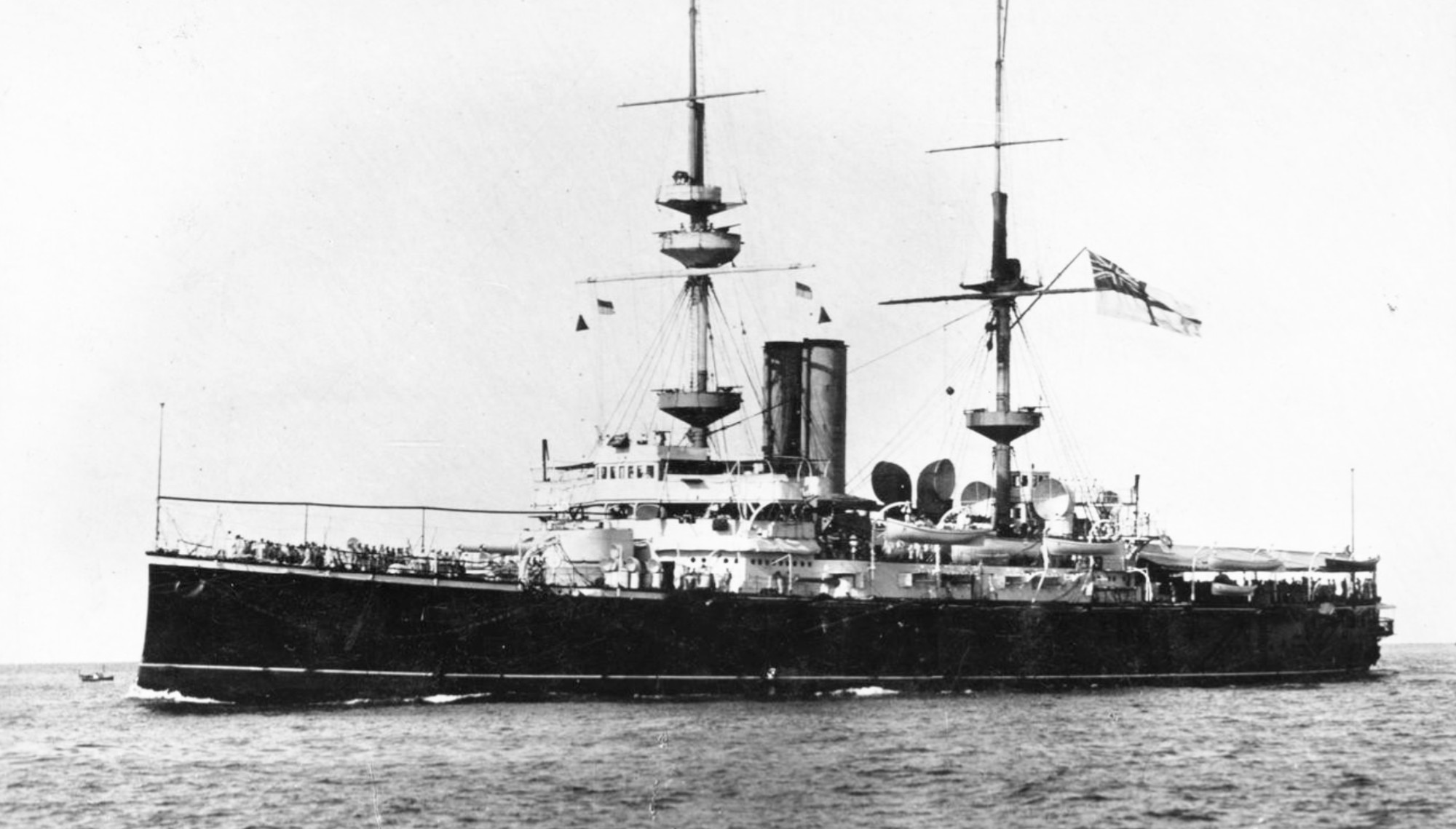

Class overview
- Operators: Royal Navy
- Preceded by: Centurion class
- Succeeded by: Majestic class
- Built: 1893–1897
- In service: 1897–1913
- Planned: 1
- Completed: 1
- Scrapped: 1

History

United Kingdom
- Name: Renown
- Builder: Pembroke Dockyard
- Laid down: 1 February 1893
- Launched: 8 May 1895
- Completed: January 1897
- Decommissioned: 31 January 1913
- Stricken: 31 January 1913
- Nickname(s): "The Battleship Yacht"
- Fate: Sold for scrap, 1 April 1914

General characteristics
- Type: Pre-dreadnought battleship
- Displacement: 12,865 long tons (13,071 t) (deep load)
- Length: 412 ft 3 in (125.7 m) (o.a.)
- Beam: 72 ft 4 in (22.0 m)
- Draught: 27 ft 3 in (8.3 m) (deep load)
- Installed power: 8 cylindrical boilers; 10,000 ihp (7,500 kW)
- Propulsion: 2 shafts; 2 Triple-expansion steam engines
- Speed: 19 knots (35 km/h; 22 mph)
- Range: 8,500 nmi (15,700 km; 9,800 mi) at 15 knots (28 km/h; 17 mph)
- Complement: 651–674
- Armament: 2 twin × 10 in (254 mm) guns; 10 × single 6 in (152 mm) guns; 12 × single 12 pdr (3 in (76 mm)) guns; 12 × single 3 pdr (47 mm (1.9 in)) guns; 5 × 18 in (450 mm) torpedo tubes
- Armour: Harvey armour; Belt: 6–8 in (152–203 mm); Deck: 2–3 in (51–76 mm); Barbettes: 10 in (254 mm); Gun turrets: 3–6 in (76–152 mm); Conning tower: 3–9 in (76–229 mm); Bulkheads: 6–10 in (152–254 mm)

HMS Renown was a second-class predreadnought battleship built for the Royal Navy in the early 1890s. Intended to command cruiser squadrons operating on foreign stations, the ship served as the flagship of the North America and West Indies Station and the Mediterranean Fleet early in her career. Becoming obsolete as cruiser speeds increased, Renown became a royal yacht and had all of her secondary armament removed to make her more suitable for such duties. She became a stoker's training ship in 1909 and was listed for disposal in 1913. The ship was sold for scrap in early 1914.

== Design and description ==
Production of a new 12-inch gun was behind schedule and the three battleships planned for the 1892 Naval Programme that were intended to use the new gun had to be delayed. In their stead, an improved Centurion-class battleship design was chosen to keep the workers at Pembroke Dockyard fully employed. No formal requirement for a second-class battleship suitable for use as the flagship on foreign stations or to reinforce cruiser squadrons existed at the time, but the decision to build the ship was strongly influenced by the views of the Controller of the Navy, Rear Admiral John A. "Jacky" Fisher and the Director of Naval Intelligence, Captain Cyprian Bridge who favoured smaller ships with a smaller main armament and large secondary armament. They pressed for additional ships of this type as substitutes for the two other battleships originally programmed, but this was rejected by the Admiralty as there was no demand for additional second-class battleships.

The Director of Naval Construction, William Henry White, submitted three designs in early April 1892 and the smallest one was chosen on 11 April. The design was quite innovative in several different ways. It was the first battleship to use Harvey armour, which allowed the secondary casemates to be armoured, the first to use a sloping armour deck and the first to provide armoured shields over the main armament.

=== General characteristics ===
Renown had an overall length of 412 feet 3 inches (125.7 m), a beam of 72 feet 4 inches (22.0 m), and a draught of 27 feet 3 inches (8.3 m) at deep load. She displaced 11,690 long tons (11,880 t) at normal load and 12,865 long tons (13,071 t) at deep load. The ship had a metacentric height of 3.75 feet (1.1 m) at deep load.

In 1903, the crew numbered between 651 and 674 officers and ratings. She was considered to handle well by her captains and was a good sea-boat. In view of her intended duties abroad, her bottom was coppered to reduce biofouling.

=== Propulsion ===
Renown was powered by a pair of three-cylinder vertical triple-expansion steam engines, each driving a single propeller. Steam for the engines was provided by eight cylindrical boilers at a working pressure of 155 psi (1,069 kPa; 11 kgf/cm^{2}). The engines were designed to produce a total of 10,000 indicated horsepower (7,500 kW) which was intended to allow her to reach a speed of 17 knots (31 km/h; 20 mph). The engines proved to be more powerful than anticipated and Renown reached 18.75 knots (34.73 km/h; 21.58 mph) during sea trials under forced draught. The ship carried a maximum of 1,890 long tons (1,920 t) of coal, enough to steam 6,400 nautical miles (11,900 km; 7,400 mi) at 10 knots (19 km/h; 12 mph).

=== Armament ===
She was armed with four 32-calibre, breech-loading 10-inch (254 mm) Mk III guns in two twin-gun barbettes, one forward and one aft. Each gun was provided with 105 shells. Her secondary armament consisted of ten 40-calibre quick-firing (QF) 6-inch (152 mm) Mk II guns. Half a dozen of these guns were mounted in casemates on the sides of the hull and the remaining guns were mounted on the upper deck in casemates in the superstructure. Defence against torpedo boats was provided by a dozen QF 12-pounder (3 in (76 mm)) 12 cwt guns. (Note: "cwt" is the abbreviation for hundredweight, 12 cwt referring to the weight of the gun.) Eight of these were mounted on the upper deck amidships. They fired 12.5-pound (5.7 kg) shells at a muzzle velocity of 2,548 ft/s (777 m/s). 200 rounds per gun were carried by each ship. Renown also carried eight QF 3-pounder (47 mm (1.9 in)) Hotchkiss guns. Each gun was provided with 500 rounds of ammunition. She had five 18-inch (Note: The actual diameter of these torpedoes was 17.7 inches (450 mm).) torpedo tubes, one in the stern above water and two on each broadside underwater.

=== Armour ===
The ship's protection was generally composed of Harvey armour and her waterline main belt was 6–8 inches (152–203 mm) thick. It was 210 feet (64.0 m) long amidships and 7.5 feet (2.3 m) high of which 5 feet (1.5 m) was below the waterline at normal load. Fore and aft oblique bulkheads, 10 inches (254.0 mm) and 6 inches (152 mm)] thick, connected the belt armour to the barbettes. The upper strake of six-inch armour was 180 feet (54.9 m) long and 6.75 feet (2.1 m) high. It covered the ship's side between the rear of the barbettes up to the level of the main deck. Oblique bulkheads six inches thick connected the upper armour to the barbettes.

Renown was the first British battleship to be built with a sloped armoured deck behind the main belt as was commonly used on British protected cruisers. The top of the protective deck was even with the top of the main armoured belt and sloped down at 45° angle to meet the bottom of the belt. It was 2 inches (51 mm) thick on the flat and 3 inches (76 mm) on the slope and ran between the barbettes. Outside the barbettes, the lower deck was three inches thick and ran towards the ends of the ship.

The barbettes were protected by 10-inch (254 mm) armour plates. The gun turrets that protected the main armament were six inches thick on their face, with three-inch sides and a 1-inch (25 mm) roof. They were initially built without a rear plate because of weight distribution problems with the turrets. The upper deck casemates were protected by 4-inch (102 mm) plates on the front and sides, but the main deck casemates had six-inch faces and sides. The stern torpedo tube was protected by a mantlet three to six inches thick. The sides of the forward conning tower were 9 inches (229 mm) thick while those of the rear conning tower were only three inches in thickness.

== Construction and career ==
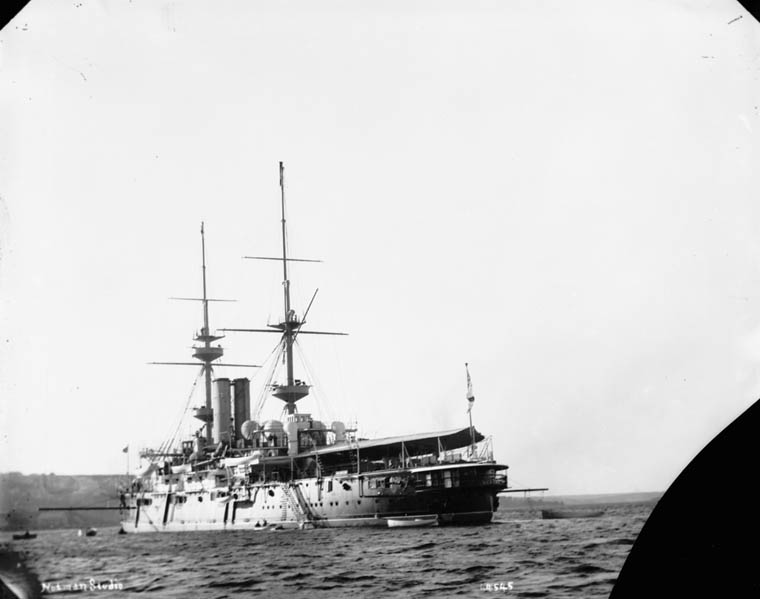
HMS Renown, flagship of the North America and West Indies Station, at Halifax circa 1898

Renown was laid down at Pembroke Dockyard on 1 February 1893 and launched on 8 May 1895. She was completed in January 1897 at a cost of £751,206, but then underwent lengthy sea trials that included the changing of her propeller blades that lasted until June. The ship commissioned on 8 June 1897 and served as flagship for the Commander-in-Chief, Vice Admiral Sir Nowell Salmon, VC, on 26 June, at the Fleet Review at Spithead for the Diamond Jubilee of Queen Victoria, with the Prince of Wales aboard. She was briefly attached to the 1st Division, of the Channel Squadron, from 7 to 12 July for manoeuvres off the south coast of Ireland. On 24 August, Renown became Fisher's flagship, relieving the protected cruiser Crescent as flagship of the North America and West Indies Station. The ship continued as such until beginning a refit in May 1899.

Upon completion of her refit in July, she transferred to the Mediterranean Fleet, once again becoming Fisher's flagship. A strong proponent of the design of Renown, Fisher also found her highly desirable for the hosting of the social events required of a flagship in peacetime. Captain Hugh Tyrwhitt was appointed in command on 19 March 1900. Renown also underwent a special refit at Malta from February to May 1900 to meet Fisher's requirements for her. This included the transfer of the main deck 12-pounders to the superstructure. The ship recommissioned on 19 November 1900, and served as flagship until Fisher ended his tour as Commander-in-Chief on 4 June 1902, after which she continued to serve in the Mediterranean Fleet as a private ship under a new captain, Arthur Murray Farquhar. Renown participated in combined manoeuvres off Cephalonia and Morea between 29 September and 6 October 1902.

After the manoeuvres ended, she was detached from the Mediterranean Fleet and returned to the United Kingdom to be specially fitted out at Portsmouth to carry the Duke and Duchess of Connaught on a royal tour of India. These modifications included removal of the main deck six-inch guns. After the modifications, she was nicknamed the "Battleship Yacht." Renown carried the Duke and Duchess on their royal tour of India from November 1902 to March 1903. The ship rejoined the Mediterranean Fleet in April. In August, she relieved Venerable as flagship of the fleet so that the latter ship could undergo a refit. From 5 to 9 August 1903, Renown participated in manoeuvres off the coast of Portugal. (Note: A full account of her 1900–1904 commission is to be found in the Westminster Press's Log Series No 8. Written by Chas. Mitchell, R.M.L.I., it also contains "numerous special articles by Tre-Pol-Pen", the pen-name of the ship's then Engineer Sub-Lieutenant, Barry Hocken (who, as a serving officer, was not allowed to write under his own name).)

Renown was placed into reserve at Devon on 15 May 1904, although she participated in manoeuvres the following month. On 21 February 1905, the ship began a special refit at Portsmouth to configure her as a royal yacht. During the refit, the remainder of her secondary armament was removed to increase her accommodations. On 8 October, Renown left Portsmouth bound for Genoa, Italy. At Genoa, the Prince and Princess of Wales—the future King George V and Queen Mary—embarked for a royal tour of India. The first-class protected cruiser Terrible escorted the ship during the tour. At the conclusion of the tour, Renown departed Karachi on 23 March 1906 and arrived at Portsmouth on 7 May. She was placed into reserve on 31 May.

In May 1907, Renown was attached to the Home Fleet as a "subsidiary yacht". Between October and December 1907, Renown carried King Alfonso XIII and Queen Victoria Eugenia of Spain on an official trip to and from the United Kingdom. The ship was transferred to the 4th Division, Home Fleet, at Portsmouth on 1 April 1909. Five months later, 25 September, she began a refit in Portsmouth Dockyard to convert her for use as a stoker's training ship.

Renown briefly served as a tender to HMS Victory in October before her refit was completed in November. During the Coronation Review at Spithead on 24 June 1911 for King George V, the ship was used as an accommodation ship. She was slightly damaged when water tanker Aid rammed her on 26 November 1911. Renown was offered for sale on 31 January 1913 and partially dismantled. In December 1913, she was moored at the Motherbank, awaiting disposal. On 1 April 1914 she was sold at auction (Note: Auction was held at HM Dockyard, Portsmouth and included the condition that the ship must be broken-up) to Hughes Bolckow for scrap at a price of £39,000. She was broken up at Blyth.
