= 1955–56 Hong Kong Senior Shield =

Tournament details
- Country: Hong Kong

Final positions
- Champions: Eastern (3rd title)
- Runners-up: Kitchee

1955–56 Hong Kong Senior Shield was the 11th edition of Hong Kong Senior Shield after World War II.

== Final ==
1956-03-24
16:45

Eastern	2 – 1	Kitchee
Lee Ping Chui 70'; Chu Wing Keung 73'		Lam Sheung Yee 64'

Government Stadium
Attendance: 24,500
Referee: Dawson
