= 1945–46 Hong Kong Challenge Shield =

Tournament details
- Country: Hong Kong

Final positions
- Champions: Royal Navy B (1st title)
- Runners-up: No. 1 Commando

1945–46 Hong Kong Challenge Shield (known as Sincere Perfumery Co. Shield for sponsorship reasons) was the first edition of Hong Kong Challenge Shield after World War II.

== Fixture and results ==
=== Second round (quarter-finals) ===
The draw result was printed on 7 March 1946 on The China Mail.

Team 1	Score	Team 2	Date & time	Venue	Referee	Notes
Royal Navy A	1–3	Royal Navy B	1946-03-09 14:30	Navy Ground	Opl. R. Leigh	
44 R.M. Commandos	5–1	R.A.F.	1946-03-09 16:00	Navy Ground	K. K. Ip	
No. 1 Commandos	4–1	781 Coy. R.A.S.C.	1946-03-10 14:30	Navy Ground	A. McCorkindale	
No. 5 Commandos	2–4	Eastern	1946-03-10 16:00	Navy Ground	C.P.O. J. Rogers	

=== Semi-finals ===
Team 1	Score	Team 2	Date & time	Venue	Referee	Notes
No. 1 Commandos	3–2	44 R.M. Commandos	1946-03-23			
Eastern	0–4 (Match abandoned)	Royal Navy B	1946-03-24	Causeway Bay	Opl. R. Leigh	The game was abandoned seven minutes before the end owing to crowd encroaching on the ground. Royal Navy B was heading four goals before abandonment and was awarded a win.

== Final ==
1946-04-20

Royal Navy B	3–3 (a.e.t.)	No. 1 Commandos

Causeway Bay

=== Replay ===
1946-04-27

Royal Navy B	4–3 (a.e.t.)	No. 1 Commandos

Causeway Bay
