= Hong Kong Senior Shield =

Association football tournament in Hong Kong

- Founded: 1895 (as Hong Kong Football Cup); 1896 (as Hong Kong Challenge Shield)
- Region: Hong Kong
- Teams: 11
- Current champions: Tai Po (2nd title)
- Most championships: South China (31 titles)
- 2026–27 Hong Kong Senior Shield

The Hong Kong Senior Shield (Chinese: 香港高級組銀牌), known commonly as the Senior Shield, is the football knockout inter-club competition held in Hong Kong and the fourth oldest football tournament in Asia. The winners of the competition receive HK$80,000 in prize money, while the runners-up receive HK$40,000.

The current Senior Shield holders are Tai Po.

== History ==
Hong Kong Football Cup was a knockout cup competition which was established in 1895. It had been renamed to Hong Kong Challenge Shield due to the changes of the trophy. It had been divided in Senior Shield and Junior Shield since 1922–23 season. The knockout format has been used except in 1982–83 and 1996–97 seasons. In 1982–83, group matches format was used. In 1996-1997, a double knock-out system were used. Before 1978, a re-match would be played after a draw. After 1978, extra time and penalty kicks were used. Penalty shoot-out has been used for 3 times in the final in history (1988, 1994, 1995). In 2011–12 and 2012–13 season, the competition was transformed to a two-legged home-and-away ties format.

Lee Kin Wo is the player who has won the most number of Senior Shield. He won it for 10 times between 1987 and 2005. (Eastern: 1987, 1993, 1994; South China: 1996, 1997, 1999, 2000, 2002, 2003; Sun Hei: 2005). Ho Ying Fan and Wu Kwok Hung have won the competition for 9 times.

There are 3 teams after World War II which won Senior Shield immediately after their promotions to First Division League. They are Rangers (1966), Jardine (1969) and Seiko (1973).

In 1987–1988, it was the first time to have external sponsor for the competition. Camel Paints sponsored the competition for 6 consecutive years. In 1993–1994, the sponsor was Emperor Financial Services Group. In 2003–2004 and 2004–2005, Sunray Cave was the sponsor and the most recent sponsor is Choi Fung Hong.

One of the most unexpected results in the competition history is a 6–5 win by Army against Happy Valley in 1965. At the time, Army was at the bottom of the First Division League and had to relegate to the Second Division next season while Happy Valley was the league Champion.

== Trivia ==
In 1981–82, Eastern invited English football legend Bobby Moore to play in the final. The 40-year-old famous player played for 12 minutes only in the match, which Eastern beat Rangers by 4–0.

== Finals ==
=== Key ===
(R)	Replay
(1)	First leg
(2)	Second leg
*	Match went to extra time
^	Match went to extra time with golden goal
†	Match decided by a penalty shootout after extra time

=== Results ===
Edition	Season	Winners	Score	Runners-up	Venue	Attendance
1	1896–97	HMS Centurion	2–1	Kowloon	Happy Valley	2,000–3,000
2	1897–98	G Coy., King's Own Regiment	3–0	25th Coy. S.D., R.A.		
3	1898–99	HKFC	1–0	38th Coy. S.D., R.A.		
4	1899–1900	Royal Welch Fus.Co. G	3–1	Royal Welch Fus.Co. H		
5	1900–01	R.G.A.	6–0	Royal Welch Fus.Co. H		
6	1901–02	Royal Welch Fus.	3–2	HMS Glory		
7	1902–03	HMS Glory	2–1	Argonauts	Hong Kong Football Club Stadium	~5,000
8	1903–04	HMS Albion	3–0	HMS Cressy	Hong Kong Football Club Stadium	
9	1904–05	Royal West Kent Regt.	2–0	HMS Glory	Hong Kong Football Club Stadium	~4,000
10	1905–06	HMS Diadem	2–0	HKFC	Hong Kong Football Club Stadium	
11	1906–07	R.G.A.	3–2	HKFC	Hong Kong Football Club Stadium	
12	1907–08	HKFC	2–1	HMS Bedford	Hong Kong Football Club Stadium	
13	1908–09	HMS Bedford	4–3	Buffs	Hong Kong Football Club Stadium	
14	1909–10	Buffs	4–1	Naval Yard	Hong Kong Football Club Stadium	
15	1910–11	Naval Yard	2–0	K.O.Y.L.I.	Hong Kong Football Club Stadium	
16	1911–12	K.O.Y.L.I.	5–0	Naval Yard	Hong Kong Football Club Stadium	
17	1912–13	Royal Engineers	5–0	D.C.L.I.	Hong Kong Football Club Stadium	
18	1913–14	R.G.A.	13–1	HMS Hampshire	Hong Kong Football Club Stadium	~5,000
19	1914–15	Royal Engineers	2–0	HKFC	Hong Kong Football Club Stadium	
20	1915–16	HKFC	1–0	Royal Engineers	Hong Kong Football Club Stadium	
21	1918–19	HKFC	1–0	South China	Hong Kong Football Club Stadium	
22	1919–20	Police	3–1	St. Joseph's	Hong Kong Football Club Stadium	
23	1920–21	HMS Titania	4–2	R.G.A.	Hong Kong Football Club Stadium	
24	1921–22	HKFC	2–0	R.G.A.		
25	1922–23	Kowloon	2–1	The King's Liverpool Regiment		
26	1923–24	East Surrey Regiment	3–1	Kowloon		
27	1924–25	Kowloon	4–2	Police	Hong Kong Football Club Stadium	
28	1925–26	Kowloon	3–2	East Surrey Regiment		
29	1926–27	The King's Own Borderers	2–0	Kowloon		
30	1927–28	Kowloon	2–1	Police		
31	1928–29	South China	5–0	Kowloon		
32	1929–30	Somerset Light Infantry	2–1	Royal Navy		
33	1930–31	South China	6–1	South Wales Borderers	Hong Kong Football Club Stadium	
34	1931–32	South Wales Borderers	3–2	HKFC		
35	1932–33	South China	3–1	South Wales Borderers		
36	1933–34	South Wales Borderers	3–0	South China		
37	1934–35	South China B	2–1	Police		
38	1935–36	South China A	2–1	Police	Hong Kong Football Club Stadium	
39	1936–37	South China	2–0	Wiltshire Regiment	Hong Kong Football Club Stadium	
40	1937–38	South China A	3–0	South China B		
41	1938–39	South China	5–3	Police		
42	1939–40	Eastern	3–2	South China A		
43	1940–41	South China	2–0	Royal Navy		
44	1945–46	Royal Navy B	3–3 *	No. 1 Commando	Causeway Bay	
44	1945–46 (R)	Royal Navy B	4–3 *	No. 1 Commando	Causeway Bay	
45	1946–47	Sing Tao	4–1	South China	Causeway Bay	
46	1947–48	Sing Tao	1–0	Eastern	Hong Kong Football Club Stadium	
47	1948–49	South China A	5–3	Kitchee	Hong Kong Football Club Stadium	
48	1949–50	Kitchee	1–0	St. Joseph's	Hong Kong Football Club Stadium	
49	1950–51	KMB	2–1	South China		
50	1951–52	Sing Tao	1–0	Kitchee		
51	1952–53	Eastern	2–1	South China		
52	1953–54	Kitchee	3–2	KMB		
53	1954–55	South China	6–1	Army		
54	1955–56	Eastern	2–1	Kitchee	Government Stadium	24,500
55	1956–57	South China	6–2	KMB		
56	1957–58	South China	3–0	KMB		
57	1958–59	South China	4–2	Tung Wah		
58	1959–60	Kitchee	5–3	Tung Wah		
59	1960–61	South China	4–0	Tung Wah		
60	1961–62	South China	3–0	Police		
61	1962–63	Kwong Wah	2–1	South China		
62	1963–64	Kitchee	1–0	KMB		
63	1964–65	South China	4–2	Yuen Long		
64	1965–66	Rangers	1–0	Police		
65	1966–67	Sing Tao	2–0	Happy Valley	Government Stadium	27,000
66	1967–68	Yuen Long	2–0	Tung Sing	Government Stadium	14,051
67	1968–69	Jardine	4–2	Police	Government Stadium	12,787
68	1969–70	Sing Tao	1–1	Fire Services	Government Stadium	27,238
68	1969–70 (R)	Sing Tao	2–0	Fire Services	Government Stadium	6,335
69	1970–71	Rangers	3–2	South China	Government Stadium	25,061
70	1971–72	South China	2–1	Eastern	Government Stadium	28,286
71	1972–73	Seiko	2–1	Tung Sing	Government Stadium	28,330
72	1973–74	Seiko	3–1	South China	Government Stadium	28,351
73	1974–75	Rangers	2–0	Urban Services	Government Stadium	6,261
74	1975–76	Seiko	2–0	Rangers	Government Stadium	28,258
75	1976–77	Seiko	2–1	South China	Government Stadium	28,137
76	1977–78	Happy Valley	3–2	Seiko	Government Stadium	28,079
77	1978–79	Seiko	4–2	South China	Government Stadium	28,104
78	1979–80	Seiko	3–1	Bulova	Government Stadium	13,067
79	1980–81	Seiko	4–2	Sea Bee	Government Stadium	28,210
80	1981–82	Eastern	4–0	Rangers	Government Stadium	24,155
81	1982–83	Happy Valley	3–2	Seiko	Government Stadium	8,954
82	1983–84	Bulova	0–0	Happy Valley	Government Stadium	10,859
82	1983–84 (R)	Bulova	2–0	Happy Valley	Government Stadium	6,469
83	1984–85	Seiko	1–0	Happy Valley	Government Stadium	17,480
84	1985–86	South China	3–0	Sea Bee	Government Stadium	27,859
85	1986–87	Eastern	2–0	Tsuen Wan	Government Stadium	4,971
86	1987–88	South China	5–2	Happy Valley	Government Stadium	15,215
87	1988–89	South China	2–0	Tsuen Wan	Government Stadium	10,256
88	1989–90	Happy Valley	2–1	South China	Government Stadium	25,330
89	1990–91	South China	1–0	Lai Sun	Government Stadium	21,915
90	1991–92	Sing Tao	1–1	Instant-Dict	Government Stadium	14,024
90	1991–92 (R)	Sing Tao	2–1	Instant-Dict	Government Stadium	7,675
91	1992–93	Eastern	4–0	South China		
92	1993–94	Eastern	6–5	Instant-Dict		
93	1994–95	Rangers	2–2 †	Happy Valley		
94	1995–96	South China	2–1	Sun Hei		
95	1996–97 (1)	South China	3–1	Instant-Dict		
95	1996–97 (2)	South China	1–0	Instant-Dict		
96	1997–98	Happy Valley	1–0	Sing Tao		
97	1998–99	South China	2–0	Sing Tao		
98	1999–2000	South China	4–3	Happy Valley		
99	2000–01	Orient & Yee Hope Union	1–0	Instant-Dict	Hong Kong Stadium	5,784
100	2001–02	South China	3–2	Sun Hei	Mong Kok Stadium	1,734
101	2002–03	South China	2–1 ^	Happy Valley	Mong Kok Stadium	3,666
102	2003–04	Happy Valley	3–0	Sun Hei	Mong Kok Stadium	1,977
103	2004–05	Sun Hei	4–2	Happy Valley	Hong Kong Stadium	1,493
104	2005–06	Kitchee	3–0	Happy Valley	Mong Kok Stadium	2,217
105	2006–07	South China	2–1	Sun Hei	Hong Kong Stadium	4,980
106	2007–08	Eastern	3–1	Kitchee	Hong Kong Stadium	2,493
107	2008–09	Pegasus	3–0	Sun Hei	Hong Kong Stadium	2,828
108	2009–10	South China	4–2	Kitchee	Siu Sai Wan Sports Ground	2,760
109	2010–11	Citizen	3–3 †	South China	Hong Kong Stadium	4,694
110	2011–12	Sun Hei	1–1 †	South China	Hong Kong Stadium	6,234
111	2012–13	Tai Po	2–2 †	Citizen	Hong Kong Stadium	3,294
112	2013–14	South China	2–1	Pegasus	Hong Kong Stadium	6,820
113	2014–15	Eastern	3–2	Kitchee	Hong Kong Stadium	6,133
114	2015–16	Eastern	2–0	Southern	Hong Kong Stadium	4,558
115	2016–17	Kitchee	2–1	Eastern	Hong Kong Stadium	6,216
116	2017–18	Yuen Long	3–0	Eastern	Hong Kong Stadium	3,711
117	2018–19	Kitchee	3–2	Tai Po	Hong Kong Stadium	3,399
118	2019–20	Eastern	2–0	Lee Man	Mong Kok Stadium	0
	2020–21	Cancelled due to COVID-19 pandemic in Hong Kong				
	2021–22	Cancelled due to COVID-19 pandemic in Hong Kong				
119	2022–23	Kitchee	1–1 †	Eastern	Hong Kong Stadium	7,192
120	2023–24	Kitchee	2–1 *	Eastern	Mong Kok Stadium	4,570
121	2024–25	Eastern	1–0	Lee Man	Mong Kok Stadium	4,495
122	2025–26	Tai Po	4–1 *	Rangers	Mong Kok Stadium	4,738
123	2026–27					

== Results by team ==
Teams shown in italics are no longer in existence in Hong Kong football league system.

Club	Wins	Last Final Won	Runners-up	Last Final Lost
South China	31	2013–14	16	2011–12
Eastern	12	2024–25	6	2023–24
Kitchee	9	2023–24	6	2014–15
Seiko	8	1984–85	2	1982–83
Sing Tao	6	1991–92	2	1998–99
Happy Valley	5	2003–04	10	2005–06
HKFC	5	1921–22	4	1931–32
Kowloon	5	1927–28	4	1928–29
Rangers	4	1994–95	3	2025–26
R.G.A.	3	1913–14	1	1921–22
Sun Hei	2	2011–12	5	2008–09
Royal Welch Fus.	2	1901–02	2	1900–01
South Wales Borderers	2	1933–34	2	1932–33
Royal Engineers	2	1914–15	1	1915–16
Yuen Long	2	2017–18	1	1964–65
Tai Po	2	2025–26	1	2018–19
Police	1	1919–20	8	1968–69
KMB	1	1950–51	4	1963–64
HMS Glory	1	1902–03	2	1904–05
Naval Yard	1	1910–11	2	1911–12
Royal Navy	1	1945–46	2	1940–41
HMS Centurion	1	1896–97	1	1895–96
HMS Bedford	1	1908–09	1	1907–08
Buffs	1	1909–10	1	1908–09
K.O.Y.L.I.	1	1911–12	1	1910–11
East Surrey Regiment	1	1923–24	1	1925–26
Bulova	1	1983–84	1	1979–80
Citizen	1	2010–11	1	2012–13
Pegasus	1	2008–09	1	2013–14
G Coy., King's Own Regiment	1	1897–98	–	–
HMS Albion	1	1903–04	–	–
Royal West Kent Regt.	1	1904–05	–	–
HMS Diadem	1	1905–06	–	–
HMS Titania	1	1920–21	–	–
The King's Own Borderers	1	1926–27	–	–
Somerset Light Infantry	1	1929–30	–	–
Kwong Wah	1	1962–63	–	–
Jardine	1	1968–69	–	–
Yee Hope	1	2000–01	–	–
Instant-Dict	–	–	4	2000–01
Tung Wah	–	–	3	1960–61
St. Joseph's	–	–	2	1949–50
Tung Sing	–	–	2	1972–73
Sea Bee	–	–	2	1985–86
Tsuen Wan	–	–	2	1988–89
Lee Man	–	–	2	2024–25
25th Coy. S.D., R.A.	–	–	1	1897–98
38th Coy. S.D., R.A.	–	–	1	1898–99
Argonauts	–	–	1	1902–03
HMS Cressy	–	–	1	1903–04
D.C.L.I.	–	–	1	1912–13
HMS Hampshire	–	–	1	1913–14
The King's Liverpool Regiment	–	–	1	1922–23
Wiltshire Regiment	–	–	1	1936–37
No. 1 Commando	–	–	1	1945–46
Army	–	–	1	1954–55
Fire Services	–	–	1	1969–70
Urban Services	–	–	1	1974–75
Lai Sun	–	–	1	1990–91
Southern	–	–	1	2015–16

== See also ==
- The Football Association of Hong Kong, China
- Hong Kong First Division League
- Hong Kong Premier League
