= 1946–47 Hong Kong Senior Shield =

Tournament details
- Country: Hong Kong

Final positions
- Champions: Sing Tao (1st title)
- Runners-up: South China

1946–47 Hong Kong Senior Shield was the 2nd edition of Hong Kong Challenge Shield after World War II.

== Final ==
1947-04-05

| Sing Tao | 4–1 | South China |

Causeway Bay
