= Centurion-class battleship =

Class of British predreadnought battleships

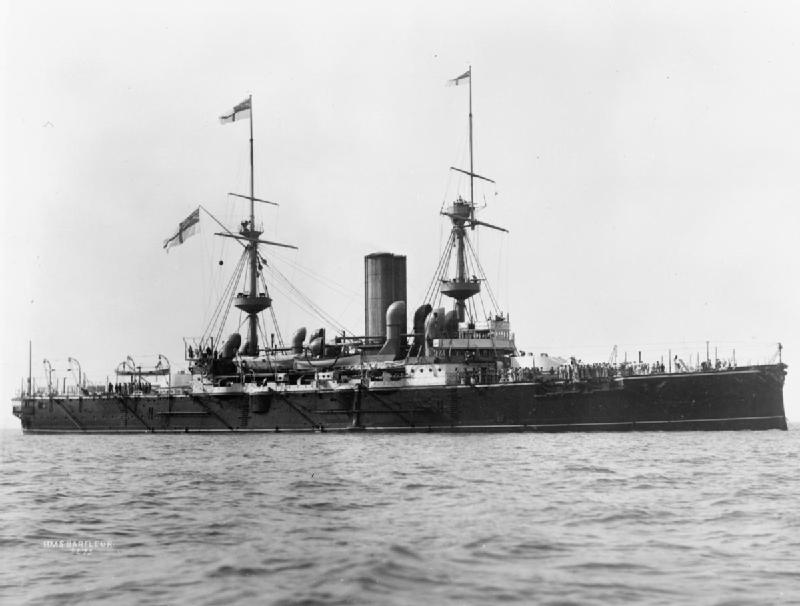
- Barfleur, 1895

Class overview
- Name: Centurion-class battleship
- Operators: Royal Navy
- Preceded by: Royal Sovereign class
- Succeeded by: HMS Renown
- Built: 1890–1894
- In commission: 1894–1909
- Completed: 2
- Scrapped: 2

General characteristics (as built)
- Type: Pre-dreadnought battleship
- Displacement: 10,634 long tons (10,805 t)
- Length: 390 ft 9 in (119.1 m) (o/a)
- Beam: 70 ft (21.3 m)
- Draught: 25 ft 8 in (7.82 m)
- Installed power: 9,000 shp (6,700 kW); 8 Cylindrical boilers
- Propulsion: 2 Shafts; 2 Triple-expansion steam engines
- Speed: 17 knots (31 km/h; 20 mph)
- Range: 5,230 nmi (9,690 km; 6,020 mi) at 10 knots (19 km/h; 12 mph)
- Complement: 606–620
- Armament: 2 × twin 10 in (254 mm) guns; 10 × single 4.7 in (120 mm) guns; 8 × single 6-pdr (2.2 in (57 mm)) guns; 12 × single 3-pdr (1.9 in (47 mm)) guns; 7 × 18 in (450 mm) torpedo tubes
- Armour: Belt: 9–12 in (229–305 mm); Bulkheads: 8 in (203 mm); Decks: 2–2.5 in (51–64 mm); Conning tower: 12 in (305 mm); Barbettes: 5–9 in (127–229 mm); Gunhouses: 6 in (152 mm); Casemates: 2–4 in (51–102 mm)

The Centurion-class battleships were a pair of pre-dreadnought battleships built for the Royal Navy in the 1890s. They were rated as second-class battleships because they were less heavily armed and armoured than the first-class battleships. They were designed for service abroad and were given higher speed and longer range to counter the armoured cruisers then being built as commerce raiders.

Completed in 1894, Centurion and Barfleur spent most of their careers assigned to the China Station or the Mediterranean Fleet, with Centurion usually serving as the flagship of the former. The sister ships participated in the suppression of the Boxer Rebellion in mid-1900. They were rebuilt from 1901 to 1905 and assigned to the Reserve Fleet in 1905 as increasing cruiser speeds made them obsolete. Barfleur served as the flagship of the Portsmouth Division of the Reserve Fleet for several years. They were decommissioned in 1909 and sold for scrap the following year.

== Background and description ==
Authorised by the Naval Defence Act 1889, the Centurion class was designed by William White, Director of Naval Construction, to meet an Admiralty requirement for ships suitable for use as flagships on the China and Pacific Stations, able to defeat the most powerful foreign ships likely to be encountered there. These were most likely to be the Russian 8-inch (203 mm) gunned armoured cruisers then entering service that were intended to attack British merchant shipping in the event of war. The Admiralty required a speed no less than 16.5 knots (30.6 km/h; 19.0 mph), a shallow draught no greater than 26 feet (7.9 m) to pass through the Suez Canal and for navigation on Chinese rivers, a range equal to that of the armoured cruiser Imperieuse, and, most importantly, a cost 30% less than that of the first-class battleship Royal Sovereign. White's design was almost a scaled-down Royal Sovereign with 10-inch (254 mm) and 4.7-inch (120 mm) guns substituted for the 13.5-inch (343 mm) and 6-inch (152 mm) guns of the larger ships.

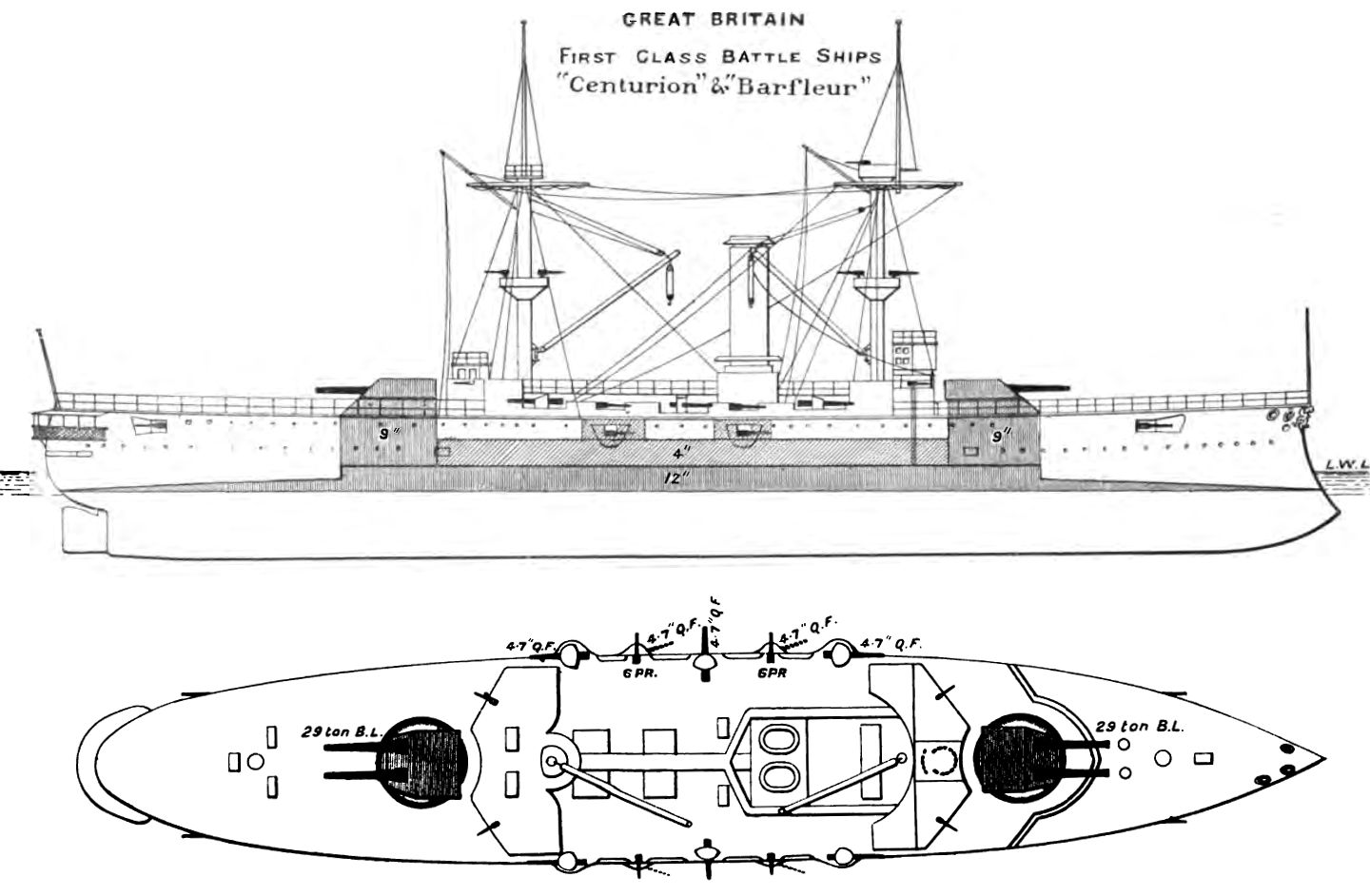
Right elevation and deck plan of the Centurion-class as depicted in Brassey's Naval Annual 1896

The Centurions had an overall length of 390 feet 9 inches (119.1 m) and a length between perpendiculars of 360 ft (109.7 m), and a beam of 70 feet (21.3 m). Their draught at normal load was 25 ft 8 in (7.82 m) and 26 feet 9 inches (8.2 m) at deep load. They displaced 10,634 long tons (10,805 t) at normal load and 11,200 long tons (11,400 t) at deep load. The ships had a metacentric height of 4.1 feet (1.2 m) at deep load. In view of the paucity of docking facilities large enough to handle them in their intended operating areas, their steel hulls were sheathed in wood and copper to reduce biofouling and lengthen the time between bottom cleanings. Their crews numbered 620 officers and ratings in 1895 and 600 after they were rebuilt in the early years of the 20th century. The ships were considered good steamers and good seaboats.

The ships were powered by a pair of three-cylinder vertical triple-expansion steam engines, each driving a single propeller, using steam provided by eight cylindrical boilers at a working pressure of 155 psi (1,069 kPa; 11 kgf/cm^{2}). The engines were designed to produce a total of 9,000 indicated horsepower (6,700 kW) which was intended to allow the ships to make a speed of 17 knots (31 km/h; 20 mph) using natural draught. The engines proved to be slightly more powerful than anticipated and the ships reached 17.1 knots (31.7 km/h; 19.7 mph) from 9,703–9,934 ihp (7,236–7,408 kW) during their sea trials. Using forced draught, they attained 18.5 knots (34.3 km/h; 21.3 mph) from 13,163–13,214 ihp (9,816–9,854 kW) although this often damaged the boilers and was officially discouraged. The Centurions carried a maximum of 1,420–1,440 long tons (1,440–1,460 t) of coal, enough to steam 5,230 nautical miles (9,690 km; 6,020 mi) at 10 knots (19 km/h; 12 mph).

=== Armament ===
The four 32-calibre, breech-loading 10-inch Mk III guns of the main battery were mounted in two twin-gun, circular barbettes, one forward and one aft of the superstructure. These barbettes were the first ones in the Royal Navy to be capable of loading at all angles of traverse and thus were circular rather than pear-shaped like those on the Royal Sovereigns and earlier battleships, which saved a considerable amount of weight. A steam engine was fitted to allow the gun turntable to traverse at one revolution per minute, but it proved too weak in service to completely stop the mounting in one place and tended to creep. The turntable could be rotated manually by a system of gears, but it was completely inadequate to the task. Maximum elevation was +35°, although a small piece of armour had to be removed to prevent the recoiling guns from striking it. The guns were hand-cranked up and down, although Barfleur was equipped with Siemens electric motors as an experiment that could move the guns through their full range of elevation in 14 seconds. The Mk III guns fired shells that weighed 500 pounds (230 kg) with a muzzle velocity of 2,040 ft/s (620 m/s) that had a maximum range of 10,100 yards (9,200 m) when fired at an elevation of +12°05'. When raised to their maximum elevation, the guns could only be fired with a half-load of propellant, which gave them a muzzle velocity of 1,393 ft/s (425 m/s) and a range of 11,522 yards (10,536 m).

Their secondary armament consisted of ten 40-calibre quick-firing (QF) 4.7-inch guns in single mounts. Half a dozen of these guns were mounted on the upper deck, protected by gun shields, and the remaining guns were mounted in casemates in the sides of the hull. They fired a 45-pound (20 kg) shell at a muzzle velocity of 2,125 ft/s (648 m/s). Defence against torpedo boats was provided by eight QF six-pounder, 2.2-inch (57 mm) guns (Note: Available sources do not specify the model of gun installed. Judging by production numbers, it most likely the QF 6-pounder Hotchkiss, not the QF 6-pounder Nordenfelt.) and a dozen QF three-pounder (1.9 in (47 mm)) Hotchkiss guns. These latter guns fired a 3-pound-3-ounce (1.4 kg) shell at a muzzle velocity of 1,867 ft/s (569 m/s). The ships were also armed with seven 18-inch (Note: The actual diameter of these torpedoes was 17.7 inches (450 mm).) torpedo tubes, two on each broadside and one in the stern above water and one on each broadside underwater.

=== Armour ===
The Centurion-class ships were mostly fitted with compound armour although some portions were made from improved Harvey armour. Their waterline main belt ranged in thickness from 9 to 12 inches (229 to 305 mm) although the bottom edge was 8 inches thick. It was 200 feet (61.0 m) long amidships and 7 feet 6 inches (2.3 m) high of which 5 feet (1.5 m) was below the waterline at normal load. Fore and aft oblique bulkheads, 8 inches thick, connected the belt armour to the barbettes to form the armoured citadel. The upper strake of 4-inch (102 mm) Harvey armour was above the waterline belt and 7 feet 6 inches high. It covered the ships' side between the rear of the barbettes up to a height of 10 feet (3.0 m) above the waterline. Oblique bulkheads of Harvey armour 3 inches (76 mm) thick connected the upper armour to the barbettes.

The armoured deck lay across the top of the waterline belt and consisted of 2 inches (51 mm) of mild steel. Below the waterline, the 2.5-inch (64 mm) lower deck extended from the 5-inch (127 mm) bases of the barbettes to the bow and stern. Above the main deck the barbettes were 9 inches thick and 8 inches thick between the main and lower decks. The Centurions were the first British battleships to be fitted with an armoured hood or gunhouse above the barbettes. This was required to protect the large gun crews required to manually work the guns and consisted of 6 inches of nickel steel, although a portion of the rear had to be left open to work the guns. This was the first step in the evolution of the modern gun turret. The casemates for the 4.7-inch guns consisted of 4-inch faces and 2-inch sides of Harvey armour. The sides of the forward conning tower were 12 inches thick while those of the aft conning tower were only 3 inches in thickness.

=== Reconstruction ===
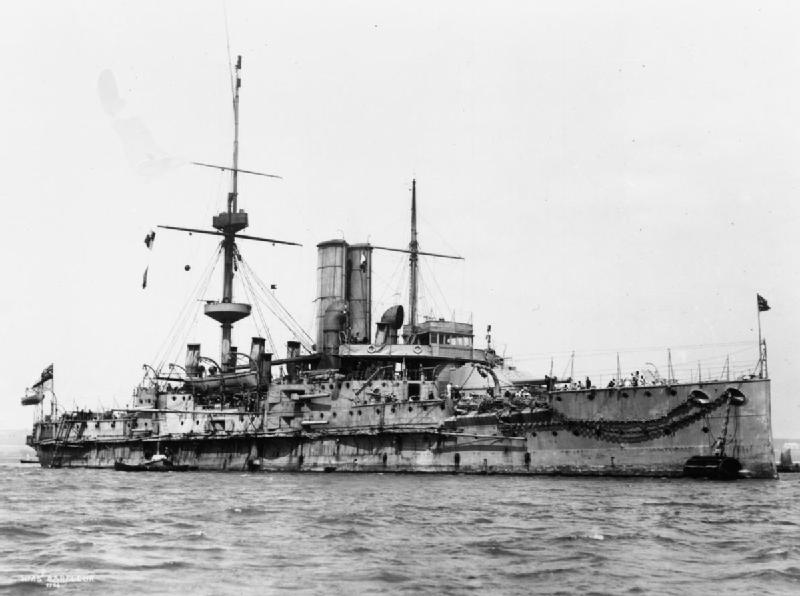
Barfleur at anchor, after 1904

The Centurions had always been criticised for their weak secondary armament and a report by Captain John Jellicoe (captain of Centurion) in June 1901 advocated replacing the 4.7-inch guns with 6-inch guns and the removal of all of their above-water torpedo tubes. The Admiralty agreed with his proposal and plans were quickly drawn up. The BL 6-inch Mk VII gun replaced the smaller guns on a one-for-one basis. They were mounted in four double and two single casemates, six guns on the main deck and four on the upper deck. They were protected by 5-inch casemates of Krupp cemented armour that required the middle section of the superstructure to be rebuilt to accommodate them. To compensate for the additional weight, the aft bridge and the above-water torpedo tubes were removed and the foremast was replaced by a smaller signal mast. In addition a radiotelegraph was fitted. The net increase was only 78 long tons (79 t), although this was enough to slightly reduce their speed to about 16.8 knots (31.1 km/h; 19.3 mph). The reconstruction cost approximately £125,000. (Note: Parkes does not state whether this was for both ships or not.)

== Ships ==
Construction data
Ship	Builder	Price	Laid down	Launched	Commissioned
Centurion	HM Dockyard, Portsmouth	£540,090	30 March 1890	3 August 1892	14 February 1894
Barfleur	HM Dockyard, Chatham	£533,666	12 October 1890	10 August 1892	22 June 1894

=== Service history ===
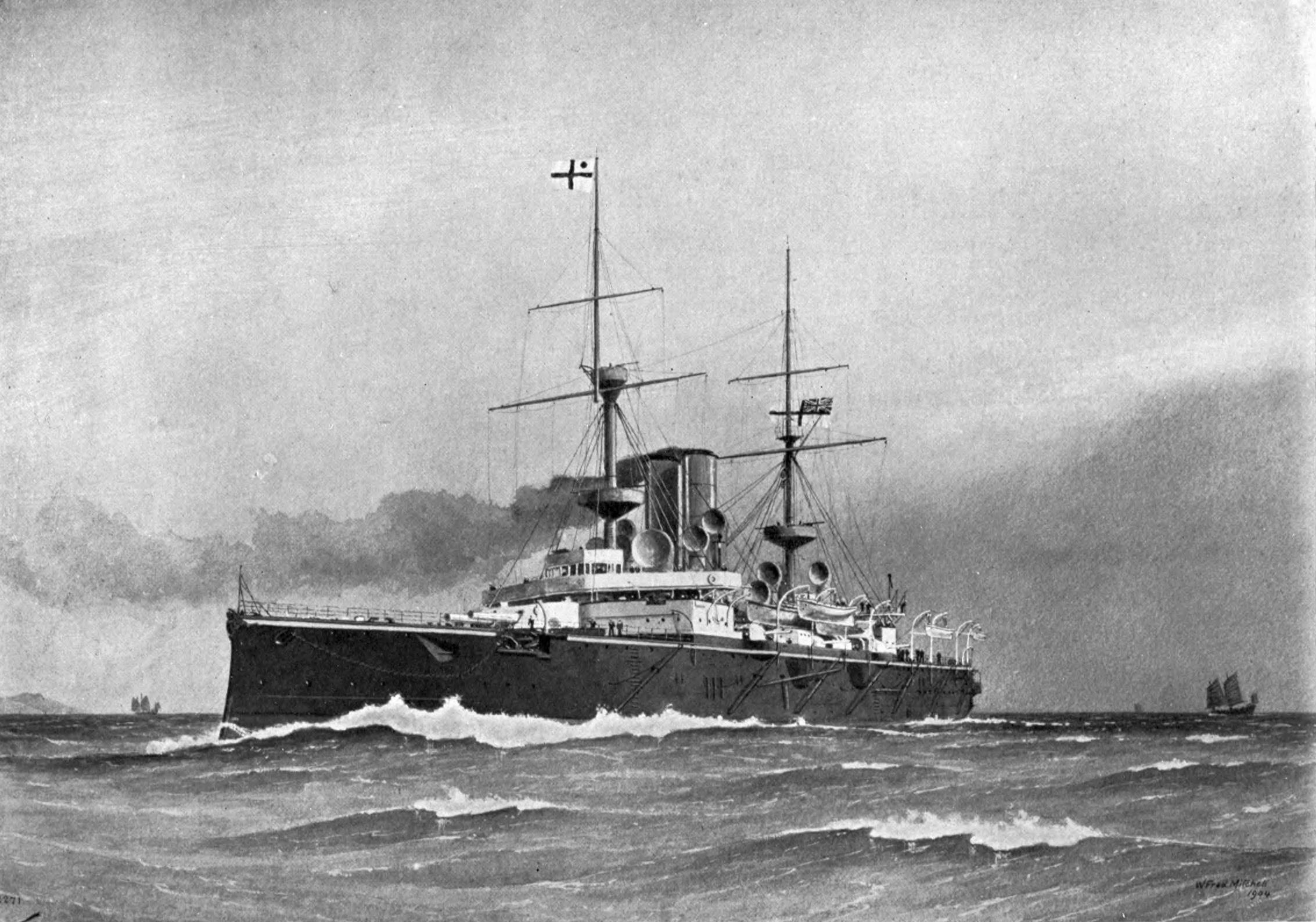
Drawing of Centurion at sea

Centurion was the first of the sisters to be completed and she became flagship of the China Station in 1894. Barfleur was assigned to the Mediterranean Fleet in 1895, and in February 1897 she became part of the International Squadron, a multinational force made up of ships of the Austro-Hungarian Navy, French Navy, Imperial German Navy, Italian Royal Navy (Regia Marina), Imperial Russian Navy, and Royal Navy that intervened in the 1897–1898 Greek Christian uprising against the Ottoman Empire′s rule in Crete. She joined her sister on the China Station in 1898 and became the flagship of the station's second-in-command. During the Boxer Rebellion in 1900, both ships contributed landing parties to participate in the Battles of the Taku Forts and of Tientsin.

The sisters returned home in 1901 and Centurion began her reconstruction that lasted until 1903. Barfleur was briefly placed in reserve in 1902 before she began her reconstruction later that year. Centurion rejoined to the China Station in 1903 and sailed for home in 1905 after the renewal of the Anglo-Japanese Alliance eliminated any need for British battleships in the Far East. Barfleur returned to reserve after her reconstruction was completed in 1904, although she did participate in that year's manoeuvres. The following year, the ship was briefly recommissioned to take a replacement crew to the Far East and then became flagship of the Portsmouth Division of the Reserve Fleet upon her return. She was joined in that unit by Centurion when she arrived in 1905. The sisters remained in reserve until they were listed for sale in 1909 and sold for scrap the following year.
