= 2026–27 Hong Kong Senior Shield =

Tournament details
- Country: Hong Kong
- Dates: 19 September 2026 – 7 February 2027
- Teams: 11

Tournament statistics
- Matches played: 7
- Goals scored: 35 (5 per match)
- Attendance: 2,493 (356 per match)
- Top goal scorer(s): Marcos Gondra; Mikael (3 each)
- All statistics correct as of 25 October 2026.

2026–27 Hong Kong Senior Shield is the 123rd season of the Hong Kong Senior Shield. 11 teams entered this edition, with 3 games being played in the First round before the quarter-finals stage. The competition was only open to teams that played in the 2026–27 Hong Kong Premier League.

The champions received HK$150,000 in prize money while the runners up received HK$50,000. The best player of the final received a HK$10,000 bonus. In addition, the two losing teams in semi-finals received HK$20,000 while the remaining teams received HK$5,000.

Tai Po are the defending champions.

== Calendar ==
Round	Draw Date	Date	Matches	Clubs
First round	29 July 2026	19 – 20 September 2026	3	11 → 8
Quarter-finals	29 July 2026	24 – 25 October 2026	4	8 → 4
Semi-finals	29 July 2026	25 – 26 December 2026	2	4 → 2
Final	29 July 2026	7 February 2027	1	2 → 1

== Bracket ==
First round
20 September 2026
Southern	2
Eastern District	1
19 September 2026
Sha Tin	0
Lee Man	1
20 September 2026
Kowloon City	4
HKFC	1

Quarter-finals
24 October 2026
Tai Po	4
Kitchee	2
24 October 2026
Eastern	5
Southern	3
24 October 2026
Rangers	2
Lee Man	4
25 October 2026
North District	3 (4)
Kowloon City (p)	3 (5)

Semi-finals
25 December 2026
Tai Po
Eastern
26 December 2026
Lee Man
Kowloon City

Final
7 February 2027

== Fixtures and results ==
=== First round ===
19 September 2026	Sha Tin	0–1	Lee Man	Aberdeen Sports Ground
16:00		Report	Yung Hui To 66'	Attendance: 432; Referee: Yu Kin Fung

19 September 2026	Kowloon City	4–1	HKFC	Siu Sai Wan Sports Ground
16:00	Mikael 20', 82'; Riquelme 36', 59'	Report	Bleda 55'	Attendance: 152; Referee: Liu Kwok Man

20 September 2026	Southern	2–1	Eastern District	Tai Po Sports Ground
16:00	Golubović 75'; Pereira 88'	Report	Léo 68'	Attendance: 395; Referee: Luk Kin Sun

=== Quarter-finals ===
24 October 2026	Eastern	5–3	Southern	Tai Po Sports Ground
16:00	Gondra 12', 20', 87'; Cova 27'; Sá 60'	Report	Wong Ho Chun 45+1'; Pereira 57' (pen.); Landa 80'	Attendance: 370; Referee: Cheung Wai Lung

24 October 2026	Tai Po	4–2	Kitchee	Tsing Yi Sports Ground
19:00	Wallisson 46'; Fernando 48', 76'; Chang Hei Yin 52'	Report	Juninho 34'; Everton 56'	Attendance: 612; Referee: Lau Fong Hei

25 October 2026	Rangers	2–4	Lee Man	North District Sports Ground
16:00	Ibrahim 16'; Paulinho 74'	Report	Willian 32'; Udebuluzor 51'; Martínez 76'; Kraev 90+1'	Attendance: 324; Referee: Yu Kin Fung

25 October 2026	North District	3–3 (4–5 p)	Kowloon City	Siu Sai Wan Sports Ground
19:00	Páez 19'; Granada 53'; Vinicius 93'	Report	Mikael 15'; Muens 23'; Chen Ngo Hin 99'	Attendance: 208; Referee: Woo Chun Sing
	Penalties
	Granada (penalty scored); Páez (penalty scored); Vinicius (penalty scored); Kayke David (penalty missed); Gudula (penalty scored); Law Hiu Chung (penalty missed)		Mikael (penalty scored); Kang Jun-hyeon (penalty missed); Diego (penalty scored); Chen Ngo Hin (penalty scored); Popović (penalty scored); Lucena (penalty scored)

=== Semi-finals ===
25 December 2026	Tai Po	v	Eastern	Mong Kok Stadium
15:00		Report

26 December 2026	Lee Man	v	Kowloon City	Mong Kok Stadium
15:00		Report

=== Final ===
7 February 2027	v	Mong Kok Stadium
15:00	Report

== Top scorers ==
Rank	Player	Club	Goals
1	(Spain) Marcos Gondra	Eastern	3
1	(Brazil) Mikael	Kowloon City	3
3	(Hong Kong) Fernando	Tai Po	2
3	(Brazil) Riquelme	Kowloon City	2
3	(Hong Kong) Stefan Pereira	Southern	2
6	23 players		1
