= HMS Centurion (1892) =

British lead ship of Centurion-class

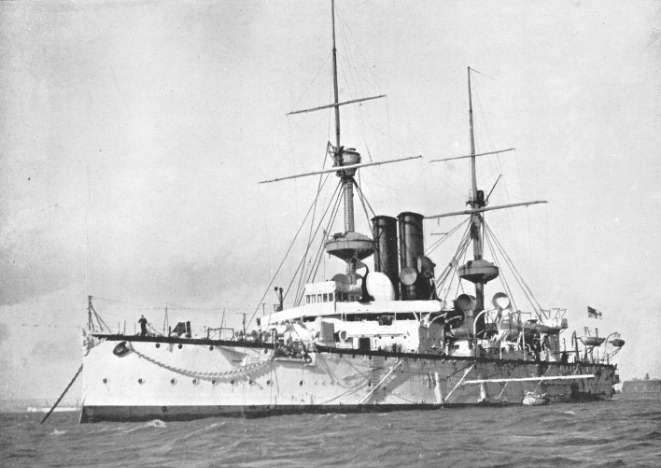
- Centurion at anchor

History

United Kingdom
- Name: Centurion
- Namesake: Centurion
- Builder: HM Dockyard, Portsmouth
- Cost: £540,090
- Laid down: 30 March 1890
- Launched: 3 August 1892
- Commissioned: 14 February 1894
- Decommissioned: 1 April 1909
- Refit: 19 September 1901 – 3 November 1903
- Fate: Sold for scrap, 12 July 1910

General characteristics (as built)
- Class & type: Centurion-class pre-dreadnought battleship
- Displacement: 10,634 long tons (10,805 t)
- Length: 390 ft 9 in (119.1 m) (o/a)
- Beam: 70 ft (21.3 m)
- Draught: 25 ft 8 in (7.82 m)
- Installed power: 9,000 ihp (6,700 kW); 8 Cylindrical boilers
- Propulsion: 2 Shafts; 2 Triple-expansion steam engines
- Speed: 17 knots (31 km/h; 20 mph)
- Range: 5,230 nmi (9,690 km; 6,020 mi) at 10 knots (19 km/h; 12 mph)
- Complement: 606–620
- Armament: 2 × twin 10 in (254 mm) guns; 10 × single 4.7 in (120 mm) guns; 8 × single 6-pdr (2.2 in (57 mm)) guns; 12 × single 3-pdr (1.9 in (47 mm)) guns; 7 × 18 in (450 mm) torpedo tubes
- Armour: Belt: 9–12 in (229–305 mm); Decks: 2–2.5 in (51–64 mm); Barbettes: 5–9 in (127–229 mm); Gunhouses: 6 in (152 mm)

HMS Centurion was the lead ship of her class of two pre-dreadnought battleships built for the Royal Navy in the 1890s. Intended for service abroad, they exchanged heavy armour and a powerful armament for high speed and long range to counter the foreign armoured cruisers then being built as commerce raiders and were rated as second-class battleships.

Completed in 1894, Centurion was assigned to the China Station as its flagship. Together with her sister ship, Barfleur, she supported Allied operations during the Boxer Rebellion of 1899–1901 and contributed landing parties to participate in the Battles of the Taku Forts and of Tientsin. The ship returned home in 1901 to be rebuilt with a more powerful secondary armament. Centurion rejoined the China Station two years later and remained there until 1905 when she returned to Britain. Already made obsolete by the increasing speeds of the cruisers the ship was designed to defend against, she was placed in reserve until 1909. Centurion was decommissioned that year and sold for scrap in 1910.

== Design and description ==
The Centurion class was designed to meet an Admiralty requirement for ships suitable for use as flagships on the China and Pacific Stations, able to defeat the most powerful foreign ships likely to be encountered there. They had an overall length of 390 feet 9 inches (119.1 m) and a length between perpendiculars of 360 ft (109.7 m), and a beam of 70 feet (21.3 m). Their draught at normal load was 25 ft 8 in (7.82 m) and 26 feet 9 inches (8.2 m) at deep load. The Centurion-class ships displaced 10,634 long tons (10,805 t) at normal load and 11,200 long tons (11,400 t) at deep load. Their steel hulls were sheathed in wood and copper to reduce biofouling. Their crews numbered 620 officers and ratings in 1895 and 600 after they were rebuilt in the early years of the 20th century.

The Centurions were powered by a pair of three-cylinder vertical triple-expansion steam engines, each driving a single propeller, using steam provided by eight coal-fired cylindrical boilers. The engines were designed to produce a total of 9,000 indicated horsepower (6,700 kW) which was intended to allow the ships to make a speed of 17 knots (31 km/h; 20 mph) using natural draught. The engines proved to be slightly more powerful than anticipated and Centurion reached 17.05 knots (31.6 km/h; 19.6 mph) from 9,703 ihp (7,236 kW) during her sea trials. Using forced draught, she attained 18.51 knots (34.3 km/h; 21.3 mph) from 13,214 ihp (9,854 kW) although this often damaged the boilers and was officially discouraged. The Centurion-class ships had a range of 5,230 nautical miles (9,690 km; 6,020 mi) at 10 knots (19 km/h; 12 mph).

=== Armament and armour ===
The four 32-calibre, breech-loading 10-inch Mk III guns of the main battery were mounted in two twin-gun, circular barbettes, one forward and one aft of the superstructure. Their secondary armament consisted of ten 40-calibre quick-firing (QF) 4.7-inch guns in single mounts. Half a dozen of these guns were mounted on the upper deck, protected by gun shields, and the remaining guns were mounted in casemates in the sides of the hull. Defence against torpedo boats was provided by eight QF six-pounder (2.2-inch (57 mm)) guns (Note: Available sources do not specify the model of gun installed. Judging by production numbers, it most likely the QF 6-pounder Hotchkiss, not the QF 6-pounder Nordenfelt.) and a dozen QF three-pounder (1.9 in (47 mm)) Hotchkiss guns. The ships were also armed with seven 18-inch (Note: The actual diameter of these torpedoes was 17.7 inches (450 mm).) torpedo tubes, two on each broadside and one in the stern above water and one on each broadside underwater.

The Centurion-class ships were mostly fitted with compound armour although some portions were made from improved Harvey armour. Their waterline main belt ranged in thickness from 9 to 12 inches (229 to 305 mm). The armoured deck lay across the top of the waterline belt and consisted of 2 inches (51 mm) of mild steel. Below the waterline, the 2.5-inch (64 mm) lower deck extended from the 5-inch (127 mm) bases of the barbettes to the bow and stern. The barbettes were 8 or 9 inches (203 or 229 mm) thick and the gun crews were protected by an armoured hood or gunhouse that consisted of 6 inches of nickel steel.

== Modifications ==
Bilge keels were added to Centurion in 1896–1897 and gun shields were removed from those guns mounted in the fighting tops between 1897 and 1899. Some three-pounders were removed from Centurion's fighting tops about two years later. In September 1901, the ship began a reconstruction that exchanged her 4.7-inch guns with 6-inch guns and upgraded their protection. To help compensate for the additional weight, all of her above-water torpedo tubes were removed as was the aft bridge. The remaining three-pounders in the fighting tops were repositioned to the superstructure and the barbette hoods and the foremast was replaced by a signal mast. Despite these measures there was a slight increase in weight that reduced the ship's speed by about 0.25 knots (0.5 km/h; 0.3 mph). In 1906 all of her remaining three-pounders were removed and the mainmast fighting top was modified as a fire-control position.

== Construction and career ==
Centurion was named after the Roman Army rank and was the sixth ship of her name to serve in the Royal Navy. The ship was laid down at HM Dockyard, Portsmouth on 30 March 1890 and launched on 3 August 1892. She was completed in February 1894 at a cost of £540,090. Centurion was commissioned on 14 February for service on the China Station under the command of Captain Edmund Poë. She sailed for the Far East on 2 March and, upon her arrival at Singapore on 11 April, became the flagship of the China Station when Vice-Admiral The Honourable Sir Edmund Fremantle, Commander-in-Chief of the China Station, hoisted his flag aboard her. Captain John McQuhae relieved Poë three days later. In his turn, McQuhae was relieved by Captain Spencer Login on 21 March 1895. Vice-Admiral Sir Alexander Buller relieved Fremantle on 28 May.

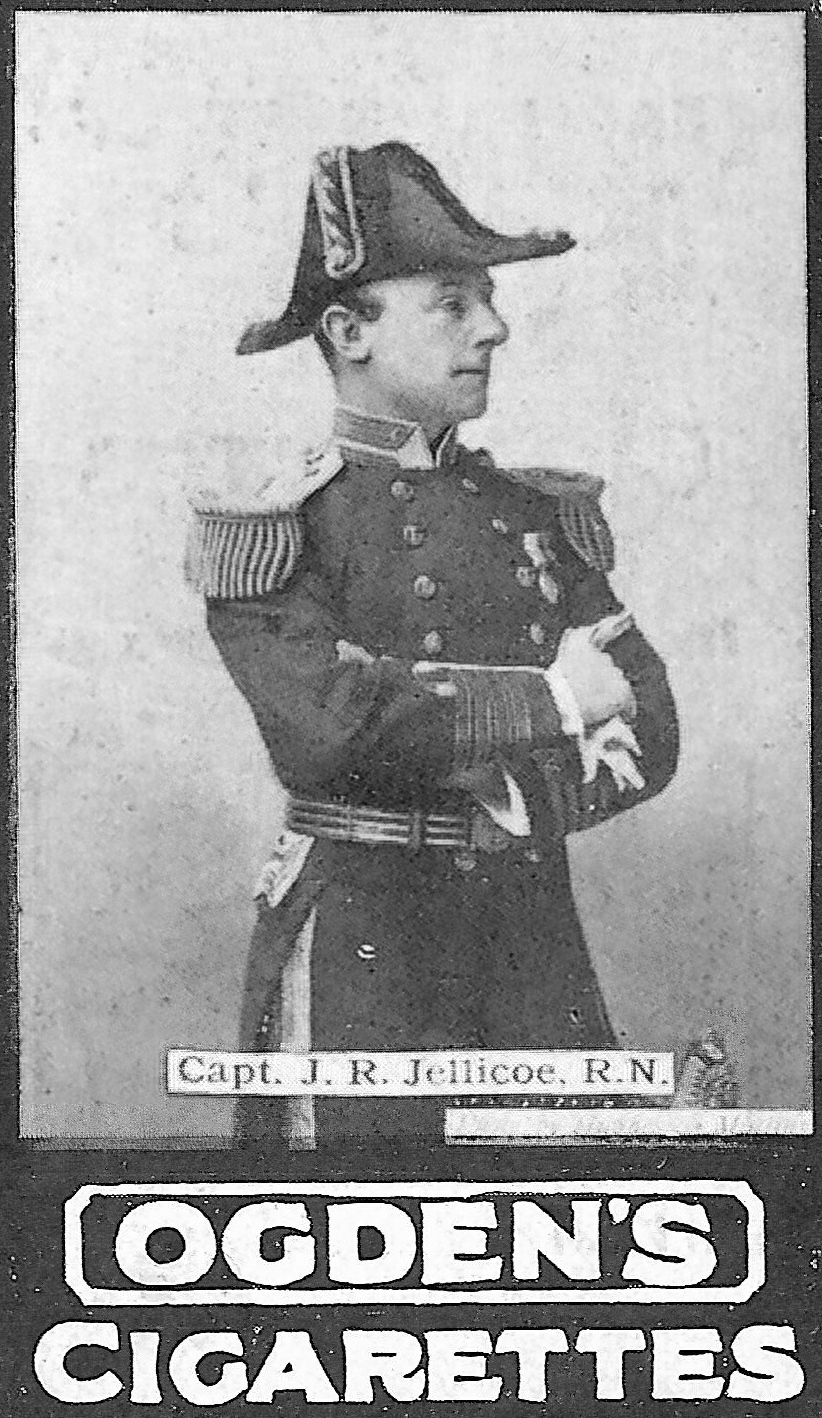
Jellicoe depicted on a contemporary cigarette card

Centurion ran aground on a sandbank at Shimonoseki, Japan in June 1896, but was not damaged. Captain John Jellicoe (the future First Sea Lord) assumed command of the ship on 12 February 1898. A week later, Vice-Admiral Sir Edward Seymour hoisted his flag aboard her. During the Boxer Rebellion, she contributed men to Seymour's expedition that attempted and failed to relieve the besieged International Legations in Peking, capital of China, between 10 and 28 June 1900. Jellicoe served as Seymour's flag-captain during the expedition and was badly wounded on the 21st. In addition, the ship put landing parties ashore which joined other forces in storming the Taku forts on 16–17 June and in relieving the foreign legations at Tientsin on 13–14 July.

While anchored at Wusong, China, near Shanghai, she parted her mooring cables during a storm on 17 April 1901 and drifted across the bows of the battleship HMS Glory. Glory's bow punched a hole in Centurion's hull below the waterline, but the damage was not serious and was repaired at Hong Kong. Glory relieved Centurion as flagship on 10 June and Vice-Admiral Sir Cyprian Bridge relieved Seymour on the 26th. Centurion, with Seymour aboard, arrived at Portsmouth on 19 August, where she was welcomed by the local Commander-in-Chief and thousands of people lining the beach and pier. Admiral Seymour struck his flag on 21 August, and, after a month, Centurion paid off into reserve there on 19 September.

The ship began a reconstruction at Portsmouth that month, including a partial rearmament, that lasted until on 3 November 1903 when she recommissioned for another period of service on the China Station. Centurion departed Portsmouth on 10 November and arrived at Hong Kong on 31 December 1903. In 1905, the United Kingdom and Japan renewed the Anglo-Japanese Alliance which reduced the need for a large Royal Navy presence on the China Station and all its battleships were withdrawn. Accordingly, on 7 June, Centurion, together with the battleship HMS Ocean, departed Hong Kong. At Singapore, they rendezvoused with the battleships HMS Albion and HMS Vengeance. The four battleships departed Singapore on 20 June and steamed in company to Plymouth, where they arrived on 2 August.

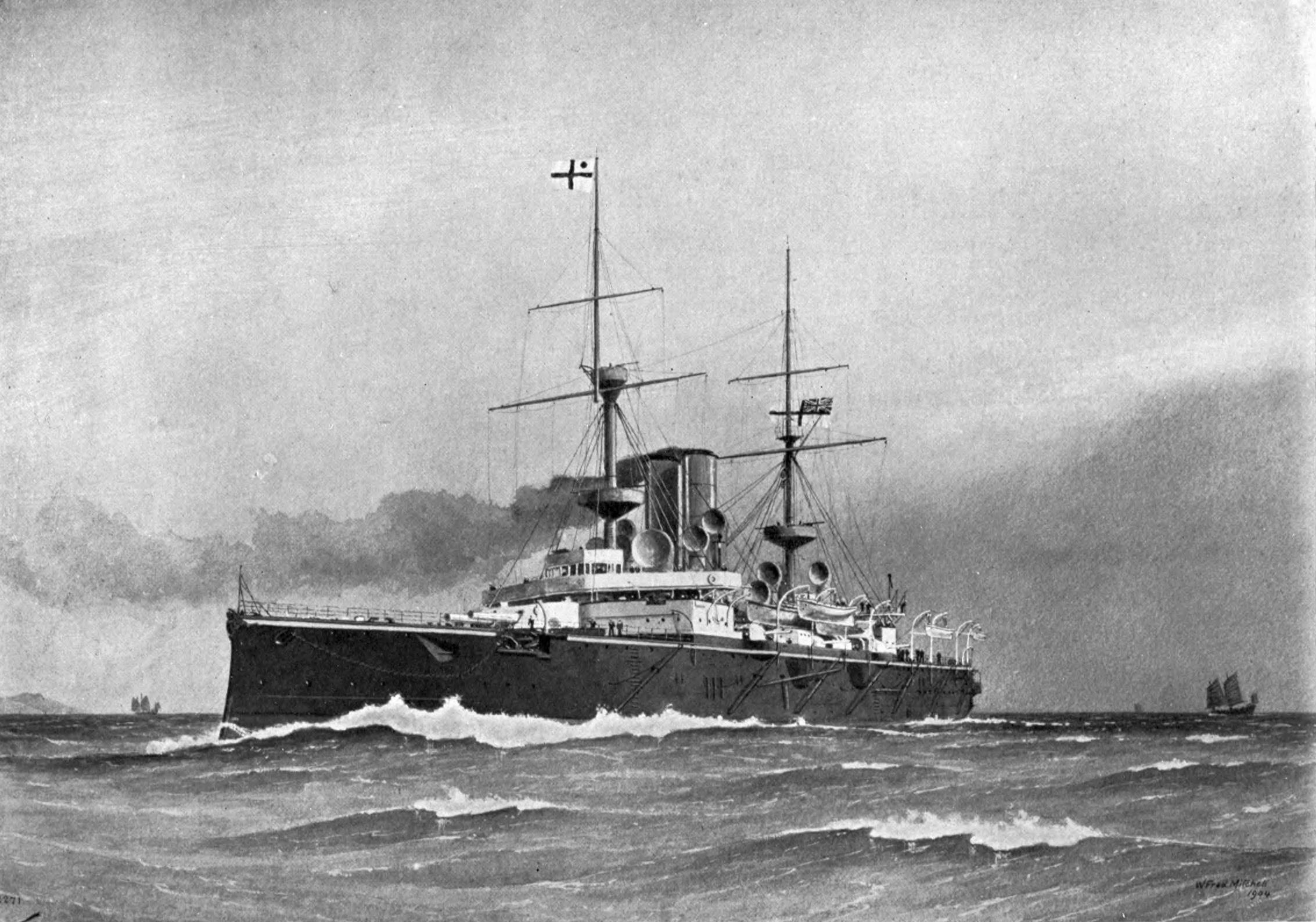
HMS Centurion by W. Fred Mitchell, 1904

Centurion paid off at Portsmouth on 25 August. She recommissioned the following day with a nucleus crew as part of the Portsmouth Division of the Reserve Fleet because she was already obsolete. The ship participated in combined exercises of the Reserve Fleet, Atlantic Fleet, and Channel Fleet in June 1906. On 24 May 1907, Centurion transferred her crew to the battleship HMS Exmouth and recommissioned the next day with a new nucleus crew to serve as a special service vessel with the Portsmouth Division of the Home Fleet, the Reserve Fleet having been absorbed by the Home Fleet in the meantime. In March 1909, the special service vessels were reassigned to the 4th Division, Home Fleet.

This did not last long as Centurion paid off for the last time on 1 April and was listed for sale. By the end of June, she was anchored at the Motherbank, awaiting disposal. The ship was sold for scrap on 12 July 1910 for a price of £26,300, and arrived at Thos. W. Ward, Morecambe to begin demolition on 4 September.

== Legacy ==
In August 1902 an obelisk was erected in Victoria Park, Portsmouth, in memory of the officers and men of the Centurion who had died in China.

The Figurehead of Centurion was removed from the ship in 1901 and is now in he collection of the National Museum of the Royal Navy.
