= HMS Albion (1898) =

Pre-dreadnought battleship of the British Royal Navy

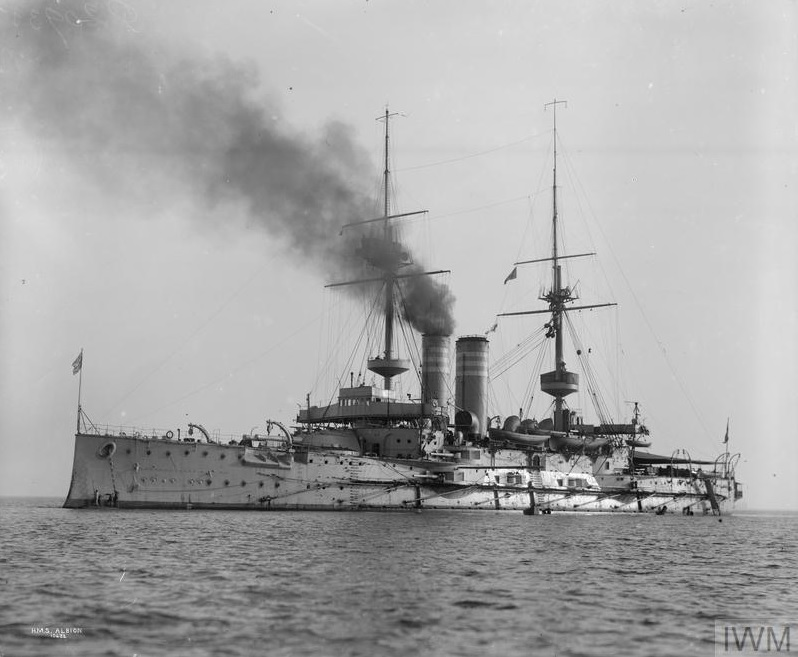

History

United Kingdom
- Name: HMS Albion
- Namesake: Albion
- Ordered: 1896 Programme
- Builder: Thames Ironworks and Shipbuilding Co. Ltd, Leamouth, London
- Laid down: 3 December 1896
- Launched: 21 June 1898
- Completed: June 1901
- Commissioned: 25 June 1901
- Decommissioned: August 1919
- Fate: Sold for scrapping 11 December 1919

General characteristics
- Class & type: Canopus-class pre-dreadnought battleship
- Displacement: Full load: 14,300 long tons (14,500 t)
- Length: 421 ft 6 in (128.5 m) (loa)
- Beam: 74 ft (22.6 m)
- Draught: 26 ft (7.9 m)
- Installed power: 20 × water tube boilers; 13,500 ihp (10,100 kW)
- Propulsion: 2 × screw propellers; 2 × triple-expansion steam engines
- Speed: 18 knots (33 km/h)
- Complement: 750
- Armament: 4 × BL 12 in (305 mm) 35-caliber Mk VIII guns; 12 × QF 6 in (152 mm) 40-caliber guns; 10 × 12-pounder 76 mm (3 in) quick-firing guns; 6 × 3-pounder guns; 4 × 18 in (457 mm) torpedo tubes
- Armour: Belt: 6 in; Bulkheads: 6–10 in (152–254 mm); Barbettes: 12 in; Gun turrets: 8 in (203 mm); Casemates: 5 in (127 mm); Conning tower: 12 in; Deck: 1–2 in (25–51 mm)

HMS Albion was a pre-dreadnought battleship of the British Royal Navy and a member of the Canopus class. Intended for service in Asia, Albion and her sister ships were smaller and faster than the preceding Majestic-class battleships, but retained the same battery of four 12-inch (305 mm) guns. She also carried thinner armour, but incorporated new Krupp steel, which was more effective than the Harvey armour used in the Majestics. Albion was laid down in December 1896 and launched in June 1898. At the launch a temporary viewing platform was struck by the waves, causing the death of at least 34 people. The ship was commissioned into the fleet in June 1901.

Albion spent the first few years of her career abroad on the China Station from 1901 to 1905, before returning to British waters to serve with the Channel Fleet and later the Atlantic Fleet. After the outbreak of the First World War in August 1914, she was mobilised and returned to the Channel Fleet, but was quickly sent to the Atlantic to help defend against the possibility of German warships breaking out of the North Sea. In December and January 1915, she supported operations against German Southwest Africa.

The ship was transferred to the Mediterranean Sea in January 1915 to participate in the Dardanelles Campaign. She participated in major attacks on the Ottoman coastal fortifications defending the Dardanelles in March 1915, but the British and French fleets proved incapable of forcing the straits. During these operations, Albion was damaged by Ottoman artillery twice. In October 1915, she was transferred to Salonika to support the Allied operations against Bulgaria through then-neutral Greece, but she saw no further action. She was transferred back to Ireland in April 1916 for service as a guard ship, a role she filled until October 1918, when she was reduced to a barracks ship. Albion was sold for scrap in December 1919 and broken up the following year.

== Design ==
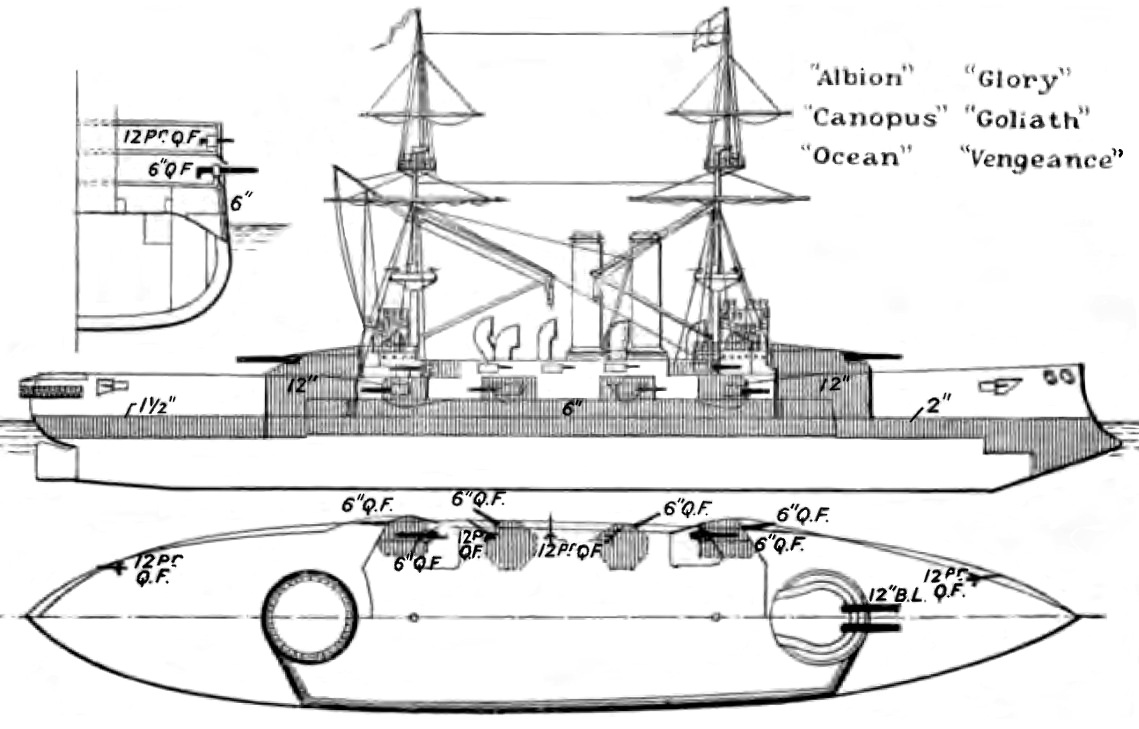
Right elevation, deck plan and hull section as depicted in Brassey's Naval Annual 1906

Albion and her five sister ships were designed for service in East Asia, where the new rising power Japan was beginning to build a powerful navy, though this role was quickly made redundant by the Anglo-Japanese Alliance of 1902. The ships were designed to be smaller, lighter and faster than their predecessors, the Majestic-class battleships. Albion was 421 feet 6 inches (128.47 m) long overall, with a beam of 74 ft (23 m) and a draft of 26 ft 2 in (7.98 m). She displaced 13,150 long tons (13,360 t) normally and up to 14,300 long tons (14,500 t) fully loaded. Her crew numbered 682 officers and ratings.

The Canopus-class ships were powered by a pair of 3-cylinder triple-expansion engines, with steam provided by twenty Belleville boilers. They were the first British battleships with water-tube boilers, which generated more power at less expense in weight compared with the fire-tube boilers used in previous ships. The new boilers led to the adoption of fore-and-aft funnels, rather than the side-by-side funnel arrangement used in many previous British battleships. The Canopus-class ships proved to be good steamers, with a high speed for battleships of their time—18 knots (33 km/h; 21 mph) from 13,500 indicated horsepower (10,100 kW)—a full two knots faster than the Majestics.

Albion had a main battery of four 12-inch (305 mm) 35-calibre guns mounted in twin-gun turrets fore and aft; these guns were mounted in circular barbettes that allowed all-around loading, although at a fixed elevation. The ships also mounted a secondary battery of twelve 6-inch (152 mm) 40-calibre guns mounted in casemates, in addition to ten 12-pounder guns and six 3-pounder guns for defence against torpedo boats. As was customary for battleships of the period, she was also equipped with four 18-inch (457 mm) torpedo tubes submerged in the hull, two on each broadside near the forward and aft barbette.

To save weight, Albion carried less armour than the Majestics—6 inches (152 mm) in the belt compared to 9 in (229 mm)—although the change from Harvey armour in the Majestics to Krupp armour in Albion meant that the loss in protection was not as great as it might have been, Krupp armour having greater protective value at a given weight than its Harvey equivalent. Similarly, the other armour used to protect the ship could also be thinner; the bulkheads on either end of the belt were 6 to 10 in (152 to 254 mm) thick. The main battery turrets were 10 in thick, atop 12 in (305 mm) barbettes, and the casemate battery was protected with 5 in (127 mm) of Krupp steel. Her conning tower had 12 in thick sides as well. She was fitted with two armoured decks, 1 and 2 in (25 and 51 mm) thick, respectively.

== Service history ==
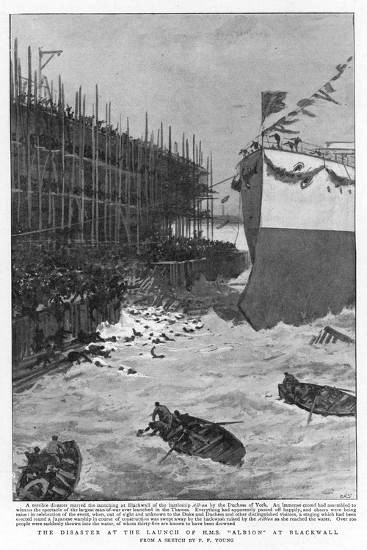
The disaster at the launch of HMS Albion at Blackwall. The Graphic 1898

HMS Albion was laid down by Thames Iron Works at Leamouth, London on 3 December 1896. She was launched on 21 June 1898, after being christened by Mary of Teck, then Duchess of York. The wave created by Albion's entry into the water caused a stage from which 200 people were watching to collapse into a side creek, and 34 people, mostly women and children, drowned in one of the worst peacetime disasters in Thames history. Both the launch and the stage collapse were captured on film by E. P. Prestwich and Robert W. Paul. The decision to distribute these films was controversial in its day, sparking one of the earliest debates surrounding videojournalism.

Albion's completion then was delayed by late delivery of her machinery. She finally began trials late in 1900, during which she was further delayed by machinery and gun defects, and she was not finally completed until June 1901. HMS Albion was commissioned on 25 June 1901 at Chatham Dockyard, by Captain W. W. Hewett and a complement of 779 officers and men, to relieve battleship Barfleur on the China Station.

She arrived at Hong Kong on 11 September 1901, and relieved Barfleur as second flagship of the China Station, based in that city. Captain Martyn Jerram was appointed flag captain in March 1902. During her time on the station, she underwent refits at Hong Kong in 1902 and 1905. In 1905, the United Kingdom and Japan ratified a treaty of alliance, reducing the requirement for a large British presence on the China Station, and the Royal Navy recalled all its battleships from the station. At Singapore, Albion rendezvoused with her sister ships Ocean and Vengeance and battleship Centurion, and on 20 June 1905 the four battleships departed to steam in company to Plymouth, where they arrived on 2 August 1905. Albion then became part of the Channel Fleet. She soon suffered a mishap, colliding with battleship Duncan at Lerwick on 26 September 1905, but suffered no damage. Albion transferred to the commissioned Reserve on 3 April 1906, and underwent an engine and boiler refit at Chatham. On 25 February 1907, Albion paid off at Portsmouth.

On 26 February 1907, Albion recommissioned at Portsmouth for temporary service with the Portsmouth Division of the Home Fleet. She returned to full commission on 26 March 1907 to begin service in the Atlantic Fleet. During this service, she underwent a refit at Gibraltar in 1908 and at Malta in 1909. She was with the fleet that visited London from 17 July to 24 July 1909 to be entertained by the citizens of the city, and on 31 July 1909 was present at the fleet review of the Home and Atlantic Fleets at Cowes by King Edward VII and Queen Alexandra. Albion ended her Atlantic Fleet service by paying off on 25 August 1909. She then began service at the Nore as parent ship of the 4th Division, Home Fleet. She became a unit of the 3rd Fleet at the Nore in May 1912, and underwent a refit at Chatham that year. She was stationed at Pembroke Dock in 1913.

=== First World War ===
When the First World War broke out in August 1914, Albion was assigned to the 8th Battle Squadron, Channel Fleet. On 15 August 1914, she became second flagship of the new 7th Battle Squadron. On 21 August 1914, she was sent to the Saint Vincent-Finisterre Station to provide battleship support to cruiser squadrons operating in the Atlantic in case Imperial German Navy heavy ships broke out into the open Atlantic. Here, she served as the flagship of Rear Admiral H. L. Tottenham. On 3 September 1914, she transferred her flag, becoming a private ship, and moved to the Cape Verde-Canary Islands station to relieve her sister ship Canopus there. Albion was transferred to the Cape of Good Hope Station in South Africa in October 1914, where she took up duty as a guard ship at Walvis Bay through November 1914. Following the Battle of Coronel on 1 November, where a British cruiser squadron was defeated by the German East Asia Squadron, the Admiralty ordered Rear Admiral Herbert King-Hall, the commander of the Cape of Good Hope Station, to concentrate his squadron to prevent Spee from defeating him in detail. Albion was accordingly recalled from Walvis Bay to Table Bay. In December 1914 and January 1915, she participated in Allied operations against German Southwest Africa. Later in January, Albion returned to port in Simon's Town, South Africa, before proceeding to the Mediterranean Sea.

==== Dardanelles campaign ====
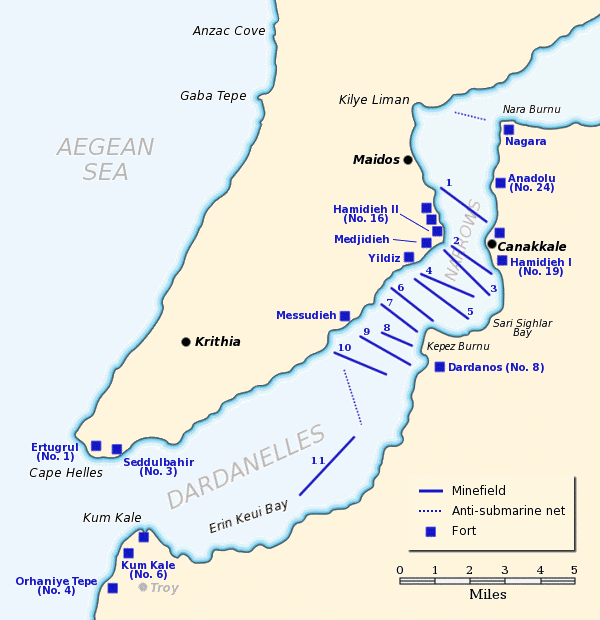
Map showing the Ottoman defences at the Dardanelles in 1915

Albion transferred to the Mediterranean in January 1915 to participate in the Dardanelles campaign. She took part in the bombardment of the Ottoman Turkish forts guarding the outer entrance to the Dardanelles on 19 February 1915. This was the first stage in a plan to force the Dardanelles and enter the Sea of Marmara. Albion was joined by three other British battlecruisers and battleships—Inflexible, Triumph, and Cornwallis—and two French battleships—Bouvet and Suffren. Once these ships had cleared the initial defences, additional ships would join the attack; heavy Ottoman resistance instead stalled the initial attack before Albion could begin her part of the operation, and she did not see action that day. Nevertheless, she did sweep an area for naval mines along with the protected cruiser Amethyst; while on the operation, Albion fired eight 6-inch shells in an unsuccessful attempt to draw Ottoman attention so their guns could be destroyed by counter-battery fire.

Albion participated in another attack on the forts on 25 February; she was tasked with covering a group of minesweepers, along with Triumph and several destroyers after the main bombardment force suppressed the Ottoman batteries. During their operation, Albion came under fire from a 9.4-inch (240 mm) gun from Battery "Orkaniye"; counter fire from Albion, Agamemnon and Irresistible forced the Ottomans to check their fire. By the afternoon, most of the Ottoman artillery had ceased firing, apart from some field guns that could not be observed, and so the minesweepers were ordered to begin clearing the mines, covered by Albion, Triumph, and Vengeance. The following day, Albion, Triumph, and Majestic were assigned to the force that was to break into the Dardanelles and destroy the fortresses at close range. Albion was assigned to the fort at Dardanus, and she opened fire with her main battery at a range of 12,000 yards (11,000 m), though the Ottoman response was light. After the guns fell silent, Albion and Majestic moved on but quickly came under fire from dispersed, mobile field guns, and both vessels were forced to take evasive maneuvers to avoid serious damage. After Majestic was holed below the waterline, Admiral John de Robeck ordered them to break off the attack.

On 28 February, Albion took part in another attempt to suppress the Ottoman defences in the Dardanelles; she and Triumph led the operation, and were tasked with neutralizing the repaired fortress at Dardanus, while Majestic and Ocean supported them by engaging the mobile field guns. As Albion and Triumph approached Dardanus, they came under heavy fire from Ottoman guns on the European side of the straits, including the fortress at Erenköy, and were forced to circle to avoid taking hits. Unable to engage Dardanus under these conditions, the ships instead opened fire on the guns at Erenköy, which initially seemed to be effective, as the Ottoman fire slackened. Ocean and Majestic approached in an attempt to attack Dardanus, but they too came under renewed, furious fire from Erenköy, and de Robeck again ordered a withdrawal. The only success came after the four battleships withdrew from the straits and a landing party from Triumph went ashore and disabled a number of light guns. The inability of the British and French fleets to neutralize the mobile field guns convinced the Allied command that the only way forward would be to make a major amphibious assault to clear the guns by land.

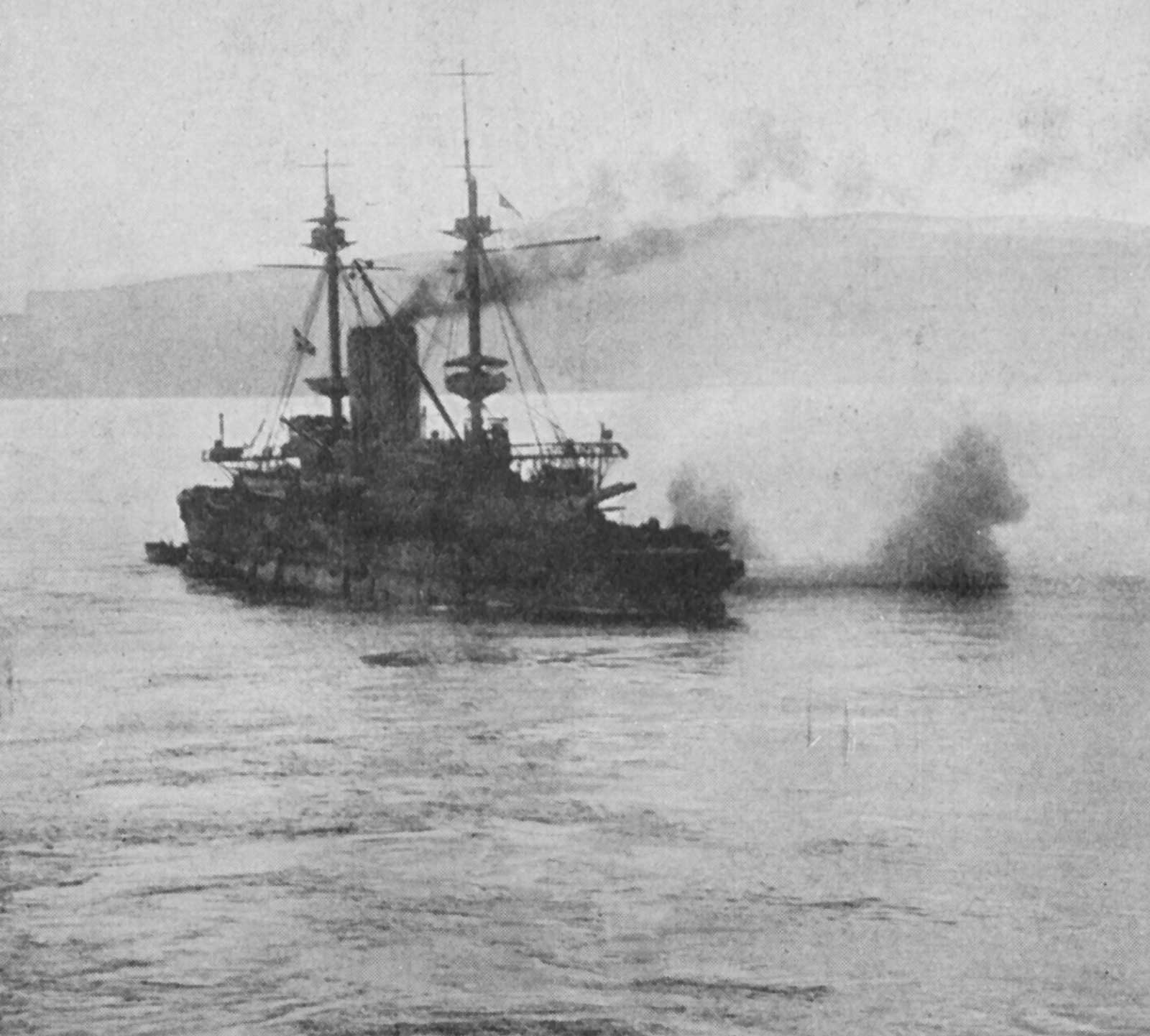
Albion during operations off the Dardanelles; a pair of Ottoman shells splash near the ship

Albion supported another operation in the Dardanelles on 3 March; she, Triumph and Prince George covered a landing force that was to raid Sedd el Bahr. Heavy weather delayed the start of the attack, but the landing took place without incident. Albion shelled Erenköy, which did not return fire, and the landing party discovered a battery of six 15-pounder field guns that they destroyed. Two days later, Albion conducted an indirect fire test to determine the efficacy of attempting to neutralize the fortresses at ranges where the Ottomans would be unable to reply; this was planned to demonstrate the feasibility of using the powerful dreadnought Queen Elizabeth, armed with 15-inch (380 mm) guns, in that role. Albion was tasked with shelling one of the fortresses protecting Çanakkale, and she was covered by several British and French battleships. On entering the straits, Albion came under heavy fire, particularly from Dardanus; three of the covering battleships joined her to suppress those guns, briefly allowing Albion to anchor and begin the planned bombardment. Queen Elizabeth joined the bombardment, but mobile howitzers quickly found both vessels and forced de Robeck to break off the operation.

On 18 March, the Anglo-French fleet mounted a major attack on the Ottoman defences; Albion joined ten British battleships and one battlecruiser and four French battleships for the operation. The plan called for the battleships to enter the narrows and suppress the fortresses while minesweepers cleared paths in the Ottoman minefields. At the same time, transport ships outside the straits would conduct a demonstration to convince the Ottomans they were going to land troops; the Entente commanders hoped this would tie down the Ottoman mobile guns. The British ships initially succeeded in inflicting heavy damage on the fortresses, but the battleship Formidable and then Inflexible began taking serious damage from the coastal batteries. The French battleships also began to take damage, and the battleship Bouvet struck a mine and exploded. Albion and several other battleships attempted to suppress Ottoman guns firing on the boats that went to rescue Bouvet's crew.

She supported the main landings at V Beach at Cape Helles on 25 April 1915. Starting at around 04:30 on the morning of the landings, Albion bombarded the high ground overlooking the beach, but by around 05:30, heavy smoke and mist prevented her gunners from observing targets and so she ceased fire. After the Allied forces began to go ashore, Albion supported their advance on the village of Sedd el Bahr, but by around 07:30 had to check fire again, as friendly troops had entered the town. She then shifted fire to support the men going ashore at W Beach, but heavy Ottoman fire repulsed the landing and the Allied soldiers were forced to withdraw. As it turned out, the report of Allied troops in Sedd el Bahr proved to be erroneous, and further attacks were launched against the Ottoman defenders the following day, which Albion supported. After Albion knocked out a machine gun position on the south-west corner of the village, the troops were able to advance into the town and force the Ottomans to retreat.

On 28 April 1915 she took part in an attack on Krithia, led by five French battleships and supported by four other British battleships. Albion suffered significant damage from Ottoman shore batteries, forcing her to retire to Mudros for repairs, leaking badly. The repair work took three days to complete. Back in action on 2 May 1915, she again was hit by shells from Ottoman batteries on the Asian side of the straits, necessitating further repairs at Mudros. On the night of 22–23 May 1915, Albion beached on a sandbank off Gaba Tepe and came under heavy fire from Ottoman shore batteries. About 200 fragmentation shells hit her, but they could not penetrate her armour and did no serious damage, and Albion suffered fewer than a dozen casualties. After efforts were made to free her by reducing her weight and by using the recoil of firing her main guns simultaneously, her sister ship Canopus towed her to safety on 24 May 1915, Albion still firing at the Ottoman forts while being towed clear. Albion left the area for repairs on 26 May 1915 and underwent a refit at Malta in May–June 1915.

==== Later operations ====
In late September, after Bulgaria entered the war on the side of the Central Powers, Britain and France negotiated with Greece to allow an expeditionary force to debark at Salonika to attack Bulgaria. On 4 October 1915, Albion arrived at Salonika to become a unit of the 3rd Detached Squadron, tasked with assisting the French Navy in a blockade of the coasts of Greece and Bulgaria and with reinforcing the Suez Canal Patrol. She embarked the first British Army contingent of 1,500 troops for Salonika and escorted French troopships carrying the French second contingent. Albion served on the Salonika Station until April 1916, then became a guard ship at Queenstown, Ireland, later that month. In May 1916 she moved to Devonport for a refit; that completed, she moved on to the Humber in August 1916 for service as a guard ship there. In October 1918, Albion's service as a guard ship came to an end, and she was reduced to service as an accommodation ship. In August 1919, Albion was placed on the disposal list at Devonport. She was sold for scrapping on 11 December 1919. She left Devonport under her own steam on 3 January 1920, arriving at Morecambe for scrapping on 6 January 1920.
