= BL 10-inch Mk I – IV naval gun =

Ordnance BL 10 inch gun Mk I - IV
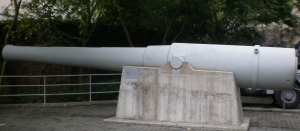
- Mk I coast defence gun, Hong Kong Museum of Coastal Defence
- Type: Naval gun Coast defence gun
- Place of origin: United Kingdom

Service history
- In service: 1885 - 1913
- Used by: Royal Navy

Production history
- Variants: Mk I, II, III, IV

Specifications
- Mass: Mk I : 32 tons barrel & breech Mks II - IV : 29 tons
- Barrel length: Mk I : 317.5 inches (8,064 mm) (31.75 calibres); Mks II - IV : 320 inches (8,128 mm) (32 calibres)
- Shell: 500 pounds (226.8 kg)
- Calibre: 10-inch (254.0 mm)
- Muzzle velocity: 2,040 feet per second (622 m/s)
- Maximum firing range: 10,000 yards (9,100 m)

The BL 10 inch guns Mks I, II, III, IV were British rifled breechloading 32-calibre naval and coast defence guns in service from 1885.

== History ==
The British 10-inch calibre originated with the Committee on Ordnance in 1879 when it ordered a new 10.4-inch gun together with the new 9.2-inch as part of its transition from muzzle-loading to breech-loading guns. The proposed 10.4-inch gun eventually went into service in 1885 as a 10-inch gun firing a 500-pound projectile.

After Mk IV of 1889 the Royal Navy discontinued the 10-inch calibre in favour of 9.2-inch and 12-inch.

== Naval service ==
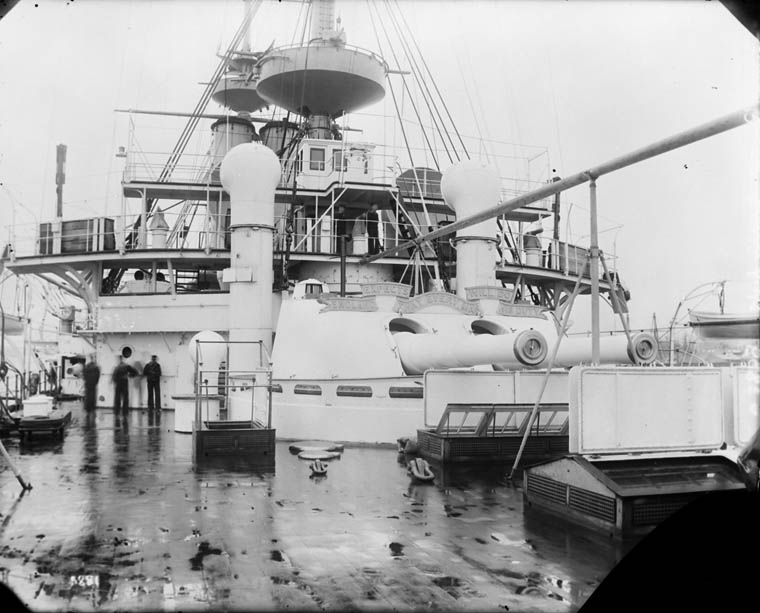
Aft guns of HMS Renown

Mks II, III and IV guns were interchangeable and equipped the following warships :

- Victoria-class battleships laid down in 1885
- Centurion-class battleships laid down in 1890
- Renown laid down in 1893
- Devastation-class battleships as re-gunned in 1890

=== 25-ton gun for Victoria ===
A 25-ton version with a barrel of 300 inches (30 calibres) and firing a 450-pound projectile was supplied in 1884 to the Australian colony of Victoria, mounted on the gunboat HMVS Victoria. This gun was subsequently replaced on Victoria by an 8-inch gun, and in 1887 was mounted at Fort Franklin as a coast defence gun.

== Coast defence gun ==
Mk I was an Elswick Ordnance design used only for coastal defence. Mks II, III and IV were interchangeable Woolwich Arsenal designs used on warships but also for coastal defense around the British Empire, some on disappearing carriages.

== See also ==
- List of naval guns

== Surviving examples ==
- Hong Kong Museum of Coastal Defence
- Portsea, Victoria, Australia
- Fort McNab, Halifax, Nova Scotia, Canada

== Bibliography ==
- Text Book of Gunnery, 1902. London: Printed for His Majesty's Stationery Office, by Harrison and Sons, St. Martin's Lane
- I. V.Hogg & L. F. Thurston, British Artillery Weapons & Ammunition 1914-1918. London: Ian Allan, 1972.
- Tony DiGiulian, British 10"/32 (25.4 cm) Marks I, II, III and IV
