= Motherbank =

Coordinates: 50.766°N 1.216°W

The naval review - The flotilla of gunboats off the Motherbank, by Richard Principal Leitch, from The Illustrated London News, May 3, 1856, Page 469.

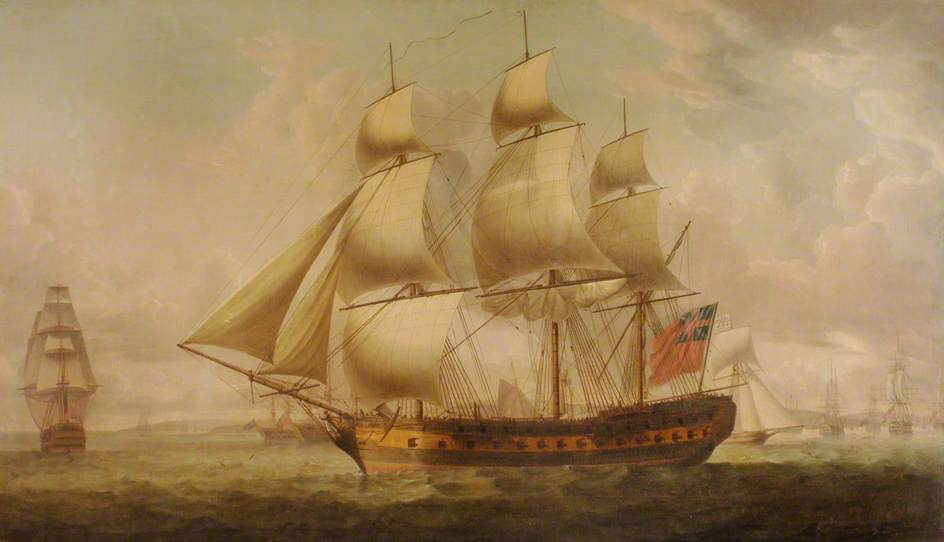
Cuffnells, an East India Company ship, at the Motherbank. (Painting The Cuffnells at the Mother Bank (1796) by Robert Dodd).

The Motherbank is a shallow sandbar off the northeast coast of the Isle of Wight in England. It lies in the Solent between Cowes and Ryde. (Note: 'Adjacent to Spithead, on the coast of the Isle of Wight, near the eastern extremity of the island, is the bay of St. Helen’s, a place of rendezvous for the navy ; and near the coast of the Isle of Wight, between Cowes and Ryde, is the Motherbank, an anchorage for smaller vessels.')

The Motherbank is located near historically significant ports and anchorages such as Portsmouth, Spithead, Southampton, and St. Helen's Bay, and has long served as an important anchorage itself. Merchant ships have anchored at the Motherbank for centuries. (Note: PORTSMOUTH, the second marine arsenal of England, is entered through the road named Spithead... The Mother Bank is a part of the road near the Isle of Wight where East Indiamen anchor as well as ships of war under quarantine.)

The Royal Navy for many years anchored old, decommissioned warships at the Motherbank while they awaited disposal. An old warship might be anchored there for anything between several weeks and several years before being sold, scrapped or sunk as a target.
