= 2000–01 Hong Kong League Cup =

Hong Kong League Cup 2000–01 is the 1st staging of the Hong Kong League Cup.

The 8 teams in Hong Kong First Division League participated in the competition and Happy Valley won the first title of this competition by winning 2-1 against Sun Hei under golden goal rule. It received a HK$125,000 champion prize.

== Format ==
The teams were drawn into 2 groups (4 teams in a group). Each team plays 2 matches against the other teams in its group. The top two teams in each group qualified for the semi-finals while the bottom two teams entered the 5th to 8th-place position matches.

== Group stage ==
=== Group A ===
Team	Pts	Pld	W	D	L	GF	GA	GD
Sun Hei	13	6	4	1	1	10	6	4
Happy Valley	12	6	4	0	2	10	6	4
Orient & Yee Hope Union	7	6	2	1	3	8	9	-1
Po Chai Pills	3	6	1	0	5	2	9	3

2000-11-30
20:00

Orient & Yee Hope Union	1 – 2	Sun Hei

Mong Kok Stadium
Attendance: 893

2000-11-30
17:45

Happy Valley	3 – 0	Po Chai Pills

Mong Kok Stadium
Attendance: 893

16 December 2000

Happy Valley	2-1	Orient & Yee Hope Union

20 December 2000

Orient & Yee Hope Union	3-2	Happy Valley

20 December 2000

Po Chai Pills	1-2	Sun Hei

2000-12-24
13:00

Po Chai Pills	0 – 1	Happy Valley
		Ritchie

Tuen Mun Tang Shiu Kin Sports Ground
Attendance: 661

2000-12-24
15:15

Sun Hei	2 – 2	Orient & Yee Hope Union
John Moore; Lau Chi Keung		Chan Ho Man 83'; Leandro 87'

Mong Kok Stadium
Attendance: 1,825

27 December 2000

Orient & Yee Hope Union	0-1	Po Chai Pills

2000-12-28

Happy Valley	2 – 1	Sun Hei
Ritchie; Chan Chi Hong		Cornelius 1'

Mong Kok Stadium

2001-01-02

Sun Hei	2 – 0	Po Chai Pills
Ricardo 6'; Cornelius 46'

Mong Kok Stadium

2001-02-03
15:15

Sun Hei	1 – 0	Happy Valley
Moore 72'

Mong Kok Stadium
Attendance: 828

2001-02-03
13:00

Po Chai Pills	0 – 1	Orient & Yee Hope Union
		Watson 55'

Mong Kok Stadium
Attendance: 828

=== Group B ===
Team	Pts	Pld	W	D	L	GF	GA	GD
South China	16	6	5	1	0	19	6	13
Instant-Dict	9	6	2	3	1	14	9	5
Rangers	4	6	1	1	4	5	17	-12
Kitchee	3	6	0	3	3	6	12	-6

2000-11-30
20:00

Instant-Dict	1 – 1	Kitchee
Tam Siu Wai 40' (pen.)		Ho Chi Wing 3'

Siu Sai Wan Sports Ground

16 December 2000

Instant-Dict	3-1	Rangers

16 December 2000

Kitchee	0-2	South China

2000-12-19

Kitchee	0 – 1	Rangers
		Law Chun Bong 90+'

Hong Kong Stadium
Attendance: 973

2000-12-19

Instant-Dict	3 – 3	South China
Putiray 45+' 51'; Cheung Yiu Lun 70'		Zinho 7'; Au Wai Lun 23' 53'

Hong Kong Stadium
Attendance: 973

2000-12-24
15:15

Kitchee	1 – 1	Instant-Dict
Lo Chi Fung		Cheng Siu Chung

Tuen Mun Tang Shiu Kin Sports Ground
Attendance: 661

2000-12-24
13:00

Rangers	0 – 2	South China
		Gavrilović

Mong Kok Stadium
Attendance: 1,825

27 December 2000

Rangers	0-6	Instant-Dict

2000-12-28

South China	5 – 2	Kitchee
Au Wai Lun; Yeung Ching Kwong; Leung Chi Kui 88'		Ho Chi Wing; Chow Man Ho

Mong Kok Stadium

2009-01-02

South China	4 – 1	Rangers
Zinho 36'; Gavrilović		Chan Wai Ho 44'

Mong Kok Stadium

2001-02-02

Rangers	2 – 2	Kitchee

Mong Kok Stadium
Attendance: 1,299

2001-02-02

South China	3 – 0	Instant-Dict
Zinho; Ornelas

Mong Kok Stadium
Attendance: 1,299

== Knockout stage ==
All times are Hong Kong Time (UTC+8).

=== 5th to 8th place position matches ===
2001-02-08

Orient & Yee Hope Union	2 – 1	Kitchee

Tsing Yi Sports Ground

2001-02-08

Rangers	1 – 1 (a.e.t.)	Po Chai Pills
Penalties
	5 – 3

Tsing Yi Sports Ground

=== Semi-finals ===
2001-02-08

Sun Hei	0 – 0 (a.e.t.)	Instant-Dict
Penalties
Moore (penalty scored)	4 – 2	(penalty missed) Kim Pan-Gon; (penalty missed) Ng Wai Chiu

Mong Kok Stadium
Attendance: 4,939

2001-02-08

Happy Valley	1 – 0	South China
Ritchie 54'

Mong Kok Stadium
Attendance: 4,939

=== Seventh-place match ===
2001-03-13

Kitchee	1 – 0	Po Chai Pills
Cheung Yiu Chung 3' (o.g.)

Mong Kok Stadium

=== Fifth-place match ===
2001-03-13

Orient & Yee Hope Union	3 – 0	Rangers
Poon Man Chun 2'; Roddie 13'; Luk Koon Pong 18'

Mong Kok Stadium

=== Third-place match ===
2001-04-15
13:00

Instant-Dict	3 – 1	South China

Mong Kok Stadium
Attendance: 3,078

=== Final ===
2001-04-15
15:15

Happy Valley	2 – 1 (a.e.t.)	Sun Hei
Carlos 90+'; Chan Chi Hong 100'		Lo Chi Kwan 49'

Mong Kok Stadium
Attendance: 3,078

== Results ==
Position	Team
1st	Happy Valley
2nd	Sun Hei
3rd	Instant-Dict
4th	South China
5th	Orient & Yee Hope Union
6th	Rangers
7th	Kitchee
8th	Po Chai Pills
