= Shum Kwok Pui =

Hong Kong footballer (born 1970)

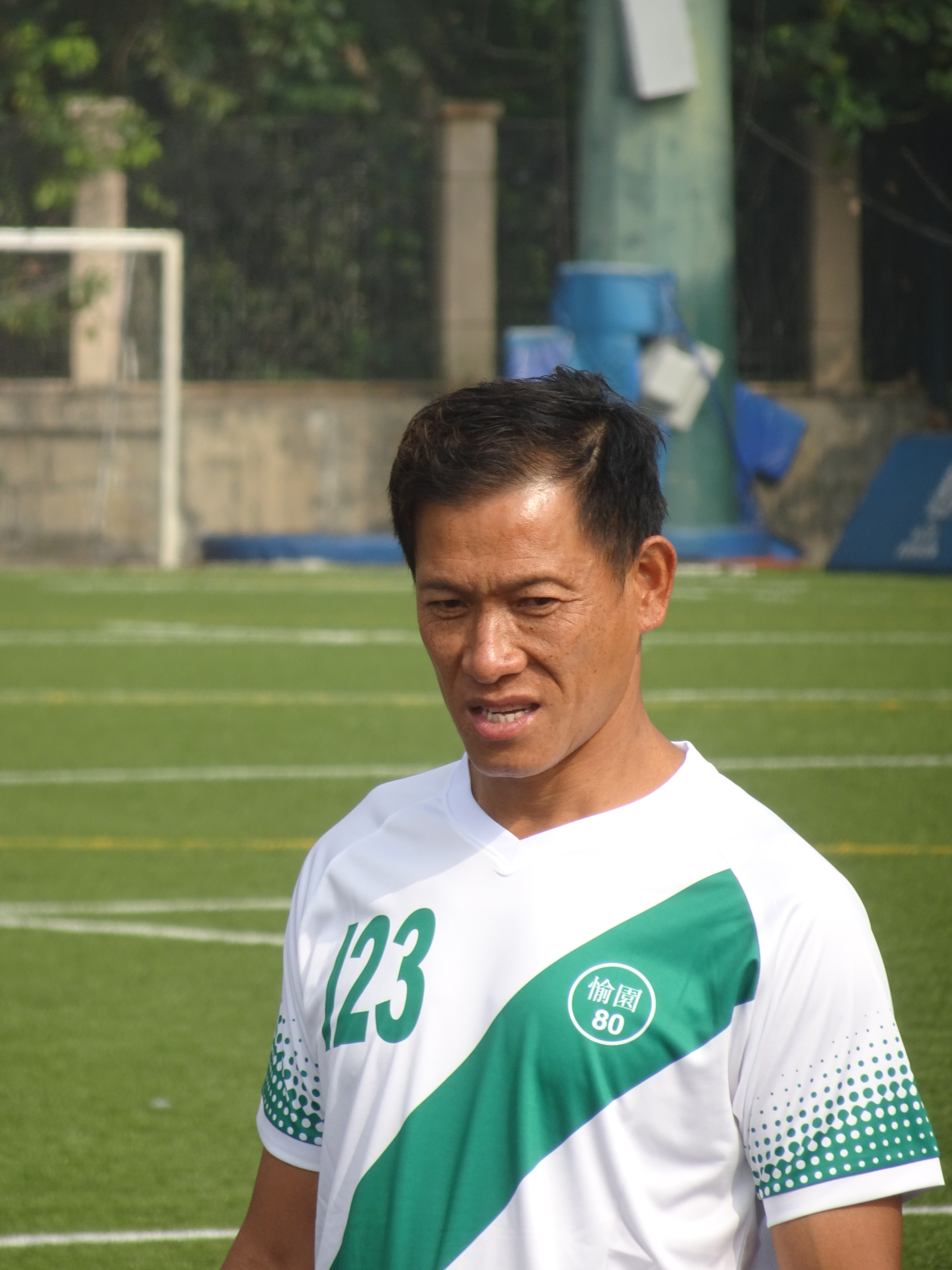

Personal information
- Full name: Shum Kwok Pui
- Date of birth: 11 August 1970 (age 56)
- Place of birth: Hong Kong
- Height: 1.75 m (5 ft 9 in)
- Positions: Defensive midfielder; centre back

Youth career
- 1986–1989: South China

Senior career*
Years	Team	Apps	(Gls)
1989–2005	South China		
1991–1992	→ Kui Tan (loan)		
2006–2007	Shek Kip Mei		(2)
2007–2008	Eastern	11	(0)

International career
1992–2000	Hong Kong	16	(0)

Managerial career
- 2007–2008: Eastern (assistant coach)
- 2008–2011: Pegasus (assistant coach)
- 2014–2016: South China (U18 coach)
- 2016–2019: Happy Valley
- 2019–2021: Happy Valley (assistant coach)
- * Club domestic league appearances and goals

Shum Kwok Pui (Chinese: 岑國培; Jyutping: sam^{4} gwok^{3} pui^{4}; born 11 August 1970) is a Hong Kong former professional footballer who played as a centre back.

== Coaching career ==
=== Pegasus ===
Shum joined Pegasus in 2008 as an assistant coach. He left the club by mutual consent in June 2011.

=== South China ===
As part of a partnership with Chelsea Soccer School, Sham returned to South China as the coach of the U-18 squad.

=== Happy Valley ===
South China decided to end their partnership with Chelsea after the 2015-16 season. As a result, Chelsea found a new partner in Happy Valley with which to loan their students. Sham decided to follow Chelsea and was named the manager at Happy Valley in September 2016.

On 15 July 2019, Shum ceded his head coaching duties to Pau Ka Yiu while remaining with Happy Valley as an assistant.

== Career statistics ==
=== International ===
Appearances and goals by national team and year
National team	Year	Apps	Goals
Hong Kong	1992	1	0
Hong Kong	1993	5	0
Hong Kong	1994	3	0
Hong Kong	1995	–	
Hong Kong	1996	1	0
Hong Kong	1997	1	0
Hong Kong	1998	2	0
Hong Kong	1999	1	0
Hong Kong	2000	2	0
Total		16	0

== Honours ==
Eastern

- Hong Kong Senior Shield: 2007–08

South China AA

- Hong Kong First Division

1989–90, 1990–91, 1996–97, 1999–2000

- Hong Kong Senior Shield

1990–91, 1995–96, 1996–97, 1998–99, 1999–2000, 2001–02, 2002–03

- Hong Kong FA Cup

1989–90, 1990–91, 1995–96, 1998–99, 2001–02

- Hong Kong League Cup

2001–02

- Hong Kong Viceroy Cup

1990–91, 1992–93, 1993–94, 1997–98
