= Leslie Santos =

Hong Kong footballer (born 1967)

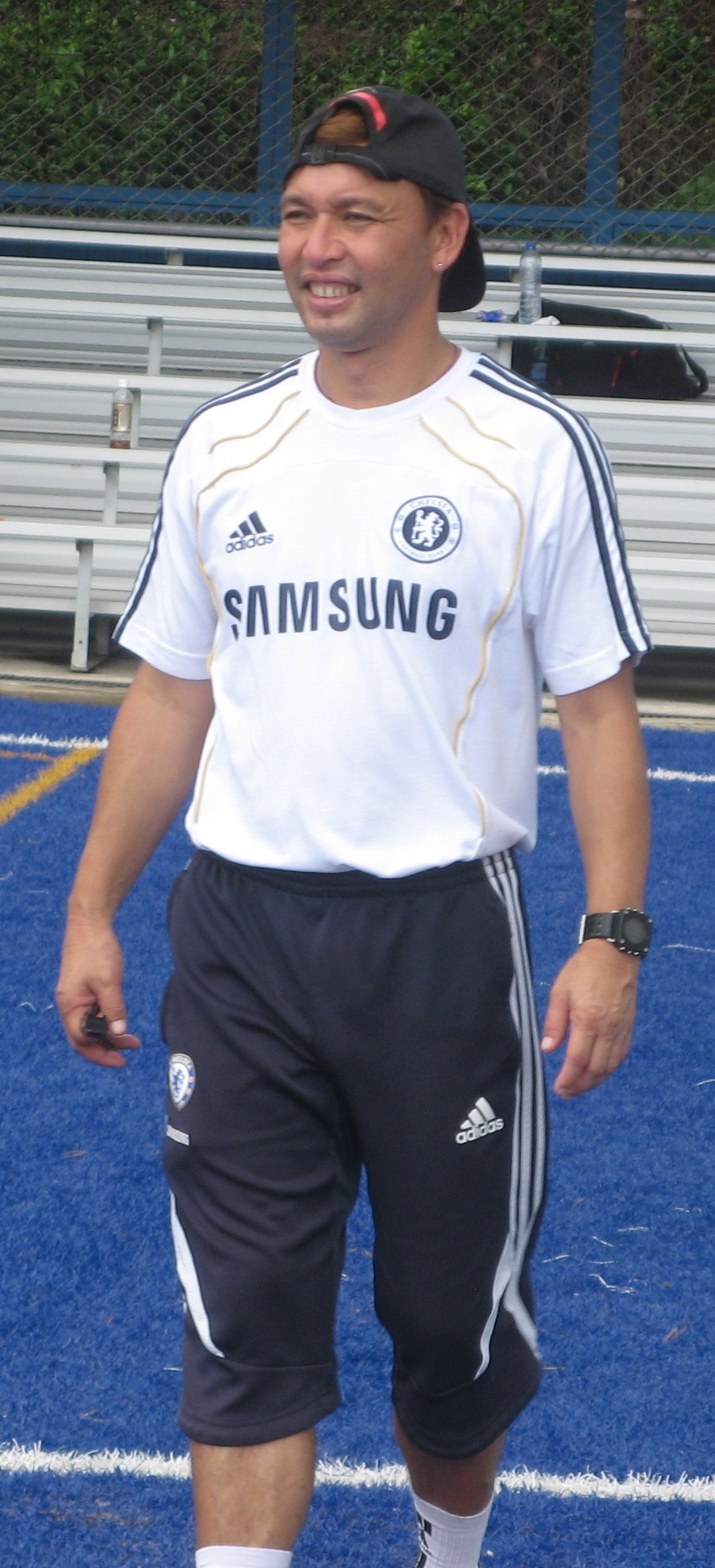

Personal information
- Full name: Leslie George Santos
- Date of birth: 20 July 1967 (age 59)
- Place of birth: British Hong Kong
- Height: 1.67 m (5 ft 6 in)
- Position: Attacking midfielder

Youth career
- 1982: HKSI
- 1983: South China

Senior career*
Years	Team	Apps	(Gls)
1983–1997	South China		
1997–2002	Sun Hei		
2009	Tai Chung		

International career
1987–2000	Hong Kong		

Managerial career
- 2002–2009: Sun Hei (assistant coach)
- 2009: Sun Hei
- * Club domestic league appearances and goals

Leslie George Santos (Chinese: 山度士, born 20 July 1967) is a Hong Kong former professional footballer who played as an attacking midfielder. He is of Portuguese and British descent.

== Career ==
During his peak (1983–1997), Santos played for South China. His career was disrupted by two cruciate ligament injuries to his left knee after tearing it in the final match of the 1992–93 season against British Forces which sidelined him for eight months, and then tearing it again during a league match against Sing Tao in 1993–94 after a heavy tackle by Ian Docker which took 3 years for rehabilitation. He was twice awarded Footballer of the year and he rounded off his career with Sun Hei.

Santos took over as coach for Sun Hei in the 2008–09 Hong Kong League Cup and took them to victory in the final over Pegasus where they won 6-4 on penalties after the match finished 2–2, thus ending his coaching career in glory. Santos was award Best Coach of the Year for this victory. Santos was surprised by the award because he only coached for a short time.

== Honours ==
- Hong Kong First Division

1985–86, 1986–87, 1987–88, 1989–90, 1990–91, 1991–92, 1996–97

- Hong Kong Senior Shield

1985–86, 1987–88, 1988–89, 1990–91, 1995–96, 1996–97

- Hong Kong FA Cup

1984–85, 1986–87, 1987–88, 1989–90, 1990–91, 1995–96

- Hong Kong Viceroy Cup

1986–87, 1987–88, 1990–91, 1992–93, 1993–94

== Retirement ==
He is now a columnist for the Oriental Daily newspaper and runs his own soccer academy named after himself, known as Santos Soccer Training Limited Hong Kong. In December 2009, the school reached a long-term agreement with Chelsea FC in 2009 to develop its first-ever Soccer School in Asia to provide football and charity opportunities to children. The school is now known as Chelsea FC Soccer School (HK). It is based in Lam Tin, Kowloon with its own Blue Pitch training ground. They also have a new campus in Kwun Tong. In 2020, Leslie Santos was interviewed by the South China Morning Post to speak about the impact of the COVID-19 pandemic on his Soccer School.

== Personal life ==
Santos is married and on 29 August 2011, his wife gave birth to a daughter. This was his second daughter.

Awards
Preceded by Lee Kin Wo; Lee Fuk Wing	Hong Kong First Division League Best Young Player Award (with Chiu Chung Man); 1987–88	Succeeded by Chiu Chung Man; Choi Chi Ping
