= Tam Siu Wai =

Hong Kong footballer (born 1970)

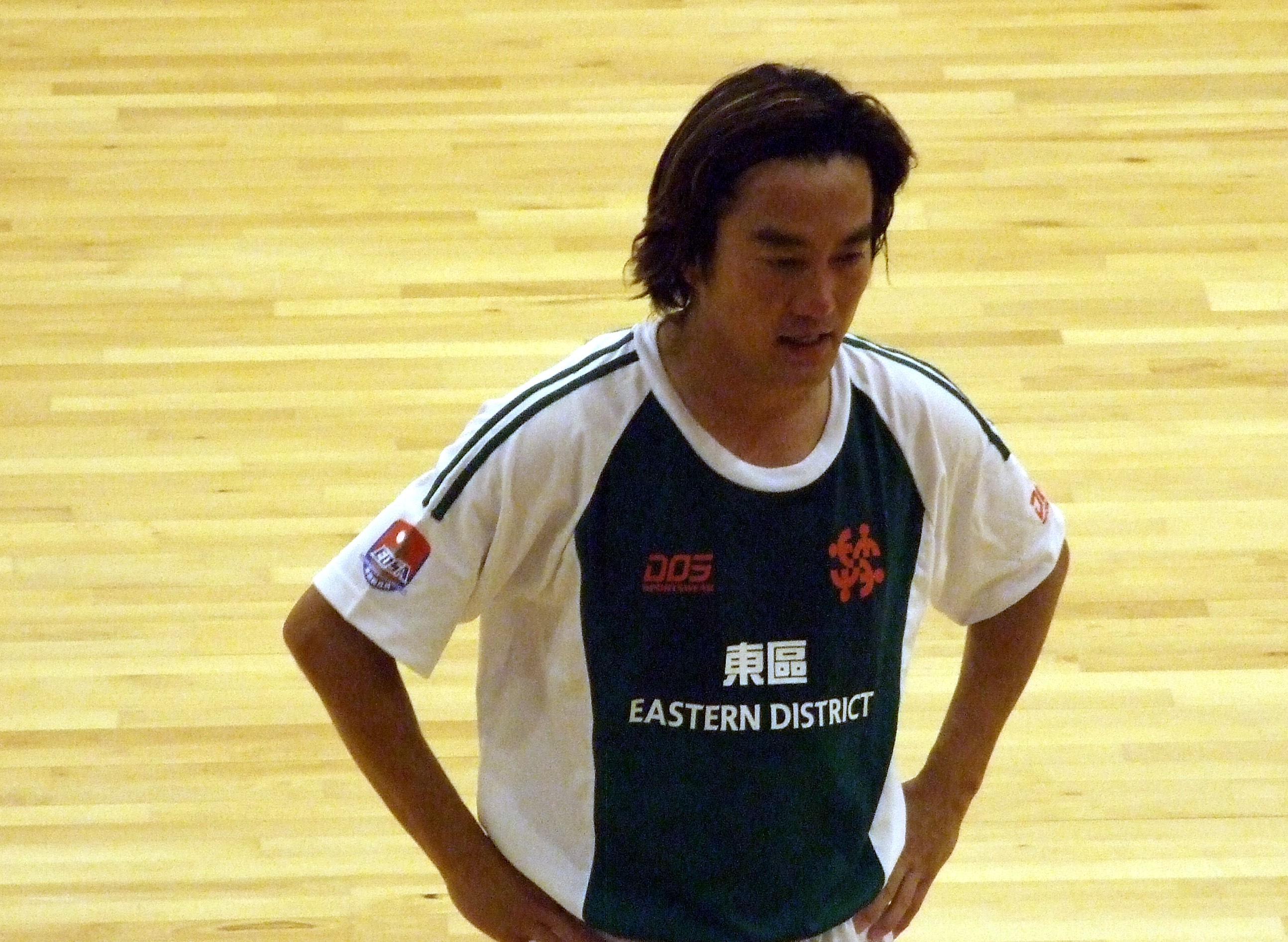
- Tam Siu Wai in 2011

Personal information
- Full name: Tam Siu Wai
- Date of birth: 17 September 1970 (age 56)
- Place of birth: Hong Kong
- Height: 1.73 m (5 ft 8 in)
- Position: Attacking midfielder

Youth career
- Lai Sun

Senior career*
Years	Team	Apps	(Gls)
1991–1994	Eastern		
1994–1996	Hong Kong Rangers		
1996–2001	Instant-Dict		
2001–2003	Hong Kong Rangers		
2003–2004	Sun Hei	10	(2)
2004–2008	Kitchee	24	(3)
2008–2009	Fourway	8	(1)
2009–2010	Mutual	12	(1)
2010–2011	Happy Valley	1	(0)
2021–2022	King Mountain		

International career^{‡}
1983–1989	Hong Kong U-20		
1989–1991	Hong Kong U-23		
1990–1999	Hong Kong	23	(1)

Managerial career
- 2008–2009: Fourway (assistant coach)
- * Club domestic league appearances and goals as of 12 July 2008 ‡ National team caps and goals as of 17 March 2008

Tam Siu Wai (Chinese: 譚兆偉; Jyutping: taam^{4} siu^{6} wai^{5}; born 17 September 1970) is a Hong Kong former professional footballer who played as an attacking midfielder.

== Honours ==
=== Club ===
Eastern

- Hong Kong First Division League: 1992–93, 1993–94
- Hong Kong Senior Shield: 1992–93, 1993–94
- Hong Kong FA Cup: 1992–93, 1993–94

Rangers

- Hong Kong Senior Shield: 1994–95
- Hong Kong FA Cup: 1994–95

Instant-Dict

- Hong Kong First Division League: 1997–98
- Hong Kong FA Cup: 1996–97, 1997–98, 2000–01

Sun Hei

- Hong Kong First Division League: 2003–04
- Hong Kong League Cup: 2003–04

Kitchee

- Hong Kong League Cup: 2005–06, 2006–07
- Hong Kong Senior Shield: 2005–06
