= Yau Kin Wai =

Hong Kong footballer (born 1973)

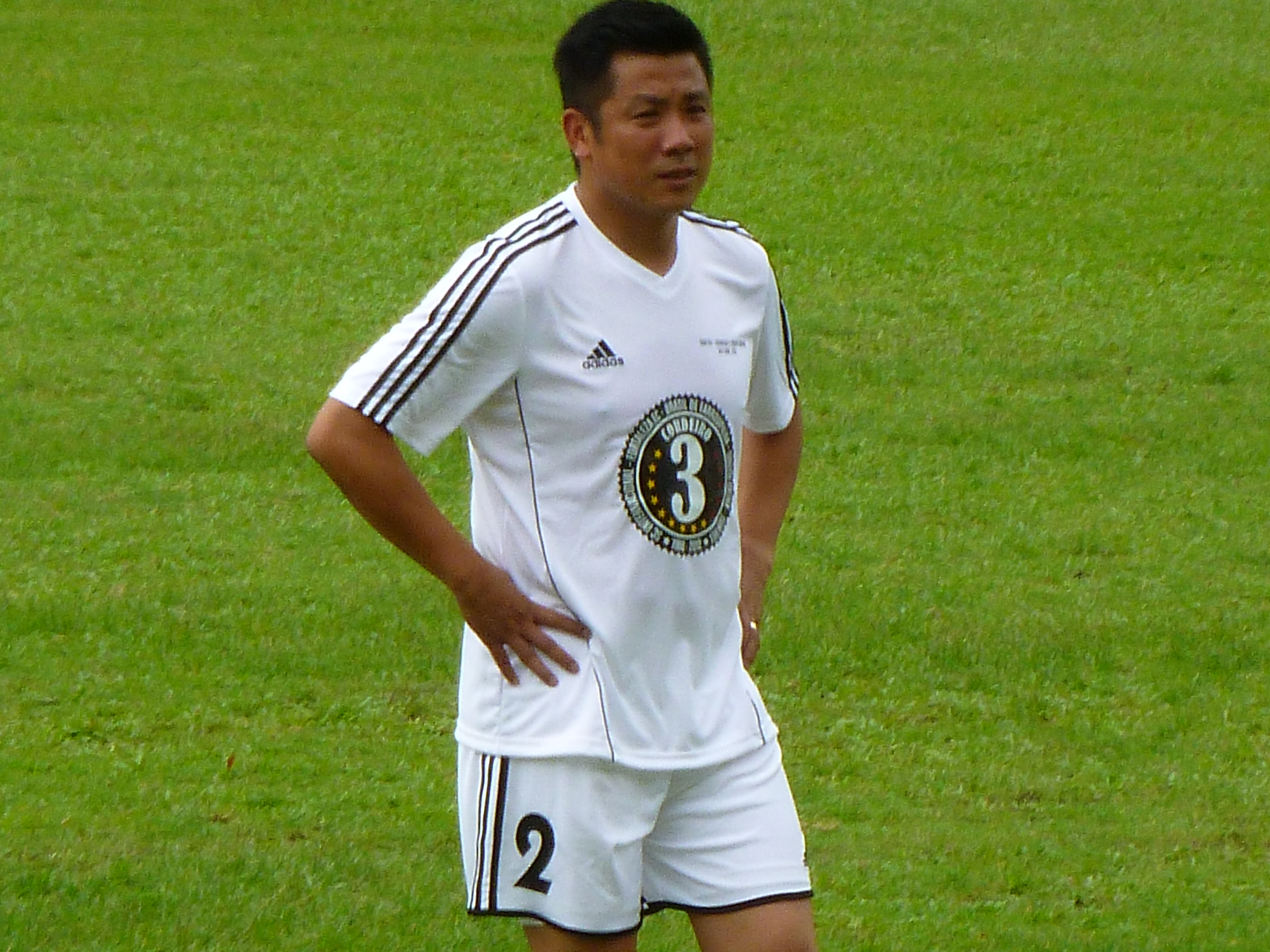
- Yau in 2012

Personal information
- Date of birth: 4 January 1973 (age 53)
- Place of birth: British Hong Kong
- Height: 1.76 m (5 ft 9 in)
- Position: Defender

Senior career*
Years	Team	Apps	(Gls)
1991–1992	Kui Tan		
1992–1994	Kitchee		
1994–2005	South China		

International career
1995–2003	Hong Kong	38	(7)
- * Club domestic league appearances and goals

Yau Kin Wai (Chinese: 丘健威; Jyutping: jau^{1} gin^{6} wai^{1}; born 4 January 1973) is a Hong Kong former professional footballer who played as a defender.

== Club career ==
Yau had played for Hong Kong First Division League club South China for more than 10 years and is regarded as one of the most decorated defenders in Hong Kong. He had been voted as the Hong Kong Footballer of the Year in the 1998–99 season and had been voted as Hong Kong Top Footballers for 6 times.

Yau retired from professional football at the end of the 2004–05 season.

== Personal life ==
After retirement, Yau concentrated his career as a soccer commentator and in youth development. He is now a soccer commentator of Cable TV and mostly commentating Premier League matches.

== Honours ==
South China

- Hong Kong First Division: 1996–97, 1999–2000
- Hong Kong Senior Shield: 1995–96, 1996–97, 1998–99, 1999–2000, 2001–02, 2002–03
- Hong Kong FA Cup: 1995–96, 1998–99, 2001–02

Individual

- Hong Kong Footballer of the Year: 1999

Preceded by Tam Siu Wai; Wong Chi Keung	Hong Kong First Division League Best Youth Player Award (with Tam Siu Wai); 1991–92	Succeeded by Chung Ho Yin; Lo Kai Wah
Preceded by Chung Ho Yin; Lo Kai Wah	Hong Kong First Division League Best Youth Player Award (with Yeung Hei Chi); 1993–94	Succeeded by Ng Chun Chung; Kwok Yue Hung
