= Cheng Siu Chung =

Hong Kong footballer (born 1972)

Cheng Siu Chung 鄭兆聰
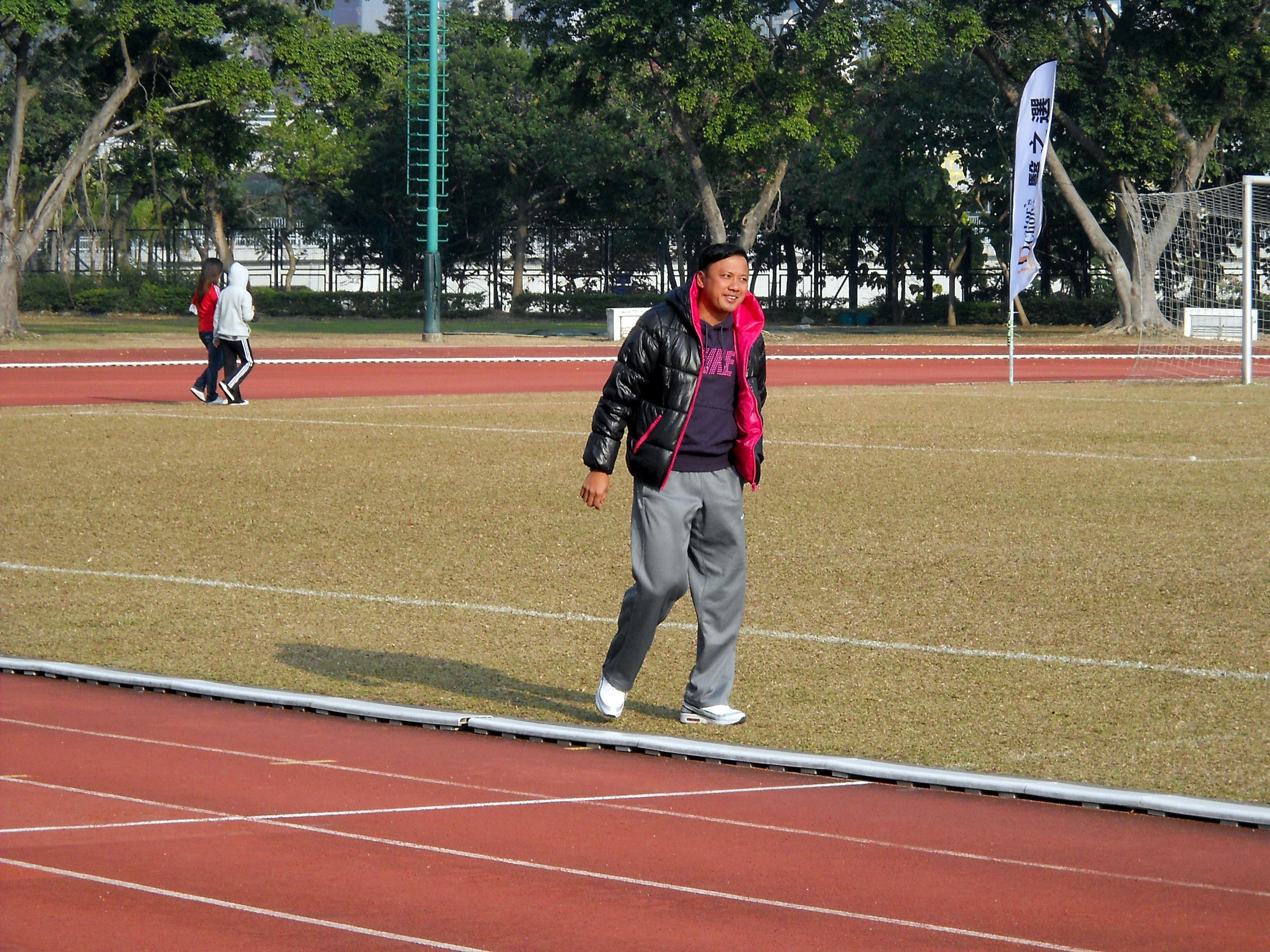
- Cheng Siu Chung in 2011

Personal information
- Full name: Cheng Siu Chung
- Date of birth: 29 September 1972 (age 54)
- Place of birth: Hong Kong
- Height: 5 ft 9 in (1.75 m)
- Position: Striker

Team information
- Current team: Southern (Technical director)

Senior career*
Years	Team	Apps	(Gls)
1989–1990	CS Uruguay		
1990–1993	Alajuelense		
1993–1994	→ Happy Valley (loan)		
1994–1995	Eastern		
1996	South China		
1996–1998	Instant-Dict		
1998–2000	South China		
2000–2001	Instant-Dict		
2001–2002	South China		
2002–2003	Happy Valley	11	(1)
2003–2005	Kitchee	5	(1)
2006–2010	Southern	4	(0)

International career
1988–1991	Costa Rica U20	9	(6)
1997–2000	Hong Kong	8	(7)

Managerial career
- 2006–2008: Southern
- 2009–2015: Kitchee (assistant coach)
- 2015–2020: Southern
- 2021–2022: Southern (technical director)
- 2022–2023: Southern
- 2023–: Southern (technical director)
- * Club domestic league appearances and goals as of 3 June 2023

Cheng Siu Chung (Chinese: 鄭兆聰; Cantonese Yale: Jehng Siuhchūng; born 29 September 1972) is a Hong Kong football manager and former professional footballer. He is currently the technical director of Hong Kong Premier League club Southern.

He served as a commentator for the 2010 FIFA World Cup for the Cantonese subscription television network, Astro Wah Lai Toi.

== Club career ==
Cheng moved to Costa Rica when he was 8 years old along with his parents and sister, and is fluent in Spanish and English as well as his native Cantonese. His father, Cheng Kwok Kan, was a famous footballer in Hong Kong who played for Happy Valley before moving to Costa Rica. Cheng started his career in Costa Rica where he also represented Costa Rica for the youth level.

In 1994, Alajuelense sold Cheng to Eastern for a then record transfer fee of HK$234,000. It has been the highest transfer fee record in Hong Kong First Division League. The record stood until 2007 when South China bought Chan Wai Ho from Hong Kong Rangers by HK$400,000.

== Managerial career ==
While serving a coach at Kitchee, also played for Southern which at the time were in the Hong Kong Third District Division League.

On 7 May 2015, Kitchee announced on Facebook that Cheng had been hired by Southern as their new manager after the district club announced that they would seek a license to compete in the 2015-16 Hong Kong Premier League.

After five seasons, Cheng departed Southern on 16 March 2020 after a falling out with Southern's upper management. He failed to win any trophies for Southern during his spell with the club.

On 13 June 2022, Cheng returned to Southern as the club's new head coach.

On 3 June 2023, Cheng changed his role as the technical director of Southern.

== Honours ==
=== Player ===
==== Club ====
Alajuelense

- Liga FPD: 1991, 1992

Eastern

- Hong Kong First Division: 1994–95

Instant-Dict

- Hong Kong First Division: 1997–98
- Hong Kong FA Cup: 1996–97, 1997–98, 2000–01

South China

- Hong Kong First Division: 1999–2000
- Hong Kong Senior Shield: 1998–99, 1999–2000, 2001–02
- Hong Kong FA Cup: 1998–99, 2001–02

Happy Valley

- Hong Kong First Division: 2002–03

==== Individual ====
- Hong Kong Footballer of the Year: 1996

=== Assistant manager ===
Kitchee

- Hong Kong Premier League: 2014–15
- Hong Kong First Division: 2010–11, 2011–12, 2013–14
- Hong Kong FA Cup: 2011–12, 2012–13, 2014–15
- Hong Kong League Cup: 2011–12, 2014–15
