= Lau Chi Keung =

Hong Kong footballer and coach

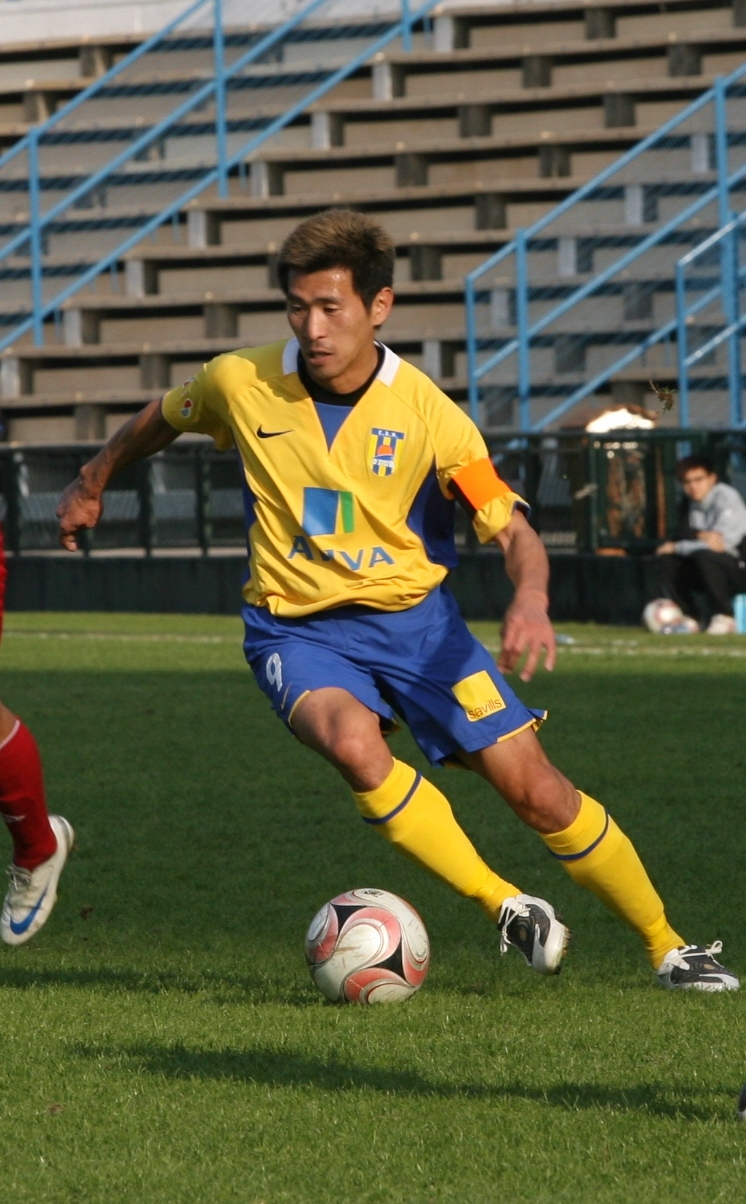

Personal information
- Full name: Lau Chi Keung Sanvel
- Date of birth: 7 January 1977 (age 49)
- Place of birth: Hong Kong
- Height: 1.77 m (5 ft 10 in)
- Position: Defensive midfielder

Senior career*
Years	Team	Apps	(Gls)
1995–1997	Instant-Dict		
1997–1998	→ Sun Hei (loan)		
1998–2011	Sun Hei		
2011–2012	Kam Fung		
2012–2013	Yuen Long		
2013	Kwai Tsing		
2014	Yau Tsim Mong		
2014–2016	Sun Hei	19	(3)

International career
1999	Hong Kong U-23		
1999–2007	Hong Kong	32	(3)

Managerial career
- 2016–2018: Sun Hei
- 2018–2019: Double Flower
- 2019–2020: Tai Po (assistant coach)
- * Club domestic league appearances and goals

Sanvel Lau Chi Keung (Chinese: 劉志強; Jyutping: lau^{4} zi^{3} koeng^{4}; born 7 January 1977) is a Hong Kong former professional football player.

== Managerial career ==
Lau retired from football after the 2015-16 season and took over as manager of Sun Hei. In his first season as manager, he led the club to the 2016–17 Hong Kong First Division title.

== Honours ==
=== Club ===
Double Flower

- Hong Kong First Division League: 1995–96
- Viceroy Cup: 1995–96
- Hong Kong FA Cup: 1996–97

Sun Hei

- Hong Kong First Division: 2001–02, 2003–04, 2004–05, 2016–17
- Hong Kong Senior Shield: 2004–05
- Hong Kong FA Cup: 2002–03, 2004–05, 2005–06
- Hong Kong League Cup: 2002–03, 2004–05, 2005–06

Kam Fung

- Hong Kong Second Division: 2011–12

Yuen Long

- Hong Kong Second Division: 2012–13
