= 2002–03 Hong Kong League Cup =

Hong Kong League Cup 2002–03 is the 3rd staging of the Hong Kong League Cup.

Sun Hei got their first champion in this competition by winning an aggregate 6-4 against Happy Valley in the final. The team got HK$50,000 as championship prize.

== Group stage ==
All times are Hong Kong Time (UTC+8).

=== Group A ===
Team	Pts	Pld	W	D	L	GF	GA	GD
Buler Rangers	7	3	2	1	0	5	1	4
Happy Valley	4	3	1	1	1	3	2	1
Xiangxue Pharmaceutical	3	3	1	0	2	2	4	-2
Fukien	3	3	1	0	2	2	5	-3

2002-11-29
18:00

Buler Rangers	3 – 0	Fukien
Anílton; Akosah; Kim Pan-Gon	Report (Chinese)

Mong Kok Stadium
2002-11-29
20:00

Happy Valley	2 – 0	Xiangxue Pharmaceutical
Gerard 86'; Leung Shing Kit 90+'	Report (Chinese)

Mong Kok Stadium

2002-12-10
18:00

Fukien	1 – 2	Xiangxue Pharmaceutical
Lee Sze Ming	Report (Chinese)	Liu Xing

Mong Kok Stadium
Attendance: 620
2002-12-10
20:00

Happy Valley	1 – 1	Buler Rangers
Gerard 41'	Report (Chinese)	Man Pei Tak 57'

Mong Kok Stadium
Attendance: 620

2002-12-14
13:15

Xiangxue Pharmaceutical	0 – 1	Buler Rangers
	Report (Chinese)	Akosah

Mong Kok Stadium
2002-12-14
15:15

Happy Valley	0 – 1	Fukien
	Report (Chinese)	So Loi Keung 69'

Mong Kok Stadium

=== Group B ===
Team	Pts	Pld	W	D	L	GF	GA	GD
South China	9	3	3	0	0	8	1	7
Sun Hei	6	3	2	0	1	10	3	7
Double Flower	1	3	0	1	2	3	7	-4
HKFC	1	3	0	1	2	4	14	-10

2002-12-01
13:15

South China	4 – 1	HKFC
Chan Chi Hong; Au Wai Lun; Chan Ho Man; Yeung Ching Kwong 84'		Lai Chun Kit

Siu Sai Wan Sports Ground
Attendance: 367
2002-12-01
15:15

Sun Hei	2 – 1	Double Flower
Márcio 76' (pen.); Wong Chun Yue 82'		Tsang Ho Wan 70'

Siu Sai Wan Sports Ground
Attendance: 367

2002-12-08

Double Flower	0 – 3	South China
	Report (Chinese)	Sham Kwok Pui 52' 66'; Ng Wai Chiu 64'

Mong Kok Stadium
Attendance: 690
2002-12-08

Sun Hei	8 – 1	HKFC
Chu Siu Kei; Márcio; Cornelius; Ricardo		van der Sander

Mong Kok Stadium
Attendance: 690

12 December 2002

HKFC	2-2	Double Flower

12 December 2002

Sun Hei	0-1	South China

== Knockout stage ==
=== Bracket ===
Semifinals
A1	Buler Rangers	2
B2	Sun Hei	4
B1	South China	1
A2	Happy Valley	3

Finals
B2	Sun Hei (PSO)	2 (4)
A2	Happy Valley	2 (2)

Hong Kong League Cup 2002–03 Winner

Sun Hei
First Title

=== Semi-finals ===
2003-01-23
18:00

Buler Rangers	2 – 4	Sun Hei
Anílton 68'; Akosah 81'	Report; Report (Chinese)	Cornelius; Ricardo 32'; Law Chun Bong 48'

Mong Kok Stadium

2003-01-23
20:00

Happy Valley	3 – 1	South China
Gerard 28'; Leung Shing Kit 83' (pen.); Keith 87'	Report; Report (Chinese)	Au Wai Lun 63'

Mong Kok Stadium

=== Final ===
2003-01-26
15:00

Happy Valley	2 –2 (a.e.t.)	Sun Hei
Araujo 4'; Keith 30'	Report; Report (Chinese)	Ricardo 1'; Chu Siu Kei 50'
Penalties
Lai Kai Cheuk (penalty missed); Cheng Siu Chung (penalty missed)	2 – 4

Hong Kong Stadium
Attendance: 1,093

== Trivia ==
- Lai Kai Cheuk and Cheng Siu Chung Ricky of Happy Valley were the only players who missed in the penalty shootout of the final. Chan Ka Ki of Sun Hei saved both shots.
