= Kim Pan-gon =

South Korean football manager (born 1969)

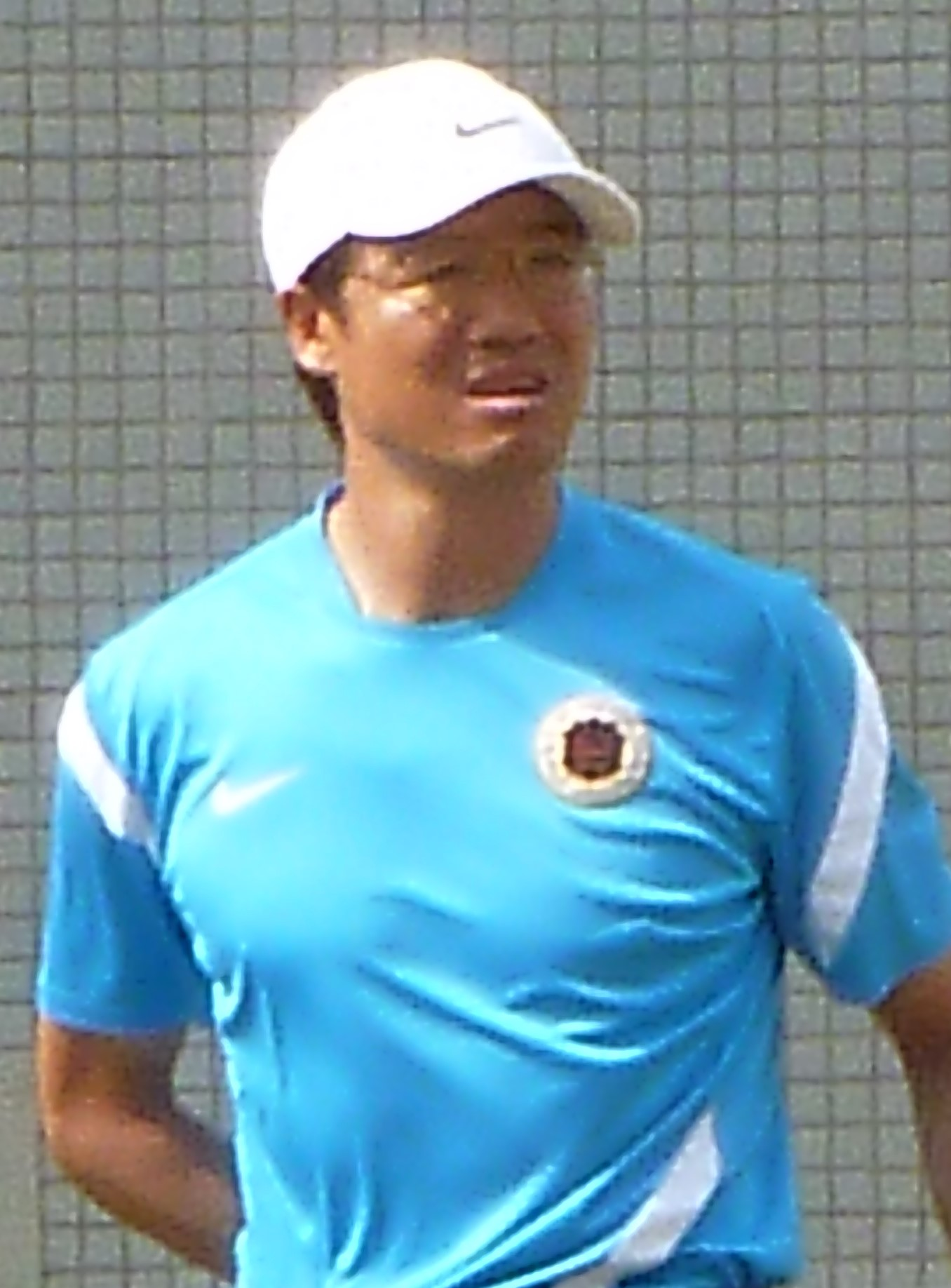
- Kim managing Hong Kong in 2012

Personal information
- Full name: Kim Pan-gon
- Date of birth: 1 May 1969 (age 57)
- Place of birth: Jinju, South Korea
- Height: 1.83 m (6 ft 0 in)
- Position: Winger

Team information
- Current team: Selangor (head coach)

College career
Years	Team	Apps	(Gls)
- Honam University

Senior career*
Years	Team	Apps	(Gls)
1992–1996	Ulsan Hyundai Horang-i	58	(5)
1997	Jeonbuk Hyundai Dinos	2	(0)
2000–2002	Double Flower	67	(19)
2002–2004	Buler Rangers	21	(3)
Total		148	(27)

Managerial career
- 2002–2004: Buler Rangers
- 2005–2008: Busan IPark (assistant)
- 2008–2010: South China
- 2009: Hong Kong U23
- 2009–2010: Hong Kong
- 2011: Gyeongnam FC (assistant)
- 2012–2013: Hong Kong U23
- 2012–2017: Hong Kong
- 2022–2024: Malaysia
- 2024–2025: Ulsan HD
- 2026–: Selangor
Medal record
Men's football
Representing Hong Kong (as manager)
East Asian Games
Gold medal – first place	2009 Hong Kong
- * Club domestic league appearances and goals

Kim Pan-gon (Korean: 김판곤; Hanja: 金判坤, born 1 May 1969) is a South Korean football manager and former player who played as a winger. He is currently the head coach of the Malaysia Super League club, Selangor.

== Early life ==
Kim was born into a family of peasants in Jinju, a small town in South Gyeongsang Province, South Korea. He was the youngest of five children and his family used to set up stalls to sell food 5 kilometers outside of Jinju every Friday. Kim loved football, but the junior high school he attended did not have a team of its own. In order to play football in high school, he enrolled in Changshin High School in Masan, at an hour's drive from his hometown, and Honam University, a famous non-traditional football school.

== Club career ==
While in university, Kim attracted the attention of Ulsan Hyundai Horang-i manager Cha Bum-kun and turned pro with Ulsan Hyundai in 1992. Kim failed to impress, however, and had to undergo seven surgeries due to a shin injury in his third year. He transferred to another K League club Jeonbuk Hyundai Dinos in 1997, but could not overcome the effects of his injury and retired that year.

Kim became a high school coach for a while but left for Hong Kong to make a comeback. In 2000, he joined Instant-Dict (renamed Double Flower the next year) in the Hong Kong First Division League. He contributed to a Hong Kong FA Cup title and later moved to Buler Rangers in 2002 to serve as a player-coach for two years.

== Managerial career ==
=== Busan IPark ===
Kim returned to South Korea in 2004 and obtained the AFC Professional Football Coaching Diploma, Asia's highest-level coaching license. At that time, only five other South Koreans held the same qualification. In 2005, he became Busan IPark's assistant coach under manager Ian Porterfield.

During four years at Busan, Kim helped his team as caretaker manager whenever they had urgent situations. He won Busan's first victory of the 2006 season in his second match as Busan's manager on 8 April 2006 after predecessor Porterfield failed to get a victory in 21 consecutive matches, and achieved four consecutive victories in that month. This sudden change was called the "Pan-gon's Magic" by Korean media. He returned as the assistant coach when André Egli became a replacement for Porterfield in July. However, Egli abruptly announced his resignation while attending field training in the United States in June 2007, and Kim once again managed Busan as caretaker manager for the remainder of the season. Busan quickly recruited Park Sung-hwa as their new manager in July, but Park left for the South Korean Olympic team after just 17 days.

=== South China and Hong Kong ===
Kim became the manager of Hong Kong First Division League club South China on 3 December 2008. Under Kim, South China won the 2009 Lunar New Year Cup after defeating league all-star team and Sparta Prague. After contributing to South China's league title in the 2008–09 season, he started to manage Hong Kong national teams at the same time. Kim and South China also won 2–0 over Tottenham Hotspur in a pre-season friendly, and advanced to the semi-finals in the 2009 AFC Cup. He finished his best year by leading Hong Kong national under-23 team to an East Asian Games title.

On 11 December 2010, after a 3–4 defeat to Kitchee, Kim Pan-gon resigned from the post of South China team manager, citing health reasons that required him to recuperate back in South Korea.

=== Gyeongnam FC ===
On 26 November 2010, Kim was transferred position from manager to physical fitness consultant of South China, and he will return to South Korea later to serve as a tactical consultant for K League side Gyeongnam FC. Kim told the media that due to minor heart and liver problems, it is not suitable for him to be the manager of South China. It is convenient to stay in South Korea for medical treatment. Earlier, he was invited by Gyeongnam to be the manager, but Kim only agreed to serve as a tactical consultant, and his family would continue to stay in Hong Kong. However, due to the health of his wife living in Hong Kong, he returned to Hong Kong after one season.

=== Return to Hong Kong ===
Kim suddenly appeared in Hong Kong on 5 October 2011, claiming to the media that his health has recovered and he has applied last week to the Hong Kong Football Association (HKFA) to be the new Hong Kong national team coach. He also confirmed that his contract with Gyeongnam FC still has one year to run, but he will be released if he is appointed by the HKFA.

Kim was appointed as National Academy coach by the HKFA on 22 December 2011. He was wholly responsible for the identification, development and coaching of all players aged 18 and below. He took up the position of acting manager of Hong Kong national football team in November 2012 following the resignation of former manager Ernie Merrick. Afterwards, the HKFA confirmed Kim as the permanent manager of the Hong Kong national football team on 28 May 2013. He signed a two-and-a-half-year contract with the HKFA.

According to Kim, most of the Hong Kongese players do not have an environment where they can comfortably focus on football, where most of the players are semi-professionals. Kim took this into consideration and used the short time as efficiently as possible. The focus was on physical strength and organization. Hong Kong players worked together through strengthening training for about two to three days a week. Kim led the Hong Kong under-23 team to the knockout stage of the 2014 Asian Games after earning 7 points in the group stage, but they were eliminated by eventual champions South Korea in the round of 16. In December 2015, HKFA announced that they will renew Kim's contract until June 2018. During the 2018 FIFA World Cup qualifiers, Hong Kong's two 0–0 draws with China not only attracted new fans to support the Hong Kong team but also increased Kim's popularity.

However, Kim was gradually criticised by failing to qualify for the 2019 AFC Asian Cup and recruiting too many foreign players. During the match against North Korea, some fans held up the "Kim Out" slogan and asked Kim to resign due to bad performances in the Asian Cup qualification. "Kim Out" slogans flooded social media as well, criticising Kim's conservative tactics and failure to play offensive football, making it difficult for Hong Kong to easily win. Hong Kong fans also criticised that after Kim took the office, the number of naturalised players in the team increased greatly, making it difficult for local youth to find opportunities to fight for places in the starting lineup. Some naturalised players of the team were fairly old, such as centre-back Festus Baise from Nigeria and midfielder Itaparica from Brazil, who were both well over 37 years old at the time. Kim replied to the fans regarding the influx of naturalised player on an interview in December 2019, saying "Hong Kong is an international city, everyone wants to be a Hong Konger and everyone wants to fight for the citizens of Hong Kong. Why aren't they [naturalised players] welcomed?".

In December 2017, Kim resigned as Hong Kong coach to become technical director of the Korean Football Association.

=== Korea Football Association ===
On 26 December 2017, Kim was appointed Korea Football Association (KFA)'s vice president and head of the reinforcement committee. His long-term plan was to change the future of the nation's football like when he managed the Hong Kong national team. He put emphasis on sports science and made football science team in the KFA to approach to players' treatment, recovery and weight training scientifically. After setting as the direction "proactive football", he hired Paulo Bento as national team manager and explained his hiring process to the media.

=== Malaysia ===
On 21 January 2022, the Football Association of Malaysia (FAM) named Kim the new national team coach. He resigned as technical director of the Korean Football Association and flew to Malaysia in mid-February that year with four staff: analysis and fitness officers, assistant coaches and technical trainers. Kim signed a two-year contract expiring in 2024 that would be extended if FAM was satisfied with the performance of the national squad.

In June 2022 on the third round of 2023 AFC Asian Cup qualification, Malaysia faced 3 matches which began with a 3–1 victory against Turkmenistan in the first match, suffering a 1–2 loss to Bahrain, before successfully ending their campaign by defeating Bangladesh with 4–1. Thus, Malaysia finished second in Group E behind Bahrain and automatically qualified for the 2023 AFC Asian Cup on merit after 42 years.

Before the opening of the 2022 AFF Championship, Kim selected 41 players for the preliminary squad for the competition, but Tunku Ismail Idris, the crown prince of Johor and the owner of Malaysian champions Johor Darul Ta'zim, refused to release his key players. The competition was not an essential tournament approved by FIFA, and clubs were not required to send players. So Kim called up new players including naturalised Malaysians, and focused on seeing if they were worthy of being on the team. His team advanced to the semifinals as group runner-up after winning three games in Group B, where it competed with Vietnam, Myanmar, Singapore and Laos. Malaysia advanced to the semifinals and won the first leg, 1–0, over the defending champion Thailand, but fell in the second, 3–0.

Malaysia went to the 2023 AFC Asian Cup with high expectations, as they were put in a group with Jordan, Bahrain, and South Korea. As part of the preparation for the tournament, Malaysia had a friendly match with Syria with a 2–2 draw.

Malaysia opened their tournament with a disastrous start, as they were beaten 0–4 by Jordan. In the second match against Bahrain, whom they met in the qualifiers, also beaten by a last-minute goal for Bahrain. Thus, Malaysia failed to advance past the group stages of the AFC Asian Cup again after four appearances, while they were also struggling to find their first Asian Cup win since their last win in 1980. Kim was heavily criticized for using an unusual tactic than he frequently uses and for calling up Natxo Insa, who was 37 years old, had only made one cap for the national team, and had last played in 2018. Heading to the last match against Kim native country, South Korea, Malaysia shockingly held South Korea to a 3–3 draw, thus earning Malaysia's first point in the Asian Cup since 1980.

In the second round of the 2026 FIFA World Cup qualification, Malaysia led the group with 6 points after defeating Kyrgyzstan and Chinese Taipei. Heading into the match against Oman in March, the Malaysian team remained optimistic in getting some positive results. However, Malaysia suffered 2–0 defeats, both away and at home. Malaysia then only managed to get 1 point against Kyrgyzstan and 3 points against Chinese Taipei, and eventually only finished in third place with 10 points, thus Kim was unable to lead Malaysia to the third round of the World Cup qualifiers.

On 16 July 2024, Kim announced that he has resigned as Malaysia's national team head coach, citing personal commitments.

=== Ulsan HD ===
On 28 July 2024, Kim signed with K League 1 club Ulsan HD, becoming a successor to Hong Myung-bo, who was appointed the manager of the South Korea national team. On 1 November, he led Ulsan to its third K League 1 title in a row after overcoming doubts about taking on the position midway through the season. Kim's side defeated nearest challengers Gangwon FC 2–1 that day to secure the club's league title. On the contrary, he lost six out of seven matches in the league stage of the 2024–25 AFC Champions League Elite, remaining a concern at the international level. The concern was realised at the 2025 FIFA Club World Cup, where he lost all three matches. He changed a back four with which Ulsan had been familiar to a back three to counterattack stronger teams at the Club World Cup, but the choice was followed by a failure as a result. Around the same time, he had three draws and four losses without a win in seven K League 1 matches, losing his competitiveness even in South Korea. On 2 August 2025, he left Ulsan after a 3–2 loss to Suwon FC.

=== Selangor ===
On 5 January 2026, Malaysia Super League club Selangor announced they had appointed Kim as new head coach and that he would begin his tenure at the club that day.

== Personal life ==
Kim obtained Hong Kong permanent residency after living there for seven years. His wife, son and daughter all live in Hong Kong.

== Managerial statistics ==
As of match played 8 November 2026

Managerial record by team and tenure
Team	From	To	Record					Ref.
Team	From	To	Pld	W	D	L	Win %	Ref.
Buler Rangers	1 July 2002	1 July 2004	49	24	7	18	48.98	
Busan IPark (caretaker)	4 April 2006	29 July 2006	22	9	3	10	40.91	
Busan IPark (caretaker)	7 August 2007	3 December 2007	14	2	5	7	14.29	
South China	3 December 2008	11 December 2010	70	48	10	12	68.57	
Hong Kong (Note: Does not include match(es) against Guangdong at the Guangdong–Hong Kong Cup.)	1 August 2009	4 March 2010	8	2	2	4	25.00	
Hong Kong U23	1 August 2009	4 March 2010	4	1	2	1	25.00	
Hong Kong	2 November 2012	25 December 2017	53	21	13	19	39.62	
Hong Kong U23	15 September 2014	25 December 2017	10	3	3	4	30.00	
Malaysia	21 January 2022	16 July 2024	35	19	7	9	54.29	
Ulsan HD	28 July 2024	2 August 2025	52	20	11	21	38.46	
Selangor	5 January 2026	Present	35	24	6	5	68.57	
Total			352	173	69	110	49.15	

== Honours ==
=== Player ===
Ulsan Hyundai Horang-i

- K League 1: 1996
- Korean League Cup: 1995

Instant-Dict

- Hong Kong FA Cup: 2000–01

Buler Rangers

- Hong Kong FA Cup runner-up: 2002–03

Individual

- Hong Kong FA Top Footballers: 2002–03

=== Manager ===
South China

- Hong Kong First Division League: 2008–09, 2009–10
- Hong Kong Senior Challenge Shield: 2009–10

Hong Kong U23

- East Asian Games: 2009

Ulsan HD

- K League 1: 2024
- Korea Cup runner-up: 2024

Individual

- Hong Kong FA Coach of the Year: 2010
- K League All-Star: 2025
