= 2002–03 Hong Kong FA Cup =

Tournament details
- Country: Hong Kong

Final positions
- Champions: Sun Hei (1st title)
- Runners-up: Buler Rangers

2002–03 Hong Kong FA Cup was the 29th staging of the Hong Kong FA Cup.

The competition started on 6 April 2003 with 8 Hong Kong First Division clubs. The cup competition was a single-elimination tournament. All matches were held at the Mongkok Stadium

== Teams ==
- Buler Rangers
- Double Flower
- Fukien
- Happy Valley
- HKFC
- South China
- Sun Hei
- Xiangxue Pharmaceutical

== Fixtures and results ==
All times are Hong Kong Time (UTC+8).

=== Bracket ===
Quarter-finals
Sun Hei	4
HKFC	1
Double Flower	3
Happy Valley	2
South China	6
Fukien	1
Buler Rangers	2
Xiangxue Pharmaceutical	0

Semi-finals
Sun Hei	1
Double Flower	0
South China	0
Buler Rangers	1

Final
Sun Hei (a.e.t.)	1 (2)
Buler Rangers	1 (1)

=== Quarter-finals ===
6 April 2003
13:30

Sun Hei	4 – 1	HKFC
Walmor 19'; Lau Chi Keung 45' ?'; Márcio ?'	(Report)	Anto Grabo 20'

Mong Kok Stadium

6 April 2003
15:30

Double Flower	3 – 2	Happy Valley
Paymond Nono 78'; Ng Wai Kwan 87'; Cheng Siu Wai 90'	(Report)	Ogbe Eki 8' (o.g.); Leung Tak Chun 77' (o.g.)

Mong Kok Stadium

8 April 2003
18:00

South China	6 – 1	Fukien
Au Wai Lun ?'; Kim Dae-Chul ?' 84'; Emerson Leite 54' (o.g.); Chan Chi Hong 68'; Chan Ho Man 80'	(Report)	Charles Benin 73'

Mong Kok Stadium

9 April 2003
14:00

Buler Rangers	2 – 0	Xiangxue Pharmaceutical
Chan Yiu Lun 54'; Julius Akosah 65'	(Report)

Mong Kok Stadium

=== Semi-finals ===
15 April 2003
18:00

Sun Hei	1 – 0	Double Flower
Márcio 75' (pen.)	(Report)

Mong Kok Stadium
Attendance: 1,496

15 April 2003
20:00

South China	0 – 1	Buler Rangers
	(Report)	Anilton 86'

Mong Kok Stadium
Attendance: 1,496

=== Final ===
18 April 2003
15:00

Sun Hei	2 – 1 (a.e.t.)	Buler Rangers
Cornelius 45' 101'	(Report)	Lo Kwan Yee 28'

Mong Kok Stadium
Attendance: 1,522

== Goalscorers ==
Rank	Scorer	Team	Goals
1	(South Korea) Kim Dae-Chul	South China	2
=	(Nigeria) Cornelius Udebuluzor	Sun Hei	2
=	(Hong Kong) Lau Chi Keung	Sun Hei	2
=	(Brazil) Márcio	Sun Hei	2
5	(Hong Kong) Chan Yiu Lun	Buler Rangers	1
=	(Cameroon) Julius Akosah	Buler Rangers	1
=	(Hong Kong) Lo Kwan Yee	Buler Rangers	1
=	(Brazil) Anilton	Buler Rangers	1
=	(Cameroon) Paymond Nono	Double Flower	1
=	(Hong Kong) Ng Wai Kwan	Double Flower	1
=	(Hong Kong) Cheng Siu Wai	Double Flower	1
=	(Ghana) Charles Benin	Fukien	1
=	(Hong Kong) Anto Grabo	HKFC	1
=	(Hong Kong) Au Wai Lun	South China	1
=	(Hong Kong) Chan Chi Hong	South China	1
=	(Hong Kong) Chan Ho Man	South China	1
=	(Brazil) Walmor	Sun Hei	1

== Prizes ==
- Champion (HK$50,000): Sun Hei
- 1st Runners-up (HK$10,000): Buler Rangers
