= 1999–2000 Hong Kong FA Cup =

Tournament details
- Country: Hong Kong

Final positions
- Champions: Happy Valley (1st title)
- Runners-up: Orient & Yee Hope Union

1999–2000 Hong Kong FA Cup was the 26th staging of the Hong Kong FA Cup.

It was competed by all of the 8 teams from Hong Kong First Division League. The competition kicked off on 30 March 2000 and finished on 9 April with the final.

Happy Valley won the cup for the first time after beating Orient & Yee Hope Union by 7-2 in the final, the highest scoring final in the cup history.

== Fixtures and results ==
=== Bracket ===
Quarter-finals
Happy Valley	4
Rangers	1
Instant-Dict	3
Kitchee	0
Sai Kung Friends (AET)	2 (2)
South China	2 (3)
Orient & Yee Hope Union	2
Sun Hei	0

Semi-finals
Happy Valley	4
Instant-Dict	2
South China (AET)	2 (2)
Orient & Yee Hope Union	2 (3)

Final
Happy Valley	7
Orient & Yee Hope Union	2
