= 1990–91 Hong Kong Senior Shield =

Tournament details
- Country: Hong Kong
- Teams: 10

Final positions
- Champions: South China (22nd title)
- Runners-up: Lai Sun

Tournament statistics
- Matches played: 9
- Goals scored: 31 (3.44 per match)

1990–91 Hong Kong Challenge Shield (Chinese: 駱駝漆銀牌賽) was the 89th edition of Hong Kong Senior Shield.

== Results ==
All times are Hong Kong Time (UTC+8).

=== Bracket ===
First round
HKFC	1
Martini	3
Eastern	3
Ernest Borel	1

Quarter-finals
Martini	1
Sing Tao	0
South China	4
Kui Tan	0
Happy Valley	4
Double Flower	2
Lai Sun	2
Eastern	1

Semi-finals
Martini	1
South China	2
Happy Valley	0
Lai Sun	5

Final
South China	1
Lai Sun	0

== Final ==
1990-12-30
15:00

South China	1–0	Lai Sun
Greer 56'

Government Stadium
Attendance: 21,915

SOUTH CHINA:
GK	(Hong Kong) Yam Wai Hung
RB	(Hong Kong) Pang Kam Chuen
CB	(Hong Kong) Chan Ping On
CB	(Hong Kong) Ku Kam Fai
LB	(Hong Kong) Chan Wai Chiu
RM	(Hong Kong) Loh Wai Chi
CM	(Hong Kong) Leslie Santos
CM	(Hong Kong) Au Yeung Ying Tsz
LM	(Hong Kong) Chu Yue Tai
CF	(Australia) Ross Greer
CF	(England) Dale Tempest
Coach:
(Hong Kong) Wong Man Wai

LAI SUN:
GK	(Hong Kong) Liu Chun Fai
RB	(Hong Kong) Cheung Chi Tak
CB	(Hong Kong) Lai Law Kau
CB	(Hong Kong) Wong Kwok On
LB	(Hong Kong) Chan Chi Keung
RM	(Hong Kong) Lee Kin Wo
CM	(Hong Kong) Chiu Chun Ming
CM	(Hong Kong) Tim Bredbury
LM	(Hong Kong) Lui Tat Wah
CF	(England) Peter Bodak
CF	(Australia) Paul Wormley
Coach:
(Hong Kong) Li Ping Hung

MATCH RULES

- 90 minutes.
- 30 minutes of extra-time if necessary.
- Replay if scores still level.
