= 1989–90 Hong Kong First Division League =

Hong Kong First Division
- Season: 1989–90
- Champions: South China
- Relegated: Police
- Matches played: 72
- Goals scored: 178 (2.47 per match)

The 1989–90 Hong Kong First Division League season was the 79th since its establishment. Each team was allowed to sign 2 foreign players.

== League table ==
Pos	Team	Pld	W	D	L	GF	GA	GD	Pts
1	South China (C)	16	14	1	1	38	8	+30	43
2	Lai Sun	16	9	4	3	24	16	+8	31
3	Happy Valley	16	6	8	2	23	13	+10	26
4	Double Flower	16	5	6	5	19	16	+3	21
5	Eastern	16	5	3	8	20	20	0	18
6	Sea Bee	16	5	3	8	17	28	−11	18
7	Sing Tao	16	4	5	7	14	22	−8	17
8	HKFC	16	2	6	8	14	27	−13	12
9	Police (R)	16	2	4	10	9	28	−19	10

Source: rsssf.com
(C) Champions; (R) Relegated
