= Anto Grabo =

Footballer (born 1960)

Personal information
- Date of birth: 7 December 1960 (age 65)
- Place of birth: Travnik, SFR Yugoslavia (now Bosnia and Herzegovina)
- Position: Striker

Team information
- Current team: HKFC (technical coach)

Senior career*
Years	Team	Apps	(Gls)
1979–1984	Željezničar Sarajevo	69	(14)
1984–1985	Dinamo Vinkovci	18	(2)
1985–1986	Rudar Ljubija	32	(9)
1986–1988	Novi Sad	57	(13)
1988–1989	Željezničar Sarajevo	4	(0)
1989–1990	Lommel	18	(2)
1990–1992	Kuala Lumpur		
1992–1995	South China		
1995–1997	Golden		
1997–1999	Sing Tao		
1999–2001	Instant-Dict		
2001–2006	HKFC		
2007–2008	HKFC		

International career
1993–1994	Hong Kong	3	(0)

Managerial career
- 2010: South China (assistant)
- 2010–2015: HKFC (assistant)
- 2015–2016: Pegasus (assistant)
- 2016–2017: HKFC (assistant)
- 2022–2024: HKFC (assistant)
- 2024–: HKFC (technical coach)
- * Club domestic league appearances and goals

Anto Grabo (Chinese: 基保, born 7 December 1960) is a former professional footballer who played as a striker and is currently the technical coach of Hong Kong Premier League club HKFC.

He played with Željezničar Sarajevo, Dinamo Vinkovci, Rudar Ljubija and RFK Novi Sad in Yugoslavia, as well as Lommel in Belgium and Kuala Lumpur FA in Malaysia before settling in Hong Kong.

== International career ==
Born in what is now Bosnia and Herzegovina, he represented Hong Kong at international level in which he became one of the oldest players fielded at the age of 40 during a friendly international fixture against Estonia back in 2000.
