= 2000–01 Hong Kong First Division League =

Hong Kong First Division
- Season: 2000–01
- Champions: Happy Valley
- Relegated: Po Chai Pills; Kitchee
- Matches: 56
- Goals: 192 (3.43 per match)
- Top goalscorer: Paul Ritchie (Happy Valley)

The 2000–01 Hong Kong First Division League season was the 90th since its establishment. The season began on 2 August 2000 and ended on 2 June 2001.

== First stage ==
| Pos | Team | Pld | W | D | L | GF | GA | GD | Pts | Qualification or relegation |
|---|---|---|---|---|---|---|---|---|---|---|
| 1 | Happy Valley | 14 | 9 | 4 | 1 | 49 | 15 | +34 | 31 | To Grand Final |
| 2 | Instant-Dict | 14 | 8 | 4 | 2 | 38 | 16 | +22 | 28 | Championship Playoff |
| 3 | South China | 14 | 8 | 4 | 2 | 27 | 20 | +7 | 28 | Championship Playoff |
| 4 | Sun Hei | 14 | 7 | 5 | 2 | 26 | 15 | +11 | 26 | Championship Playoff |
| 5 | O&YH Union | 14 | 6 | 4 | 4 | 27 | 22 | +5 | 22 | Relegation Playoff |
| 6 | Rangers | 14 | 2 | 3 | 9 | 9 | 28 | −19 | 9 | Relegation Playoff |
| 7 | Kitchee | 14 | 1 | 2 | 11 | 7 | 40 | −33 | 5 | Relegation Playoff |
| 8 | Po Chai Pills | 14 | 0 | 4 | 10 | 9 | 36 | −27 | 4 | Relegation Playoff |

== Second stage ==
NB: Teams take points and goals halved from first phase. GF and GA is rounded.

=== Championship playoff ===
| Pos | Team | Pld | W | D | L | GF | GA | GD | BP | Pts | Qualification |
|---|---|---|---|---|---|---|---|---|---|---|---|
| 1 | Instant-Dict | 6 | 5 | 1 | 0 | 30 | 11 | +19 | 14 | 30 | To Grand Final |
| 2 | Happy Valley | 6 | 2 | 1 | 3 | 29 | 16 | +13 | 15.5 | 22.5 | |
| 3 | South China | 6 | 2 | 1 | 3 | 21 | 17 | +4 | 14 | 21 | |
| 4 | Sun Hei | 6 | 1 | 1 | 4 | 21 | 20 | +1 | 13 | 17 | |

=== Relegation playoff ===
| Pos | Team | Pld | W | D | L | GF | GA | GD | BP | Pts | Relegation |
|---|---|---|---|---|---|---|---|---|---|---|---|
| 5 | O&YH Union | 6 | 6 | 0 | 0 | 35 | 17 | +18 | 11 | 29 | Withdrawn from league system |
| 6 | Rangers | 6 | 2 | 2 | 2 | 13 | 20 | −7 | 4.5 | 12.5 | |
| 7 | Po Chai Pills | 6 | 1 | 2 | 3 | 10 | 32 | −22 | 2 | 7 | Dissolved |
| 8 | Kitchee | 6 | 0 | 2 | 4 | 6 | 30 | −24 | 2.5 | 4.5 | Relegation to Second Division |

== Final ==
2 June 2001

| Happy Valley | 1–0 | Instant-Dict |
|---|---|---|
| Cheung Sai Ho 59' |

Hong Kong Stadium

First Division League 2000–01 winners

4th title
