= 1997–98 Hong Kong FA Cup =

Tournament details
- Country: Hong Kong

Final positions
- Champions: Instant-Dict (3rd title)
- Runners-up: South China

1997–98 Hong Kong FA Cup was the 24th staging of the Hong Kong FA Cup. It was competed by all of the 8 teams from Hong Kong First Division League. The competition kicked off on 4 May 1998 and finished on 10 May with the final.

Instant-Double captured the cup for the consecutive second time after beating South China by 3–1 in the final.

== Fixtures and results ==
=== Bracket ===
Quarter-finals
Instant-Dict	5
Five-One-Seven	0
Yee Hope	2
Rangers	1
Sing Tao	4
Happy Valley	1
South China	5
Golden	1

Semi-finals
Instant-Dict	2
Yee Hope	1
Sing Tao	0
South China	2

Final
Instant-Dict	3
South China	1

=== Final ===
10 May 1998

Instant-Dict	3 – 1	South China
科士打 3' (pen.) 66'; O'Shea 18'	(Report) (in Chinese)	Lee Kin Wo 10'

Hong Kong Stadium
