= 1993–94 Hong Kong First Division League =

Hong Kong First Division
- Season: 1993–94
- Champions: Eastern
- Relegated: Rangers; HKFC
- Matches played: 90
- Goals scored: 241 (2.68 per match)

The 1993–94 Hong Kong First Division League season was the 83rd since its establishment.

== League table ==
Pos	Team	Pld	W	D	L	GF	GA	GD	Pts
1	Eastern (C)	18	13	3	2	42	17	+25	42
2	Instant Dict	18	12	3	3	37	14	+23	39
3	South China	18	8	6	4	30	17	+13	30
4	Sing Tao	18	8	3	7	27	19	+8	27
5	Kitchee	18	7	4	7	23	20	+3	25
6	Happy Valley	18	6	6	6	23	22	+1	24
7	Kui Tan	18	4	8	6	17	20	−3	20
8	Voicelink	18	4	5	9	19	24	−5	17
9	Rangers (R)	18	3	7	8	11	28	−17	16
10	HKFC (R)	18	1	3	14	12	60	−48	6

Source: rsssf.com
(C) Champions; (R) Relegated
