= 1996–97 Hong Kong FA Cup =

Tournament details
- Country: Hong Kong

Final positions
- Champions: Instant-Double (2nd title)
- Runners-up: Sing Tao

1996–97 Hong Kong FA Cup was the 23rd staging of the Hong Kong FA Cup. It was competed by all of the 7 teams from Hong Kong First Division League and Yee Hope from the Second Division. The competition kicked off on 6 May 1997 and finished on 1 June with the final.

Instant-Double captured the cup for the first time after beating Sing Tao by golden goal in the final.

== Fixtures and results ==
=== Bracket ===
Quarter-finals
Instant-Dict	4
Yee Hope	2
Eastern (PSO)	1 (5)
Golden	1 (4)
Sing Tao (AET)	0 (1)
South China	0 (0)
Uhlsport Rangers	3
Happy Valley	1

Semi-finals
Instant-Dict	6
Eastern	0
Sing Tao	3
Uhlsport Rangers	1

Final
Instant-Dict (AET)	1 (2)
Sing Tao	1 (1)
