= 1984–85 Hong Kong FA Cup =

Tournament details
- Country: Hong Kong

Final positions
- Champions: South China (1st title)
- Runners-up: Harps

1984–85 Hong Kong FA Cup was the 11th staging of the Hong Kong FA Cup. It was competed by all of the 9 teams from Hong Kong First Division League.

South China won the cup for the first time after beating Harps in the final by 3–1 in the reply match.

== Fixtures and results ==
=== Bracket ===
First Round
Happy Valley	2
Rangers	0

Quarter-finals
Sea Bee	1
Happy Valley	3
South China	2
Tung Sing	0
Harps (PSO)	0 (11)
Eastern	0 (10)
Seiko	3
Tsuen Wan	1

Semi-finals
Happy Valley	0
South China	2
Harps	1
Seiko	0

Final
South China (Replay)	2 (3)
Harps	2 (1)
