= Željko Gavrilović =

Serbian footballer

Personal information
- Full name: Željko Gavrilović
- Date of birth: 6 December 1971 (age 54)
- Place of birth: Titovo Užice, SR Serbia, SFR Yugoslavia
- Height: 1.85 m (6 ft 1 in)
- Position: Forward

Senior career*
Years	Team	Apps	(Gls)
1993–1994	Obilić		
1994–1995	Nacional	16	(1)
1995–1997	Camacha	66	(34)
1997–1999	Sing Tao		
1999–2000	South China		
2001	Paniliakos	10	(0)
2002–2003	Békéscsaba	19	(2)
2005	Þór Akureyri	6	(3)
2006–2007	Radnik Bijeljina	32	(2)
2007	Modriča	4	(0)
2008–2009	Radnik Bijeljina		
- * Club domestic league appearances and goals

Željko Gavrilović (Serbian Cyrillic: Жељко Гавриловић; born 6 December 1971) is a Serbian former professional footballer who played as a forward.

== Career ==
Gavrilović played professionally in Portugal (Nacional and Camacha), Hong Kong (Sing Tao and South China), Greece (Paniliakos), Hungary (Békéscsaba), Iceland (Þór Akureyri), and Bosnia and Herzegovina (Radnik Bijeljina and Modriča).
