= 1990–91 Hong Kong First Division League =

Hong Kong First Division
- Season: 1990–91
- Champions: South China
- Matches played: 90
- Goals scored: 226 (2.51 per match)

The 1990–91 Hong Kong First Division League season was the 80th since its establishment.

== League table ==
Pos	Team	Pld	W	D	L	GF	GA	GD	Pts
1	South China (C)	18	12	5	1	38	10	+28	41
2	Happy Valley	18	8	9	1	30	13	+17	33
3	Lai Sun (W)	18	8	6	4	34	18	+16	30
4	Ernest Borel	18	8	5	5	29	21	+8	29
5	Double Flower	18	5	8	5	20	20	0	23
6	Kui Tan	18	5	7	6	20	24	−4	22
7	Eastern	18	4	8	6	21	22	−1	20
8	HKFC	18	6	2	10	14	34	−20	20
9	Sing Tao (N)	18	3	5	10	13	35	−22	14
10	Martini (R)	18	1	5	12	7	29	−22	8

Source: rsssf.com
(C) Champions; (N) Relegation to Second Division by rules, but retained in the First Division.; (R) Relegated; (W) Withdrew from the league system after the season.
