= 1995–96 Hong Kong FA Cup =

Tournament details
- Country: Hong Kong

Final positions
- Champions: South China (6th title)
- Runners-up: Golden

1995–96 Hong Kong FA Cup was the 22nd staging of the Hong Kong FA Cup. It was competed by all of the 10 teams from Hong Kong First Division League. The competition kicked off on 17 March 1996 and finished on 21 April with the final.

South China captured the cup for the sixth time after beating Golden by 4–1 in the final.

== Fixtures and results ==
=== Bracket ===
First Round
Sing Tao	6
Eastern	1
Happy Valley	2
Mansion	1

Quarter-finals
South China	3
Sing Tao	0
Uhlsport Rangers (PSO)	1 (4)
Frankwell	1 (3)
Golden	5
HKFC	0
Happy Valley	0 (0)
Instant-Dict (AET)	0 (1)

Semi-finals
South China	5
Uhlsport Rangers	2
Golden	3
Instant-Dict	2

Final
South China	4
Golden	1

=== Final ===
21 April 1996

South China	4 – 1	Golden
Chan Chi Hong ?' ?' ?'; Cheng Siu Chung ?'		Fairweather 90'
