= Cornelius Udebuluzor =

Nigerian footballer (born 1974)

Personal information
- Full name: Cornelius Chi-Dubem Udebuluzor
- Date of birth: 27 August 1974 (age 52)
- Place of birth: Port Harcourt, Nigeria
- Height: 1.81 m (5 ft 11 in)
- Position: Striker

Senior career*
Years	Team	Apps	(Gls)
1996	Jasper United		
1996–1997	Górnik Zabrze	17	(4)
1997–2000	Ionikos	20	(4)
2000	Proodeftiki	2	(0)
2000–2001	Sun Hei		(12)
2001–2002	Hong Kong Rangers		(12)
2002–2003	Sun Hei		(16)
2003–2004	Hong Kong Rangers		
2004–2005	Sun Hei		(5)
2005–2007	Hong Kong Rangers		
- * Club domestic league appearances and goals

Cornelius Chi-Dubem Udebuluzor (Chinese: 哥連斯; born 27 August 1974) is a Nigerian former professional footballer who played as a striker for Nigerian club Jasper United, Polish club Górnik Zabrze, Greek clubs Ionikos and Proodeftiki, and Hong Kong clubs Sun Hei and Hong Kong Rangers.

== Club career ==
Udebuluzor started his career at Jasper United, before joining Polish club Górnik Zabrze in 1996. He represented Hong Kong League XI in various friendly matches, including the Lunar New Year Cup. In 2001, he helped Hong Kong XI beating Paraguay at the Lunar New Year Cup. The following year, he again represented Hong Kong XI in the Lunar New Year Cup and then a pre-World Cup 2002 tournament held in Hong Kong against Scotland. In 2002–2003, he also won Hong Kong FA Cup with Sun Hei, as well as the League Cup final. In the league they finished runners-up, one point behind the champions. Was the second best league scorer with 16 goals in 2002–2003.

== Personal life ==
Udebuluzor's son Michael (born 1 April 2004) is a footballer and has represented Hong Kong at international level.

== Honours ==
Sun Hei

- Hong Kong First Division League: 2004–05
- Hong Kong FA Cup: 2002–03, 2004–05
- Hong Kong League Cup: 2002–03, 2004–05

Individual

- Hong Kong First Division League top scorer: 2001–02

Preceded by Paul Ritchie	Hong Kong First Division League top scorer 2001–02	Succeeded by Keith Gumbs
