= 2001–02 Hong Kong League Cup =

Hong Kong League Cup 2001–02 is the 2nd staging of the Hong Kong League Cup.

== Fixtures ==
=== First round ===
15 November 2001

Happy Valley	2-1 (golden goal)	HKFC

15 November 2001

Sun Hei	2-1 (golden goal)	Double Flower

17 November 2001

Buler Rangers	3-1	Xiangxue Pharmaceutical

=== Group stage ===
Team	Pts	Pld	W	D	L	GF	GA	GD
South China	7	3	2	1	0	5	2	3
Buler Rangers	4	3	1	1	1	5	4	1
Happy Valley	4	3	1	1	1	6	6	0
Sun Hei	1	3	0	1	2	4	8	-4

6 December 2001

Happy Valley	3-2	Buler Rangers

6 December 2001

South China	3-1	Sun Hei

9 December 2001

Happy Valley	1-2	South China

9 December 2001

Sun Hei	1-3	Buler Rangers

15 December 2001

Buler Rangers	0-0	South China

15 December 2001

Sun Hei	2-2	Happy Valley

=== Final ===
2002-01-13
15:30

South China	3 – 0	Buler Rangers
Cordeiro 23'; Zinho 45'; Au Wai Lun 70'

Hong Kong Stadium
Attendance: 3,282

Hong Kong League Cup 2001–02 Winner
South China
First Title
