= 2026–27 Hong Kong FA Cup =

Tournament details
- Country: Hong Kong
- Dates: 23 January 2027 – 15 May 2027
- Teams: 11

The 2026–27 Hong Kong FA Cup is the 52nd edition of the Hong Kong FA Cup. 11 teams entered this edition. The competition is only open to clubs who participate in the 2026–27 Hong Kong Premier League, with lower division sides entering the Junior Division, a separate competition. The winners of this year's FA Cup qualified for the 2027–28 AFC Challenge League.

The champions will also receive a prize of HK$350,000, while the runners-up will be awarded HK$150,000.

Tai Po were the defending champions.

== Calendar ==
Round	Draw Date	Date	Matches	Clubs
First round	29 July 2026	23 – 24 January 2027	3	11 → 8
Quarter-finals	29 July 2026	20 – 21 February 2027	4	8 → 4
Semi-finals	29 July 2026	10 – 11 April 2027	2	4 → 2
Final	29 July 2026	15 May 2027	1	2 → 1

== Bracket ==
First round
24 January 2027
Eastern
HKFC
23 January 2027
Kowloon City
Sha Tin
24 January 2027
Kitchee
Southern

Quarter-finals
20 February 2027
Eastern District
Lee Man
21 February 2027
Rangers
20 February 2027
Tai Po
21 February 2027
North District

Semi-finals
10 April 2027
11 April 2027

Final
15 May 2027

== Fixtures and results ==
=== First round ===
23 January 2027	Kowloon City	v	Sha Tin	Tseung Kwan O Sports Ground
15:00		Report

24 January 2027	Kitchee	v	Southern District	Tai Po Sports Ground
15:00		Report

24 January 2027	Eastern	v	HKFC	Tsing Yi Sports Ground
15:00		Report

=== Quarter-finals ===
20 February 2027	Eastern District	v	Lee Man	Tai Po Sports Ground
15:00		Report

20 February 2027	Tai Po	v	Tsing Yi Sports Ground
18:30		Report

21 February 2027	Rangers	v	Hammer Hill Road Sports Ground
15:00		Report

21 February 2027	North District	v	Mong Kok Stadium
18:30		Report

=== Semi-finals ===
10 April 2026	v	Mong Kok Stadium
15:00	Report

11 April 2026	v	Mong Kok Stadium
15:00	Report

=== Final ===
15 May 2027	v	Mong Kok Stadium
16:00	Report

== Top scorers ==
Rank	Player	Club	Goals
