= 2000–01 Hong Kong FA Cup =

Tournament details
- Country: Hong Kong

Final positions
- Champions: Instant-Dict (4th title)
- Runners-up: South China

2000–01 Hong Kong FA Cup was the 27th staging of the Hong Kong FA Cup.

It was competed by all of the 8 teams from Hong Kong First Division League. The competition kicked off on 8 April 2001 and finished on 29 April with the final.

Instant-Dict won the cup for the third time after beating South China by 2–1 in the final.

== Fixtures and results ==
=== Bracket ===
Quarter-finals
Instant-Dict	11
Rangers	1
Happy Valley	1
Po Chai Pills	0
Orient & Yee Hope Union	1
Sun Hei	4
South China	5
Kitchee	0

Semi-finals
Instant-Dict	3
Happy Valley	0
Sun Hei	2
South China	3

Final
Instant-Dict	2
South China	1

=== Final ===
29 April 2001

Instant-Dict	2 – 1	South China
Au Wai Lun 20'; Jancula 90'		Cheng Siu Chung 51'
