= 1998–99 Hong Kong FA Cup =

Tournament details
- Country: Hong Kong

Final positions
- Champions: South China (7th title)
- Runners-up: Instant-Dict

1998–99 Hong Kong FA Cup was the 25th staging of the Hong Kong FA Cup.

It was competed by all of the 8 teams from Hong Kong First Division League. The competition kicked off on 29 April 1999 and finished on 25 May with the final.

South China won the cup for the seventh time after beating Instant-Dict 1-0 in the final.

== Fixtures and results ==
=== Bracket ===
Quarter-finals
Instant-Dict	2
Yee Hope	1
Sing Tao	3
Rangers	2
Sai Kung Friends	1
Happy Valley	2
South China (PSO)	1 (4)
Golden	1 (2)

Semi-finals
Instant-Dict	3
Sing Tao	1
Happy Valley	0
South China	2

Final
Instant-Dict (AET)	0
South China	1

=== Final ===
25 May 1999

Instant-Dict	0 – 1 (a.e.t.)	South China
		Poon Man Tik 100'

Hong Kong Stadium
Attendance: 6,430
Referee: Wong Po On
