= 2001–02 Hong Kong FA Cup =

Tournament details
- Country: Hong Kong

Final positions
- Champions: South China (8th title)
- Runners-up: Sun Hei

2001–02 Hong Kong FA Cup was the 28th staging of the Hong Kong FA Cup.

It was competed by all of the 7 teams from Hong Kong First Division League and Fukien from the Second Division. The competition kicked off on 4 April 2002 and finished on 14 April with the final.

South China won the cup for the eighth time after beating Sun Hei by 1-0 in the final.

== Fixtures and results ==
=== Bracket ===
Quarter-finals
Sun Hei	2
Xiangxue Pharmaceutical	0
Double Flower (PSO)	1 (4)
Happy Valley	1 (2)
South China	5
HKFC	0
Buler Rangers	3
Fukien	0

Semi-finals
Sun Hei	2
Double Flower	1
South China (PSO)	0 (5)
Buler Rangers	0 (4)

Final
Sun Hei	0
South China	1
