= Sea Bee =

Sea Bee / Ernest Borel
- Full name: Sea Bee Athletic Association
- Founded: c. 1976; 49 years ago
- Dissolved: 1994; 31 years ago
- 1993–94: First Division, 8th (dissolved)

Sea Bee (Chinese: 海蜂 or 海峰), later known as Ernest Borel (Chinese: 依波路), was a Hong Kong football club which competed for many years in the Hong Kong First Division.

== History ==
The original Sea Bee FC first competed in the 1976–77 season and were runners-up twice in the Hong Kong FA Cup (1980–81, 1981–82) and they became defunct during the 1980s before the club was purchased by Ernest Borel to become Ernest Borel FC in 1988. For the 1990–91 season, they had a budget of HK$5,000,000 and finished fourth in the Hong Kong Premier League.

In 1993, the parent company of the club, Ernest Borel, loaned the right to compete in the First Division to another company, and the team competed as Voicelink (Chinese: 聲控通) during the 1993–94 season. They were dissolved in 1994.

Sea Bee won their only major trophies in 1991–92 by winning the Viceroy Cup and the Hong Kong FA Cup under the name Ernest Borel.

== Honours ==
- Hong Kong FA Cup
  - Champions (1): 1991–92
  - Runners-up (3): 1980–81, 1981–82, 1992–93
- Viceroy Cup
  - Champions (1): 1991–92
