= Yee Hope FC =

- Full name: Yee Hope Football Club
- Founded: 1992
- Dissolved: 2001

Yee Hope Football Club (Chinese: 二合足球會) was a Hong Kong football club which played in the Hong Kong First Division League between 1997 and 2001. In the 1999–2000 and 2000–01 season, the club played in the name Orient & Yee Hope Union (Chinese: 東聯二合) due to sponsorship reasons.

== Honours ==
=== Domestic ===
==== Cups ====
- Hong Kong Senior Shield
  - Winners (1): 2000–01
- Hong Kong FA Cup
  - Runners-up (1): 1999–2000
- Hong Kong Junior Shield
  - Winners (1): 1995–96
