= Hong Kong FA Cup =

Association football tournament in Hong Kong

- Founded: 1974; 52 years ago
- Region: Hong Kong
- Teams: 11 (2026–27)
- International cup: AFC Champions League Two
- Current champions: Tai Po (2nd title)
- Most championships: South China (10 titles)
- Broadcaster: TVB
- Website: hkfa.com/fa-cup
- 2026–27 Hong Kong FA Cup

Hong Kong FA Cup (Chinese: 香港足總盃) is a knockout cup competition in Hong Kong football, run by and named after the Football Association of Hong Kong. The first edition of the competition was held in 1975, before then the cup was known as the Golden Jubilee Cup. The current season is the 51st edition of the event. 14 different teams have won the cup with 10-time champions South China being the most successful.

In the first three years, the semi-finals and the finals were two-legged events. If the aggregate result was drawn, there would be extra time after the second leg. Drawn ties after extra time would be settled by a replay. However, this practice was abandoned in 1977. Since 1978, all matches have become one-legged, draws are settled by extra time and penalty shootouts.

In 2013–2016, teams from the First Division, Second Division and Third Division were allowed to enter the competition through qualifying from the preliminary round. However, due to the huge difference in playing level between the Premier League and the lower levels below it, the cup has been limited to top-flight teams since the 2016–17 season. The teams in the lower divisions are now competing in the FA Cup Junior Division.

The champion will also receive a prize of HK$350,000, while the runner-up will be awarded HK$150,000.

The current FA Cup holders are Tai Po.

== Competition name due to sponsorship ==
Season	Name
1987–88	Goldlion Holdings FA Cup
1988–89 to 1990–91	Rank Xerox Hong Kong FA Cup
1991–92 to 1992–93	Regal Films FA Cup
1993–94	Esso FA Cup
1994–95 to 1995–96	San Miguel FA Cup
1996–97 to 1998–99	No sponsorship
1999–2000	Smart-soccer.com FA Cup
2000–01 to 2002–03	No sponsorship
2003–04	Dongguan Century City FA Cup
2004–05	Xiangxue Pharmaceutical FA Cup
2005–06 to 2007–08	LANWA International FA Cup
2008–09	Sheffield United FA Cup
2009–10 to 2015–16	No sponsorship
2016–17	CODEX FA Cup
2017–18 to 2023–24	No sponsorship
2024–25 to 2025–26	Kwoon Chung Bus 60th Anniversary FA Cup

== Finals ==
=== Key ===
*	Match went to extra time
^	Match went to extra time with golden goal
†	Match decided by a penalty shootout after extra time

=== Results ===
Edition	Season	Winners	Score	Runners-up	Venue	Attendance
1	1974–75 (1)	Seiko	0–1	Rangers	Government Stadium	23,916
1	1974–75 (2)	Seiko	5–1	Rangers	Government Stadium	27,383
2	1975–76 (1)	Seiko	2–1	South China	Government Stadium	21,322
2	1975–76 (2)	Seiko	1–0	South China	Government Stadium	24,296
3	1976–77 (1)	Rangers	3–1	Tung Sing	Government Stadium	4,360
3	1976–77 (2)	Rangers	0–1	Tung Sing	Government Stadium	1,992
4	1977–78	Seiko	2–1	Blake Garden	Government Stadium	4,780
5	1978–79	Yuen Long	2–2†	Seiko	Government Stadium	16,626
6	1979–80	Seiko	3–2	Bulova	Government Stadium	19,642
7	1980–81	Seiko	2–0	Sea Bee	Government Stadium	18,816
8	1981–82	Bulova	4–1	Sea Bee	Government Stadium	7,857
9	1982–83	Bulova	3–0	Rangers	Government Stadium	3,926
10	1983–84	Eastern	2–1	Zindabad	Government Stadium	3,920
11	1984–85	South China	2–2	Harps	Government Stadium	9,207
11	1984–85 (R)	South China	3–1	Harps	Government Stadium	
12	1985–86	Seiko	2–1	South China	Government Stadium	6,637
13	1986–87	South China	4–1	Happy Valley	Government Stadium	10,972
14	1987–88	South China	2–0	Tsuen Wan	Government Stadium	1,404
15	1988–89	Lai Sun Double Flower	2–0	Tsuen Wan	Government Stadium	3,227
16	1989–90	South China	1–0	Lai Sun	Government Stadium	10,620
17	1990–91	South China	2–1	Lai Sun	Government Stadium	14,180
18	1991–92	Ernest Borel	1–0	Instant-Dict		
19	1992–93	Eastern	1–0	Ernest Borel		
20	1993–94	Eastern	4–1	Happy Valley		
21	1994–95	Rangers	3–0	Eastern		
22	1995–96	South China	4–1	Golden		
23	1996–97	Instant-Dict	2–1^	Sing Tao		
24	1997–98	Instant-Dict	3–1	South China		
25	1998–99	South China	1–0^	Instant-Dict	Hong Kong Stadium	6,430
26	1999–00	Happy Valley	7–2	Orient & Yee Hope Union	Hong Kong Stadium	4,581
27	2000–01	Instant-Dict	2–0	South China	Hong Kong Stadium	5,023
28	2001–02	South China	1–0	Sun Hei	Hong Kong Stadium	3,359
29	2002–03	Sun Hei	2–1^	Rangers	Mong Kok Stadium	1,522
30	2003–04	Happy Valley	3–1	Kitchee	Hong Kong Stadium	2,478
31	2004–05	Sun Hei	2–1*	Happy Valley	Hong Kong Stadium	1,931
32	2005–06	Sun Hei	1–0	Happy Valley	Mong Kok Stadium	2,101
33	2006–07	South China	3–1	Happy Valley	Hong Kong Stadium	6,427
34	2007–08	Citizen	2–0	Tai Po	Hong Kong Stadium	5,925
35	2008–09	Tai Po	4–2	Pegasus	Hong Kong Stadium	4,042
36	2009–10	Pegasus	2–1	Citizen	Hong Kong Stadium	3,115
37	2010–11	South China	2–1*	Tai Po	Hong Kong Stadium	3,829
38	2011–12	Kitchee	3–3†	Pegasus	Hong Kong Stadium	1,990
39	2012–13	Kitchee	1–0	Pegasus	Hong Kong Stadium	2,963
40	2013–14	Eastern	1–0*	Kitchee	Hong Kong Stadium	4,383
41	2014–15	Kitchee	2–0*	Eastern	Mong Kok Stadium	4,348
42	2015–16	Pegasus	1–1†	Yuen Long	Hong Kong Stadium	4,190
43	2016–17	Kitchee	2–1	South China	Mong Kok Stadium	5,038
44	2017–18	Kitchee	2–1	Tai Po	Hong Kong Stadium	3,044
45	2018–19	Kitchee	2–0	Southern	Hong Kong Stadium	3,655
46	2019–20	Eastern	2–0	(China) R&F	Hong Kong Stadium	0
	2020–21	Cancelled due to COVID-19 pandemic in Hong Kong				
47	2021–22	Cancelled due to COVID-19 pandemic in Hong Kong				
48	2022–23	Kitchee	7–1	Rangers	Mong Kok Stadium	3,083
49	2023–24	Eastern	3–2*	Sham Shui Po	Mong Kok Stadium	3,437
50	2024–25	Eastern	3–1	Rangers	Mong Kok Stadium	3,392
51	2025–26	Tai Po	2–1	Eastern District	Mong Kok Stadium	3,506
52	2026–27		–			

==== Notes ====
1. Match was played behind closed doors due to the 2020 coronavirus pandemic in Hong Kong.

== Results by team ==
Teams shown in italics are no longer in existence.

Team	Wins	Last final won	Runners-up	Last final lost
South China	10	2010–11	5	2016–17
Kitchee	7	2022–23	2	2013–14
Eastern	7	2024–25	2	2014–15
Seiko	6	1985–86	1	1978–79
Double Flower	4	2000–01	2	1998–99
Sun Hei	3	2005–06	2	2001–02
Happy Valley	2	2003–04	5	2006–07
Rangers	2	1994–95	5	2024–25
Pegasus	2	2015–16	3	2012–13
Tai Po	2	2025–26	3	2017–18
Bulova	2	1982–83	1	1979–80
Ernest Borel	1	1991–92	1	1992–93
Citizen	1	2007–08	1	2009–10
Yuen Long	1	1978–79	1	2015–16
Sea Bee	–	–	2	1981–82
Tsuen Wan	–	–	2	1988–89
Lai Sun	–	–	2	1990–91
Tung Sing	–	–	1	1976–77
Blake Garden	–	–	1	1977–78
Zindabad	–	–	1	1983–84
Harps	–	–	1	1984–85
Sing Tao	–	–	1	1996–97
Yee Hope	–	–	1	1999–00
Southern	–	–	1	2018–19
(China) R&F	–	–	1	2019–20
Sham Shui Po	–	–	1	2023–24
Eastern District	–	–	1	2025–26

== See also ==
- Football Association of Hong Kong, China
- Hong Kong FA Cup Junior Division
- Hong Kong Premier League
- Hong Kong First Division League
- Hong Kong Second Division League
- Hong Kong Third Division League
- Hong Kong Senior Challenge Shield
- Hong Kong Sapling Cup
