= South China AA =

Hong Kong professional sports club

Coordinates: 22°16′32″N 114°11′15″E

South China
- Full name: South China Athletic Association (南華體育會)
- Nicknames: Shaolin Temple (少林寺); The Caroliners
- Founded: 1910; 116 years ago (as South China Football Team)
- Ground: South China AA-Jockey Club Stadium
- President: Andy Lo
- Head coach: Ku Kam Fai
- League: Hong Kong First Division
- 2025–26: First Division, 3rd of 14
Home colours	Away colours

South China AA
- Traditional Chinese: 南華體育會
- Simplified Chinese: 南华体育会
Transcriptions
Standard Mandarin
- Hanyu Pinyin: Nánhuá tǐyù huì
Yue: Cantonese
- Jyutping: Naam^{4} Waa^{4} tai^{2} juk^{6} wui^{6}

South China Athletic Association (known simply as South China, SCAA, Chinese: 南華體育會) is a Hong Kong professional sports club with a football team competing in the Hong Kong First Division, the second-tier league in Hong Kong football league system. The club is historically one of the most successful football clubs in Asia, having won a record 41 First Division titles, a record 31 Senior Shields, a record 10 FA Cups and 3 League Cups. The club has a long history in playing in the top-tier league, but decided to self-relegate after the end of the 2016–17 season.

Nicknamed "Shaolin Temple" and "Caroliners", South China has produced many great Hong Kong footballers over the years. In November 2007, the club entered into a charity partnership with Hong Kong Red Cross. The partnership is a pioneer between a sports association and a humanitarian organisation in Hong Kong.The club plays its home matches at Happy Valley Recreation Ground.

They are known to be the most successful club in Asia based on league titles.

== History ==
=== Early history ===
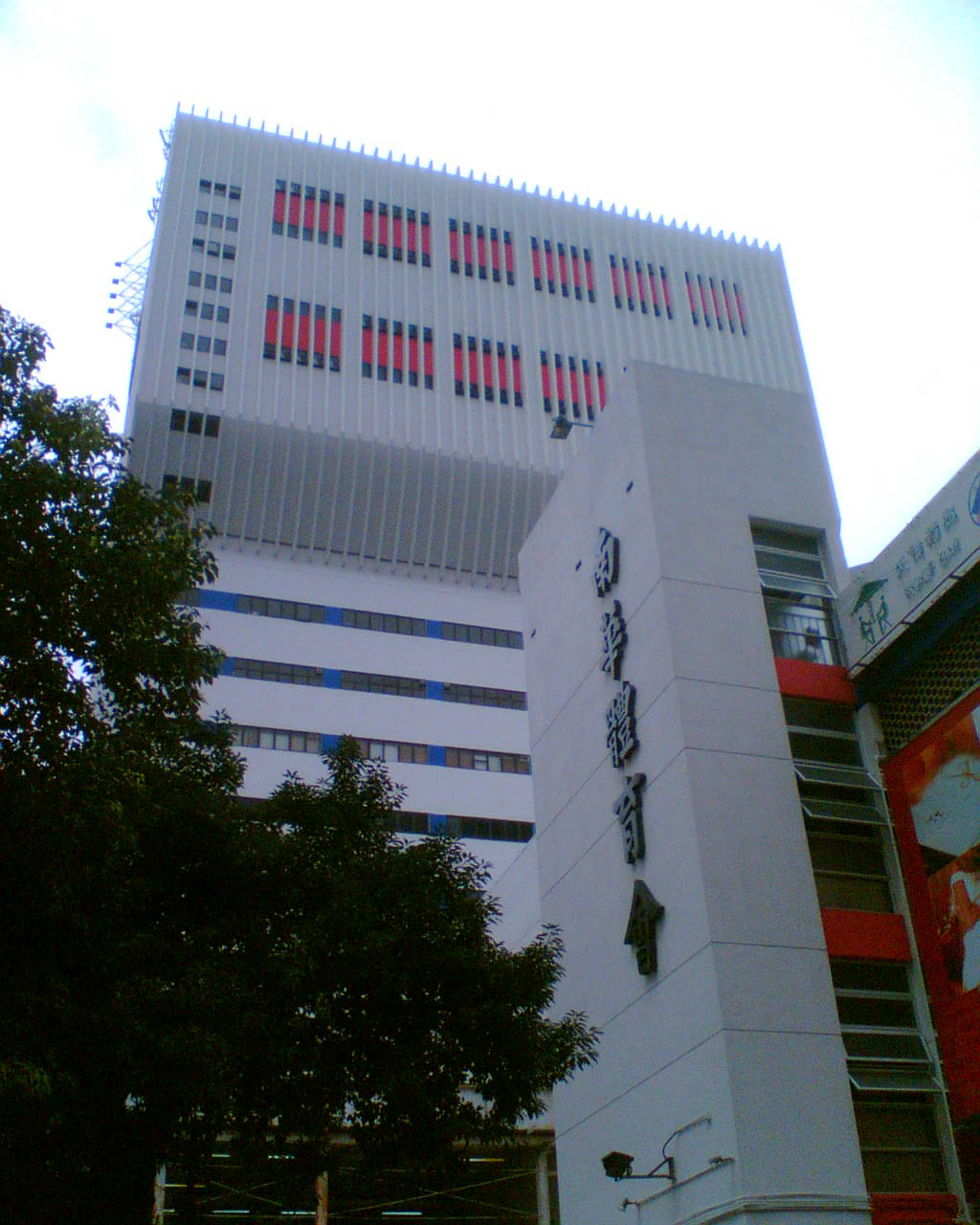
The club house building on Caroline Hill.

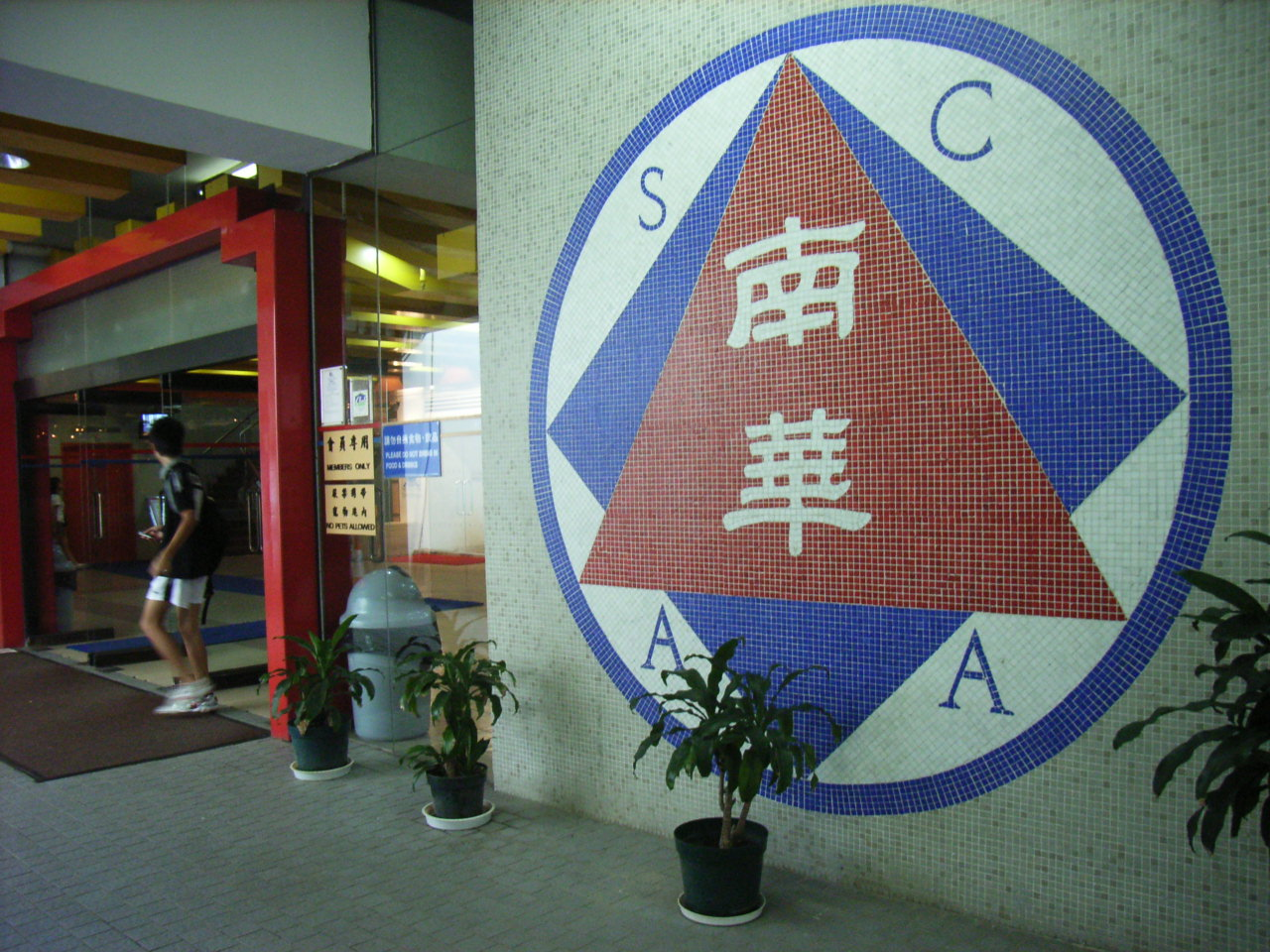
The club's entrance on Caroline Hill.

The Chinese Football Team was founded in 1904 by a group of Chinese students in Hong Kong, including Mok Hing (Chinese: 莫慶) and Tong Fuk Cheung (Chinese: 唐福祥, the captain of China national football team in the 1910s).

In 1910, the team was renamed as South China Football Club and formally adopted the present name of South China Athletic Association in the 1920s.

In the 1917 Far Eastern Games and 1919 Far Eastern Games (also known as the Far East Olympics Tournament), the club represented the Republic of China and won the football championship. It is the only team in Hong Kong sports history to have accomplished this feat. China lost in the final to the Philippines in the first to be held, in 1913, but in the next nine it won every time, right through until the last FECG to be held in 1934. On that occasion China was a joint winner with Japan. Throughout these tournaments, the majority of the China team was composed of SCAA players.

Amid the post-WWII competition from league rivals like Eastern, Kitchee, Seiko, KMB, Sing Tao, Jardine, Lai Sun, Bulova, Happy Valley and Double Flower, SCAA remained a regular participant in the top-tier league and achieved sustained success during the period.

In 1920, South China which began as a club called the South China Athletic Association founded by Mok Hing.

In Asian competitions, South China were runners-up in the 1993–94 Asian Cup Winners' Cup final against Al Qadsiah, after having lost 2-6 on aggregate. Nonetheless, this is to date still the best result for Hong Kong clubs in Asian competitions.

Around 1920–1922, the club formally adopted the present name of South China Athletic Association and diversified into other sports such as basketball.

Outside Hong Kong and Asia, South China not only played in international club friendlies against Santos, Juventus, Tottenham Hotspur and LA Galaxy, they also had produced many Hong Kong footballers over the years.

=== 1980s ===
Since its foundation, South China had a Chinese only policy whereby the club would only field players of Chinese ethnicity. In keeping with this policy, the club would only sign foreign players who had Chinese ancestry such as Edmund Wee, Chow Chee Keong and Chan Kwok Leung. Up until the 1980s, the policy did not have a negative effect on results.

However, when professional football took off in Hong Kong, the club could not cope with the influx of foreign players and performed poorly at the beginning of the 1981–82 season. Therefore, on 2 November 1981 the club voted to end its six decade old Chinese only policy. Although the club was able to avoid relegation that season, it was not incident-free. On 6 June 1982, after the club drew an all-important match with Caroline Hill, the fans rioted outside the stadium that spread onto Causeway Bay. The riot was the largest civil disorder in Hong Kong since the leftist riot in 1967.

=== 2000s ===
As they failed to beat Citizen in the last game of the 2005–06 season, South China was to be relegated for the first time since 1983. However, on 14 June 2006, the Hong Kong Football Association approved a request from South China to remain in the Hong Kong First Division with the promise of strengthening their squad. Staying true to their word, South China heavily strengthened their squad and coaching staff. As a result, South China successfully regained the First Division League title in the 2006–07 season, and also winning the Hong Kong FA Cup and the Hong Kong Senior Shield, achieving the famous treble.

The team has gone from strength to strength, while the team has had continued success on the domestic front, winning three consecutive league titles in the process, it has also had success in other international club competitions. The team has reached the semi-finals of the 2009 AFC Cup. South China's success has seen the team climb in world club rankings to their new high of 145th, even surpassing other mainland Chinese clubs which are widely considered to be of a better standard than clubs in Hong Kong. In recent years the South China has taken part in several pre-season exhibition matches with European clubs, with the most notable being a 2–0 win against the English Premier League side Tottenham Hotspur.

Much of the recent success has been attributed to the former chairman, Steven Lo, and with his shrewd business sense he rebuilt the team as a brand, and played a major role in reigniting interest in the Hong Kong Football League. South China has reinvented their image and have partnered with several organisations and brands. In 2007, South China has enter into a partnership with Hong Kong Red Cross. The partnership is a pioneer between a sports association and a humanitarian organisation in Hong Kong, and South China is the first football team to ever bear the Red Cross emblem on the official kit. The appointment of the fashion brand Giorgio Armani as the official tailor, has allowed South China to join some of the world's elite, with the brand being associated with Chelsea Football Club and the England national team. In celebration of the 100th Anniversary of the establishment of South China Football Team, world-renowned designer Philippe Starck produced a special edition of the "Peninsula Chair", with the faces of the team and the chairman printed on.

Nicky Butt and Mateja Kežman played for South China during the 2010–11 season.

South China kits from the late 90s and early 2000s are considered as some of the finest works by sportswear giants, Adidas. They often feature highly in top kit rankings.

=== 2010s ===
Ahead of the 2014–15 season, AET chairman Wallace Cheung became the conveynor of the club, promising to spend $18–20 million per season. The domestic season was not initially a successful one as the club finished fourth in the league and did not win any silverware. The saving grace was a Season Playoff victory which allowed the club to directly qualify for the 2016 AFC Cup group stage.

=== Recent times ===
After making changes to the squad and coaching staff team, South China saw success in the 2006–07 season, reaching the semi-finals of the 2009 AFC Cup.

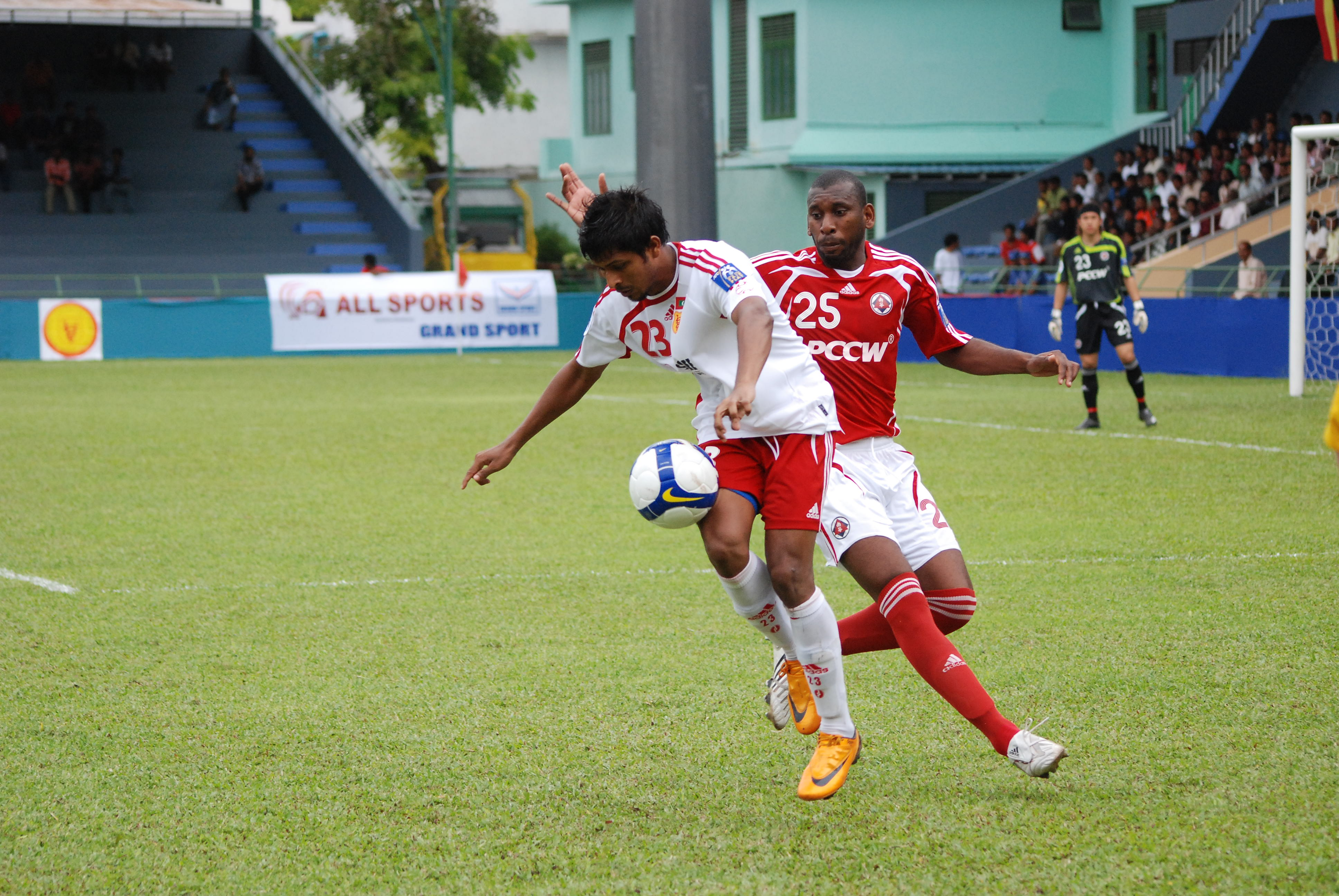
South China player (in red) in action against Victory Sports Club during the 2008 AFC Cup match at the Maldives National Stadium.

Ahead of the 2014–15 season, AET chairman Wallace Cheung became the chairman of the club, promising to spend $18–20 million per season.

However, South China's performance in the HKPL era had suffered, as they struggled to keep up against rivals Kitchee and Eastern.

On 5 June 2017, South China announced their self-relegation into the First Division and parted ways with Cheung, fielding an amateur squad with young players ever since.

== Retired numbers ==
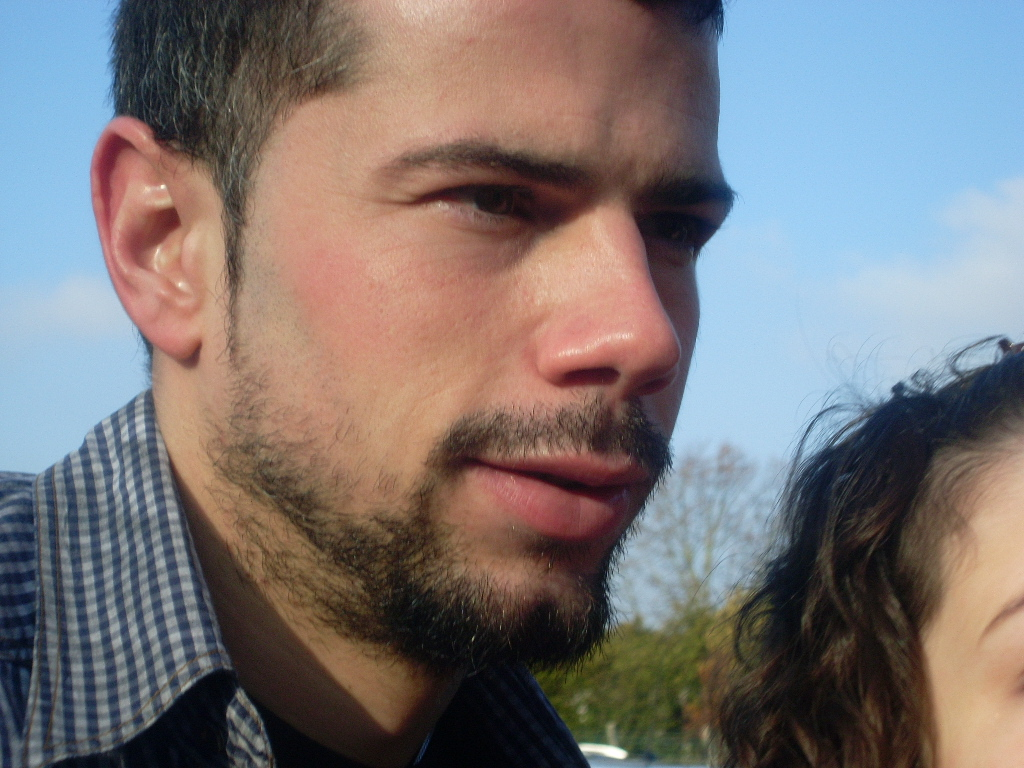
Mateja Kežman ended his professional football career with South China

No.	Player	Nationality	Position	Years	Ref
38	Mateja Kežman	Serbia	Forward	2011, 2012	

== Honours ==
Historically, the most popular club in the city, SCAA is also the most successful football club in Hong Kong.

In November 2001, the team was awarded the AFC Team of the Month by the Asian Football Confederation.

=== League ===
- Hong Kong First Division
  - Champions (41): 1923–24, 1930–31, 1932–33, 1934–35, 1935–36, 1937–38, 1938–39, 1939–40, 1940–41, 1948–49, 1950–51, 1951–52, 1952–53, 1954–55, 1956–57, 1957–58, 1958–59, 1959–60, 1960–61, 1961–62, 1965–66, 1967–68, 1968–69, 1971–72, 1973–74, 1975–76, 1976–77, 1977–78, 1985–86, 1986–87, 1987–88, 1989–90, 1990–91, 1991–92, 1996–97, 1999–2000, 2006–07, 2007–08, 2008–09, 2009–10, 2012–13
- Hong Kong Second Division
  - Champions (5): 1917–18, 1925–26, 1933–34, 1951–52, 1952–53

=== Cup competitions ===
- Hong Kong Senior Shield
  - Champions (31): 1928–29, 1930–31, 1932–33, 1934–35, 1935–36, 1936–37, 1937–38, 1938–39, 1940–41, 1948–49, 1954–55, 1956–57, 1957–58, 1958–59, 1960–61, 1961–62, 1964–65, 1971–72, 1985–86, 1987–88, 1988–89, 1990–91, 1995–96, 1996–97, 1998–99, 1999–2000, 2001–02, 2002–03, 2006–07, 2009–10, 2013–14
- Hong Kong FA Cup
  - Champions (10): 1984–85, 1986–87, 1987–88, 1989–90, 1990–91, 1995–96, 1998–99, 2001–02, 2006–07, 2010–11
- Hong Kong League Cup
  - Champions (3): 2001–02, 2007–08, 2010–11
- Hong Kong Viceroy Cup
  - Champions (8): 1971–72, 1979–80, 1986–87, 1987–88, 1990–91, 1992–93, 1993–94, 1997–98
- Hong Kong Community Cup
  - Champions (2): 2014, 2015
- Hong Kong Junior Shield
  - Champions (9): 1947–48, 1950–51, 1952–53, 1953–54, 1954–55, 1956–57, 1957–58, 1958–59, 1966–67
- Hong Kong FA Cup Junior Division
  - Champions (1): 2024–25

== Continental record ==
Season	Competition	Round	Club	Home	Away	Aggregate
1986	Asian Club Championship	Group C	(China) Liaoning FC	0–1		3rd
1986	Asian Club Championship	Group C	(Indonesia) Krama Yudha Tiga Berlian	1–1		3rd
1987	Asian Club Championship	Group 6	(Japan) Yomiuri FC	0–1	0–2	2nd
1988–89	Asian Club Championship	Group 6	(North Korea) April 25	0–3		4th
1988–89	Asian Club Championship	Group 6	(China) Guangdong Wanbao	0–1		4th
1988–89	Asian Club Championship	Group 6	(Japan) Yamaha Motors	1–1		4th
1988–89	Asian Club Championship	Group 6	(Macau) Wa Seng	3–0		4th
1991	Asian Club Championship	First round	Sporting de Macau	9–1	5–0	14–1
1991	Asian Club Championship	Second round	(Japan) Yomiuri FC	1–0	1–3	2–4
1993–94	Asian Cup Winners' Cup	First round	(China) Dalian Haichang	2–0	1–0	2–1
1993–94	Asian Cup Winners' Cup	Second round	(India) East Bengal	1–0	4–1	5–1
1993–94	Asian Cup Winners' Cup	Quarter-final	bye			
1993–94	Asian Cup Winners' Cup	Semi-final	(Japan) Nissan	(w/o)		
1993–94	Asian Cup Winners' Cup	Final	(Saudi Arabia) Al-Qadsiah	2–4	0–2	2–6
1997–98	Asian Club Championship	First round	(Malaysia) Selangor FA	0–0	2–0	2–0
1997–98	Asian Club Championship	Second round	(China) Dalian Wanda	0–4	2–1	2–5
2000–01	Asian Club Championship	Second round	(Japan) Júbilo Iwata	1–3	1–3	2–6
2002–03	2002–03 AFC Champions League; Qualification Round 1	Second round	(Singapore) Home United	2–1	1–1	3–2
2002–03	2002–03 AFC Champions League; Qualification Round 1	Third round	(Japan) Shimizu S-Pulse	0–5	1–3	1–8
2008	AFC Cup	Group D	(Singapore) Home United	2–3	1–4	3rd
2008	AFC Cup	Group D	(Maldives) Victory SC	3–0	0–0	3rd
2008	AFC Cup	Group D	(Malaysia) Kedah FA	1–3	0–3	3rd
2009	AFC Cup	Group F	(Indonesia) PSMS Medan	3–0	2–2	1st
2009	AFC Cup	Group F	(Maldives) VB	2–1	2–1	1st
2009	AFC Cup	Group F	(Malaysia) Johor FC	2–0	4–1	1st
2009	AFC Cup	Round of 16	(Singapore) Home United	4–0		
2009	AFC Cup	Quarter-final	(Uzbekistan) Neftchi Farg'ona	1–0	4–5	5–5 (a)
2009	AFC Cup	Semi-final	Al-Kuwait	0–1	1–2	1–3
2010	AFC Cup	Group G	(Thailand) Muangthong United	0–0	1–0	1st
2010	AFC Cup	Group G	(Maldives) VB	3–1	0–1	1st
2010	AFC Cup	Group G	(Indonesia) Persiwa Wamena	6–3	2–0	1st
2010	AFC Cup	Round of 16	(Bahrain) Al-Riffa	1–3		
2011	AFC Cup	Group H	(Thailand) Muangthong United	1–1	2–4	3rd
2011	AFC Cup	Group H	(Thailand) Chonburi FC	0–3	0–3	3rd
2011	AFC Cup	Group H	(India) Kingfisher East Bengal	1–0	3–3	3rd
2014	AFC Cup	Group G	(Vietnam) Vissai Ninh Bình	1–3	1–1	3rd
2014	AFC Cup	Group G	(Malaysia) Kelantan FA	4–0	0–2	3rd
2014	AFC Cup	Group G	(Myanmar) Yangon United	5–3	0–2	3rd
2015	AFC Cup	Group G	(Philippines) Global FC	3–0	6–1	1st
2015	AFC Cup	Group G	(Malaysia) Pahang FA	3–1	1–0	1st
2015	AFC Cup	Group G	(Myanmar) Yadanarbon	3–1	3–0	1st
2015	AFC Cup	Round of 16	(India) Bengaluru FC	2–0		
2015	AFC Cup	Quarter-final	(Malaysia) Johor Darul Ta'zim	1–1	1–3	2–4
2016	AFC Cup	Group G	(Myanmar) Yangon United	2–1	1–2	2nd
2016	AFC Cup	Group G	(India) Mohun Bagan	0–4	3–0	2nd
2016	AFC Cup	Group G	(Maldives) Maziya	2–0	1–2	2nd
2016	AFC Cup	Round of 16	(Philippines) Ceres	1–0(aet)		
2016	AFC Cup	Quarter-final	(Malaysia) Johor Darul Ta'zim	1–1	1–2	2–3

== Notable players ==
Hong Kong

- (Hong Kong) (Taiwan) Leung Yuk Tong (梁玉堂)
- (Hong Kong) (Taiwan) Lee Wai Tong (李惠堂)
- (Hong Kong) (Taiwan) Yiu Cheuk Yin (姚卓然)
- (Hong Kong) Ho Cheung Yau, MBE (何祥友)
- (Hong Kong) (Taiwan) Wong Chi Keung (黃志強)
- (Hong Kong) (Taiwan) Wong Man Wai (黃文偉) (1967–69), (1972–82)
- (Hong Kong) (Taiwan) Chan Kwok Hung (陳國雄) (1972–78)
- (Hong Kong) (Taiwan) Kwok Kam Hung (郭錦洪)
- (Hong Kong) Choi York Yee (蔡育瑜) (1973–78), (1980–83)
- (Hong Kong) Chan Sai Kau (陳世九) (1968–78)
- (Hong Kong) Fung Chi Ming (馮志明)
- (Hong Kong) Sze Kin Hei (施建熙)
- (Hong Kong) Wu Kwok Hung (胡國雄) (1971–72)
- (Hong Kong) Ku Kam Fai (顧錦輝) (1984–99)
- (Hong Kong) Wan Chi Keung (尹志強)
- (Hong Kong) Cheung Chi Tak (張志德) (1984–87)
- (Hong Kong) Chan Fat Chi (陳發枝)
- (Hong Kong) (England) Tim Bredbury (巴貝利) (1985–88)
- (Hong Kong) (Portugal) (England) Leslie Santos (山度士) (1980–98)
- (Hong Kong) (England) Dale Tempest (譚拔士) (1989–91)
- (Hong Kong) (England) Richard Lant Armstrong (岩士唐) (1991–92), (1994–95)
- (Hong Kong) Shum Kwok Pui (岑國培) (1986–05)
- (Hong Kong) Lee Kin Wo (李健和) (1995–03)
- (Hong Kong) Au Wai Lun (歐偉倫) (1993–99), (1999–07)
- (Hong Kong) Yau Kin Wai (丘建威) (1995–05)
- (Hong Kong) (Costa Rica) Cheng Siu Chung (鄭兆聰) (1996), (1998–00), (2001–02)
- (Hong Kong) (China) Sung Linyung (宋連勇) (1993–97)
- (Hong Kong) (Brazil) Cristiano Cordeiro (高尼路) (1998–03)

Austria

- (Austria) Franz Blizenec (1998)

Australia

- (Australia) (Scotland) Robbie Dunn (鄧尼) (1989–90)
- (Australia) Ross Greer (基亞) (1990–92)
- (Australia) George Haniotis (漢尼迪) (1992–93)
- (Australia) Steve Hickman (希文) (1993–94)
- (Australia) David Clarkson (卡臣) (1994–95)
- (Australia) Kris Trajanovski (卓真洛奇) (1994–95)
- (Australia) Stephen Aravena (艾維拉) (1995–96)
- (Australia) (Croatia) Andrew Barisic (2013–14)

Belgium

- (Belgium) Peter Geraerts (彼德) (1997–98)

Bosnia and Herzegovina

- (Hong Kong) (Bosnia and Herzegovina) Anto Grabo (基保) (1992–95)
- (Bosnia and Herzegovina) Alen Bajkusa (巴古沙) (1993–94), (1995–96)
- (Bosnia and Herzegovina) Saša Kajkut (2013–14)

Brazil

- (Brazil) Rodrigues Neto (尼圖)
- (Brazil) da Silva Aurelio (奧拿里奧) (1995–98)
- (Brazil) Ailton Grigorio de Araujo (阿拉烏蘇) (1998–00)
- (Brazil) José Ricardo Rambo (列卡度) (1998–99)
- (Brazil) Aderbal Pericles Farias Filho (仙奴) (2000–02)
- (Brazil) Detinho (迪天奴) (2006–09), (2014–15)
- (Brazil) Sidraílson (沙域臣) (2007–09), (2009–10)
- (Brazil) Itaparica (伊達) (2007–08), (2012–13), (2014–2015)
- (Brazil) Maxwell (麥士維) (2007–08), (2008)
- (Brazil) Cacá (卡卡) (2009)
- (Brazil) Ramón (雷文) (2009)
- (Brazil) Leandro Carrijó (卡尼祖) (2009), (2010), (2012)

Canada

- (Canada) Paris Nakajima-Farran (中島法蘭) (2011–12)

China

- (China) He Jia (何佳) (1983–86)
- (China) Chang Weikang (張惠康) (1991–92)
- (China) (Hong Kong) Wu Qunli (吳群立) (1993–98)
- (China) Gong Lei (宮磊) (1997–98)
- (China) Zhang Enhua (張恩華) (2005–06)
- (China) Du Ping (杜蘋) (2007)

Denmark

- (Denmark) Carsten Nielsen (黎路臣) (1981–82)
- (Denmark) Graham Easter (依士達) (1997–98)
- (Denmark) Jeppe Larson (拿臣) (1997–98)

Ecuador

- (Ecuador) Félix Borja (2016)

England

- (England) Keith Robson (基夫笠臣) (1983)
- (England) Chris Lynam (拉南) (1983–85)
- (England) Tommy Langley (連尼) (1985–86)
- (England) Barry Powell (包維) (1985–86)
- (England) Trevor Morgan (摩根) (1991–93)
- (England) Steve Neville (尼福) (1991–93)
- (England) Brian McDermott (麥達莫) (1992–93)
- (England) Billy Whitehurst (韋靴斯) (1992–93)
- (England) Fenippe Anderson (安德遜) (1996–97)
- (England) Iain Hesford (希福特) (1997–98)
- (England) Mike Leonard (李安納) (1998–00)
- (England) Nicky Butt (畢特) (2010–11)

Germany

- (Germany) Klaus-Dieter Jank (楊確) (1981–83)

Indonesia

- (Indonesia) Rochy Putiray (佩迪里) (2002–03)

Malaysia

- (Malaysia) Chow Chee Keong (仇志強) (1971–74)
- (Malaysia) Chan Kwok Leung (陳國良)

Netherlands

- (Netherlands) Cees Storm (史唐) (1982–83)
- (Netherlands) Arie Haan (海恩) (1984)
- (Netherlands) Werner Kooistra (威拿) (1993–97)
- (Netherlands) Marcel Leisdek (馬些路) (1993–95)
- (Netherlands) (Hong Kong) Marlon Ricardo van der Sander (尹迪辛達) (1993–94)
- (Netherlands) Dennis Koffyberg (哥夫) (1993–94)
- (Netherlands) Neils Gerestein (卓斯) (1993–94)
- (Netherlands) Ad Roos (路殊) (1993–94)
- (Netherlands) Piet Drommel (杜武) (1994)

New Zealand

- (New Zealand) Robert Ironside (艾朗西) (1995–96)

Northern Ireland

- (Northern Ireland) Chris McGrath (麥格夫) (1983–85)
- (Northern Ireland) Allen McKnight (麥禮) (1992–94)

Paraguay

- (Paraguay) (United States) Gerardo Laterza (謝利) (1999–01)

Portugal

- (Portugal) Pedro Xavier (沙維亞) (1995–98)

Scotland

- (Scotland) Billy Semple (森寶) (1982–83)
- (Scotland) Alex Miller (米勒) (1983)
- (Scotland) Walker McCall (麥哥) (1983)
- (Scotland) Willie Johnston (韋利莊士東) (1983)
- (Scotland) Derek Parlane (柏蘭尼) (1985–86)
- (Scotland) Max Christie (基斯迪) (1992–93)
- (Scotland) Frank McAvennie (麥艾雲尼) (1992–93)
- (Scotland) Lee Bullen (李布倫) (1997)

Singapore

- (Singapore) Edmund Wee (黃文財) (1981–83), (1984–88)

Slovakia

- (Slovakia) Martin Jancula (甄馬田) (2001–02)

South Africa

- (South Africa) John Paskin (柏斯堅) (1984–85)

South Korea

- (South Korea) Kim Yeon-Gun (金永健) (2009)

Sweden

- (Sweden) Joakim Grandelius (格烈治) (1997–98)
- (Sweden) Thomas Walfridsson (華域臣) (1997–98)

Togo

- (Togo) (Brazil) Cris (基斯) (2006–07), (2007–09)

Trinidad and Tobago

- (Trinidad and Tobago) Thomas Sheldon (施頓) (1997–98)

Venezuela

- (Venezuela) Fernando de Ornelas (奧尼拉斯) (1998–99), (2000–01)

Former Yugoslavia (current Serbia)

- (Federal Republic of Yugoslavia) Marko Perinović (柏連奴域) (1993–94)
- (Federal Republic of Yugoslavia) Radislav Ignjić (拉迪斯拉夫) (1996–98)
- (Federal Republic of Yugoslavia) Željko Rolović (洛奴域) (1996–97)
- (Federal Republic of Yugoslavia) Željko Gavrilović (加連奴域) (1999–01)
- (Serbia and Montenegro) Mateja Kežman (基士文) (2011), (2012)

== Coaches ==
As of 30 May 2014. Only competitive matches are counted. Wins, losses and draws are results at the final whistle; the results of penalty shoot-outs are not counted.

Name		Nat	From	To	Record							Honours
English	Chinese	Nat	From	To	P	W	D	L	F	A	%W	Honours
Chu Kwok Lun	朱國倫		1954	1970	?							
Kwok Shek	郭石		1970	1977	?							
Ng Wai Man	吳偉文		1977	1981	?							
Halla	漢拿		1981	1982	?							
Kwok Kam Hung	郭錦洪		1982	1982	?							
Peter Wong	黃興桂		1982	1983	?							
Alex Miller	米勒		1983	1983	?							
Ng Wai Man	吳偉文		1983	1984	?							
Casemiro Mior	米路		1998	2002	?							
Wong Man Wai	黃文偉		2002	2006	?							
Chan Kwok Hung	陳國雄		2002	2006	?							
Ku Kam Fai	顧錦輝		2002	2006	?							
Jorge Amaral	阿曼龍		2006	24 Nov 2006	10	6	2	2	20	13	60	
Ku Kam Fai* & Chan Kwok Hung*	顧錦輝 & 陳國雄		25 Nov 2006	27 Nov 2006	1	1	0	0	5	2	100	
Casemiro Mior	米路		28 Nov 2006	2007	20	15	3	2	49	15	75	1 First Division title, 1 Senior Shield, 1 FA Cup title
José Luís	路爾斯		2007	2008	34	19	4	11	79	41	55.9	1 First Division title, 1 League Cup title
Tsang Wai Chung	曾偉忠		1 July 2008	Sept 17, 2008	1	0	1	0	1	1	0	
Liu Chun Fai*	廖俊輝		Sept 17, 2008	7 Dec 2008	11	9	1	1	30	7	81.8	
Kim Pan-Gon	金判坤		8 Dec 2008	11 Dec 2010	27	19	4	4	72	16	70.4	2 First Division titles, 1 Senior Shield title
Chan Ho Yin*	陳浩然		11 Dec 2010	28 June 2011	28	17	3	8	59	34	60.7	1 League Cup title, 1 FA Cup title
Ján Kocian	高世安		28 June 2011	9 July 2012	26	13	9	4	61	30	50.0	
Liu Chun Fai	廖俊輝		9 July 2012	30 June 2013	28	16	6	6	63	28	57.1	1 First Division title
Cheung Po Chun	張寶春		1 July 2013	17 February 2014								1 Senior Shield title
Yeung Ching Kwong	楊正光		17 February 2014	15 December 2014								1 Community Cup title
Mario Gómez	馬里奧		15 December 2014	30 April 2015	18	10	4	4	33	18	55.6	
Ricardo Rambo*	列卡度		1 May 2015	14 May 2015	3	2	0	1	6	1	66.7	
Casemiro Mior	米路		14 May 2015		3	2	1	0	5	1	66.7	
Amir Alagić			2016	2017								

Key
* Served as caretaker manager.

== Branding and partnerships ==
=== Hong Kong Red Cross ===
In 2007, South China entered into a partnership with Hong Kong Red Cross.

The partnership is a pioneer between a sports association and a humanitarian organisation in Hong Kong.

South China is the first football team to ever bear the Red Cross emblem on the official kit.

=== Giorgio Armani ===
South China previously appointed Giorgio Armani as their official tailor.

=== Philippe Starck ===
In celebration of the 100th Anniversary of the establishment of South China Football Team, world-renowned designer Philippe Starck produced a special edition of the "Peninsula Chair", with the faces of the team and the chairman printed on.

=== Tottenham Hotspur ===
On 3 November 2009, South China and Tottenham Hotspur jointly announced a club partnership in Hong Kong.

South China became the first club partner of Spurs in Asia. The partnership was for 2 years with an option to extend further.

Besides planning inandring of best practice in any areas of the technical and business sides of football, Tottenham had the first option on South China players at all age levels and supported South China's coaching development through the exchange of scientific data, coaching materials and visits of coaching staffs to and from both teams.

The two clubs explored the possibility of a joint youth Academy and training centre in Hong Kong or in mainland China.

=== Palace Skateboards ===
In February 2026 Palace Skateboards celebrated its official entry into Hong Kong with a localized capsule collection that bridges British streetwear and traditional Chinese philosophy.

A major highlight is the official collaboration with South China, featuring a co-branded tracksuit, jersey, and cap that celebrate the city's sports heritage.The exclusive range also includes varsity jackets, hoodies, and T-shirts featuring Palace's reinterpretations of dragon and yin-yang motifs, blending ancient symbolism with modern graphic design.

=== Other former club-level partnerships ===
- (Brazil) Sport Club Internacional
- (Japan) Yokohama F. Marinos
- (Portugal) S.L. Benfica
- (Portugal) C.D. Nacional
- (Ecuador) C.D. Cuenca
- (South Africa) SuperSport United F.C.
- (United States) San Jose Earthquakes

== Songs ==
=== 南華歌 ("The song of South China") ===
A new official cheering song for SCAA. It was introduced in the first home match in the 2006–07 season against HKFC.

The demo version of the song can be accessed on www.bma.com.hk.

=== 擁南躉之歌 ("The song of SCAA fans") ===
It was sung by Albert Cheung (張武孝, also known as 大AI or Big Al), and became well known after being released during the late 1970s and the 1980s, when they're a perennial challenger for the top spots in the league.

== Miscellaneous ==
=== "All Chinese policy" ===
Since its foundation, South China had a Chinese only policy whereby the club would only field players of Chinese ethnicity.

In keeping with this policy, the club would only sign foreign players who had Chinese ancestry such as Edmund Wee, Chow Chee Keong and Chan Kwok Leung.

Up until the 1980s, the policy did not have a negative effect on results. However, when professional football took off in Hong Kong, the club could not cope with the influx of foreign players and performed poorly at the beginning of the 1981–82 season.

Therefore, on 2 November 1981, the club voted to end its six decade old Chinese only policy.

=== Fan behaviour ===
On 6 June 1982, after the club drew an all-important match with Caroline Hill that relegated them, the fans rioted outside the stadium that spread onto Causeway Bay. The riot was the largest civil disorder in Hong Kong since the leftist riot in 1967, prompting the HKFA to intervene.

South China was to be relegated for the first time since 1983 as they failed to beat Citizen in the last game of the 2005–06 season. However, on 14 June, the Hong Kong Football Association approved a request from South China to remain in the First Division with the promise of strengthening their squad.

== Other sports ==
Aside from football, SCAA fields other sports teams, including but are not limited to, basketball, volleyball, swimming, shooting and archery. They field youth teams in the name of "Nam Ching", meaning "SCAA Youth" in Chinese.
