= Sing Tao SC =

Defunct Hong Kong football club

Sing Tao
- Full name: Sing Tao Sports Club Limited
- Founded: 1940
- Dissolved: 1999
- Owner: Sing Tao Limited
Home colours	Away colours

Sing Tao Sports Club (Chinese: 星島體育會) was a Hong Kong football club which was dissolved after the 1998–99 season. The club was established by Aw Hoe (Chinese: 胡好), a director of Sing Tao Daily in 1940. The first team made their first appearance in the first division in the 1940–41 season. The team relegated to the second division twice, in 1962–63 and 1972–73 seasons respectively. The club turned professional in the 1968–69 season. They were promoted back to the first division again in 1987–88 and stayed until it was dissolved in 1999 by Sing Tao Limited, at that time a subsidiary of Sing Tao Holdings.

== Honours ==
=== League ===
- Hong Kong First Division

Champions (1): 1946–47

=== Cup ===
- Hong Kong Senior Shield

Champions (6): 1946–47, 1947–48, 1951–52, 1966–67, 1969–70, 1991–92

- Hong Kong Viceroy Cup:

Champions (2): 1994–95, 1996–97

== Former players ==
1. Players that have played/managed in a fully professional league.

- (England) Paul Morrell

2. Players with full international caps.

- (England) Ricky Reina
- (Scotland) Ralph Milne
- (China) Hsu King
- (England) Jamie Southon
- (Wales) Glyn Hodges
- (Scotland) Andy Kennedy
- (England) Rudi Hedman
