= Double Flower FA =

Double Flower
- Full name: Double Flower Football Association
- Founded: 1979; 47 years ago
- Capacity: 1,000
- President: Tam Wai Tong
- League: Hong Kong Second Division
- 2025–26: Third Division, 2nd of 16 (promoted)
- Website: https://www.facebook.com/profile.php?id=100086170966438
Home colours	Away colours

Double Flower Football Association (Chinese: 花花足球會) is a Hong Kong football club which plays in the Hong Kong Second Division. The club was very successful in the 1990s in the then top-tier First Division under the name Instant-Dict (Chinese: 快譯通).

== Major events ==
- 1981–82 season: The club finished second in the Third Division and were promoted to Second Division.
- 1984–85 season: The club finished third in the Second Division and were promoted to First Division, then the top league in Hong Kong football.
- 1985–86 season: The club faced Seiko in their First Division debut, in which they led 3–2 at the beginning of the second half but then conceded 5 goals and lost the match 3–7. They then made remarkable progress and managed a goalless draw with Seiko when the two teams met again in the second half of the league. They eventually finished 5th in the league. They also won a 5-a-side tournament in December 1985. They were one of the teams taking part in the Super Six Cup. First-choice goalkeeper Lau Tung Ping was called up by Kwok Ka Ming to the Hong Kong national football team.
- 1986–87 season: Horse trainer Brian Kan was appointed president of the club. Due to their excellent performance in the previous season and the HKFA's ban on foreign players, many key players left the team for other clubs like South China AA, Happy Valley AA and Sea Bee. The club fielded a young side and narrowly avoided relegation by finishing sixth in the league ahead of the Hong Kong Football Club on better goal difference. The latter then complained to the Hong Kong ICAC alleging match-fixing by the club in their last three league victories over Tsuen Wan (4–3), HK Police (2–0) and South China AA (1–0). Several players and other personnel, including Kan, were arrested but later released without charge. No further action was taken by the ICAC or Hong Kong FA due to insufficient evidence.
- 1987–88 season: Double Flower finished 5th in the 1st division.
- 1988–89 season: The HKFA membership of Double Flower was loaned to Lai Sun, who played in the league under the name Lai Sun Double Flower. The team won the Viceroy Cup and FA Cup this season.
- 1989–90 season: Lai Sun bought the membership of Po Chai; Double Flower played in the league under the original name.
- 1991–92 season: the HKFA membership of the team was loaned to Instant-Dict, a company specialising in English-Chinese translation machines and dictionaries. The team played in the league under the name Instant-Dict until 2001.
- 2001–02 season: Instant-Dict returned the membership; the team reverted to the name to Double Flower.
- 2002–03 season: Relegated to the Second Division after finishing 7th out of 8 teams.
- 2009–10 season: Advance SC used the membership to participate in the Second Division, under the name Advance Double Flower.
- 2011–11 season: Reverted the name back to Double Flower.
- 2013–14 season: After the First Division became the second-tier league, all clubs previously in the Second Division, including Double Flower, joined the rebranded First Division.
- 2018–19 season: Finished 13th and were relegated back to the Second Division.
- 2022–23 season: Finished Second-to-last and were relegated to the Third Division.

== Honours ==
=== League ===
==== As Instant Dict ====
- First Division

Champions (2): 1995–96, 1997–98
Runners-up (3): 1993–94, 1996–97, 2000–01

=== Cup Competitions ===
- Hong Kong FA Cup

Champions (4): 1988–89 (as Lai Sun Double Flower), 1996–97, 1997–98, 2000–01 (all as Instant Dict)
Runners-up (2): 1991–92, 1998–99 (all as Instant Dict)

- Viceroy Cup

Champions (2): 1988–89 (as Lai Sun Double Flower), 1995–96(as Instant Dict)
Runners-up (3): 1993–94, 1994–95, 1997–98(all as Instant Dict)

- Hong Kong FA Cup Junior Division

Runners-up (2): 2016–17, 2017–18

== Continental record ==
Season	Competition	Round	Club	Home	Away	Aggregate
1994/95	Asian Cup Winners' Cup	First round	bye			
1994/95	Asian Cup Winners' Cup	Second round	(Sri Lanka) Renown SC	0–2	4–0	6–0
1994/95	Asian Cup Winners' Cup	Quarter final	(Japan) Yokohama Flügels	2–1	3–1	3–4
1996/97	Asian Club Championship	First round	(China) Shanghai Shenhua	7–1	2–1	2–9
1997/98	Asian Cup Winners' Cup	First round	Singapore Armed Forces FC	2–3	3–1	3–6
1998/99	Asian Club Championship	First round	(Japan) Júbilo Iwata	0–3	4–0	0–7
