= List of Hong Kong football champions =

- Founded: 1908
- Country: Hong Kong
- Confederation: AFC
- Current champions: Kitchee (13th title) (2025–26)
- Most championships: South China (41 titles)
- Current: 2026–27 Hong Kong Premier League

The Hong Kong football champions are the winners of the Hong Kong Premier League and Hong Kong First Division League, which is the oldest top-flight league system in Asia.

South China is the most successful club in Hong Kong. The club has won 41 league titles until 2012–13 season.

A defunct club, Seiko, are the record holders of winning longest consecutive titles. Between 1978–79 and 1984–85 they had won 7 league titles.

== List ==
=== Hong Kong First Division League era (1908–2014) ===
Edition	Season	Champions (number of titles)	Runners-up	Third place	Leading goalscorer	Goals
1	1908–09	Buffs (1)	R.G.A.	Royal Engineers	(Unknown)	
2	1909–10	R.G.A. (1)	Buffs	(Unknown)	Taylor (Buffs)	20
3	1910–11	Buffs (2)	(Unknown)	(Unknown)	(Unknown)	
4	1911–12	King's Own Rifiles (1)	(Unknown)	(Unknown)	(Unknown)	
5	1912–13	R.G.A. (2)	(Unknown)	(Unknown)	(Unknown)	
6	1913–14	D.C.L.I. (1)	Royal Engineers	R.G.A.	(Unknown)	
7	1914–15	R.G.A. (3)	(Unknown)	(Unknown)	(Unknown)	
8	1915–16	R.G.A. (4)	(Unknown)	(Unknown)	(Unknown)	
9	1916–17	Royal Engineers (1)	(Unknown)	(Unknown)	(Unknown)	
10	1917–18	R.G.A. (5)	(Unknown)	(Unknown)	(Unknown)	
11	1918–19	Royal Navy (1)	Hong Kong FC	R.G.A.	(Unknown)	
12	1919–20	Hong Kong FC (1)	(Unknown)	(Unknown)	(Unknown)	
13	1920–21	Wiltshire Regiment (1)	R.G.A.	(Unknown)	(Unknown)	
14	1921–22	HMS Curiew (1)	Hong Kong FC	(Unknown)	(Unknown)	
15	1922–23	King's Own Rifiles (2)	HMS Ambrose	(Unknown)	(Unknown)	
16	1923–24	South China (1)	East Surrey Regiment	HMS Titania	(Unknown)	
17	1924–25	East Surrey Regiment (1)	South China	Hong Kong FC	(Unknown)	
18	1925–26	Kowloon FC (1)	East Surrey Regiment	Hong Kong FC	(Unknown)	
19	1926–27	Recreio (1)	C.A.A.	Police	(Unknown)	
20	1927–28	C.A.A. (1)	(Unknown)	(Unknown)	(Unknown)	
21	1928–29	C.A.A. (2)	Somerset Regiment	(Unknown)	(Unknown)	
22	1929–30	C.A.A. (3)	Royal Navy	Somerset Regiment	(Unknown)	
23	1930–31	South China (2)	Kowloon FC	Argylis	(Unknown)	
24	1931–32	South Welsh Borderers (1)	(Unknown)	(Unknown)	(Unknown)	
25	1932–33	South China (3)	South Welsh Borderers	Royal Artillery	(Unknown)	
26	1933–34	South Welsh Borderers (2)	St. Joseph's	Lincoleshire Regiment	(Unknown)	
27	1934–35	South China (4)	Police	Recreio	(Unknown)	
28	1935–36	South China (5)	C.A.A.	Royal Welsh Fusiliers	(Unknown)	
29	1936–37	Ulster Guards (1)	South China	South China B	(Unknown)	
30	1937–38	South China B (6)	Middlesex Regiment	South China	(Unknown)	
31	1938–39	South China (7)	(Unknown)	(Unknown)	(Unknown)	
32	1939–40	South China (8)	Eastern	South China B	(Unknown)	
33	1940–41	South China A (9)	(Unknown)	(Unknown)	(Unknown)	
34	1941–42	Season unfinished due to World War II				
	1942–43	Postponed due to World War II				
	1943–44	Postponed due to World War II				
	1944–45	Postponed due to World War II				
35	1945–46	Royal Air Force (1)	44 Commando	Eastern	(Taiwan) Lai Shiu Wing (Eastern)	13
36	1946–47	Sing Tao (1)	South China	42 Commando	(Taiwan) Lai Shiu Wing (Sing Tao)	34
37	1947–48	Kitchee (1)	Sing Tao	K.M.B.	Kwok Ying Kee (Kitchee)	38
38	1948–49	South China A (10)	K.M.B.	C.A.A.	Tang Yee Kit (K.M.B.)	26
39	1949–50	Kitchee (2)	K.M.B.	St. Joseph's	Yiu Cheuk Yin (Kitchee)	25
40	1950–51	South China (11)	K.M.B.	Army Force	Au Chi Yin (Police)	20
41	1951–52	South China (12)	Army Force	Sing Tao	陳家壽 (South China)	25
42	1952–53	South China (13)	Kitchee	Eastern	Lee Yuk Tak (South China)	36
43	1953–54	K.M.B. (1)	South China	Kitchee	Tang Yee Kit (K.M.B.)	26
44	1954–55	South China (14)	Kitchee	K.M.B.	Lee Yuk Tak (South China)	32
45	1955–56	Eastern (1)	South China	K.M.B.	Ho Cheung Yau (South China)	38
46	1956–57	South China (15)	Kitchee	K.M.B.	Lee Yuk Tak (South China)	33
47	1957–58	South China (16)	K.M.B.	Kitchee	Ho Cheung Yau (South China)	40
48	1958–59	South China (17)	K.M.B.	Tung Wah	(Hong Kong) 麥永雄 (Police)	27
49	1959–60	South China (18)	Happy Valley	Tung Wah	(Hong Kong) Lau Chi Lam (Kitchee)	25
50	1960–61	South China (19)	Happy Valley	Tung Wah	(Hong Kong) 郭滿華 (Happy Valley)	27
51	1961–62	South China (20)	Happy Valley	Sing Tao	(Hong Kong) Lau Chi Lam (Happy Valley)	32
52	1962–63	Yuen Long (1)	Tung Wah	Kitchee	(Hong Kong) 郭滿華 (Happy Valley)	26
53	1963–64	Kitchee (3)	Happy Valley	South China	(Hong Kong) Cheung Chi Doy (Kitchee)	42
54	1964–65	Happy Valley (1)	South China	Sing Tao	(Hong Kong) 袁權滔 (Tung Wah) 郭滿華 (Happy Valley)	19
55	1965–66	South China (21)	Happy Valley	Sing Tao	(Hong Kong) (Hong Kong) 郭滿華 (Happy Valley)	21
56	1966–67	K.M.B. (2)	South China	Sing Tao	(Hong Kong) 袁權滔 (Tung Sing)	21
57	1967–68	South China (22)	Sing Tao	Eastern	郭滿華 (Eastern)	33
58	1968–69	South China (23)	Sing Tao	Jardines	(Hong Kong) 陳朝基 (South China)	17
59	1969–70	Jardines (1)	Sing Tao	Yuen Long	(Taiwan) Cheung Chi Doy (Jardines) 郭滿華 (Eastern)	18
60	1970–71	Rangers (1)	Jardines	Sing Tao	(Scotland) Derek Currie (Rangers)	24
61	1971–72	South China (24)	Caroline Hill	Fire Services	(Hong Kong) 袁權滔 (Eastern)	26
62	1972–73	Seiko (1)	South China	Tung Sing	(Hong Kong) Wu Kwok Hung (Seiko) (Taiwan) Cheung Chi Wai (Fire Services)	25
63	1973–74	South China (25)	Seiko	Caroline Hill	(Hong Kong) Chung Chor Hung (Happy Valley)	22
64	1974–75	Seiko (2)	Happy Valley	Rangers	Etti (Seiko)	21
65	1975–76	South China (26)	Seiko	Rangers	(Hong Kong) Chung Chor Hung (Happy Valley)	16
66	1976–77	South China (27)	Seiko	Happy Valley	(Hong Kong) Fung Chi Ming (South China)	15
67	1977–78	South China (28)	Happy Valley	Tung Sing	(Hong Kong) Fung Chi Ming (South China)	19
68	1978–79	Seiko (3)	Happy Valley	Eastern	(Hong Kong) Chung Chor Hung (Happy Valley)	22
69	1979–80	Seiko (4)	Happy Valley	Bulova	(Hong Kong) 張家平 (Tung Sing)	18
70	1980–81	Seiko (5)	South China	Happy Valley	(Hong Kong) 張家平 (Tung Sing)	14
71	1981–82	Seiko (6)	Happy Valley	Bulova	(Netherlands) Cees Storm (Seiko)	12
72	1982–83	Seiko (7)	Bulova	Eastern	(Scotland) Derek Parlane (Bulova) (England) Clive Haywood (Bulova) 史賓斯 (Rangers) 拉南 (Ryoden)	8
73	1983–84	Seiko (8)	Bulova	Happy Valley	(England) Peter Bodak (Seiko)	10
74	1984–85	Seiko (9)	South China	Sea Bee	(South Africa) John Paskin (South China)	10
75	1985–86	South China (29)	Happy Valley	Sea Bee	麥當奴 (Happy Valley) 波能泰 (Sea Bee)	11
76	1986–87	South China (30)	Eastern	Happy Valley	(Hong Kong) Tim Bredbury (South China)	10
77	1987–88	South China (31)	Happy Valley	Sing Tao	(Hong Kong) Chan Fat Chi (South China)	13
78	1988–89	Happy Valley (2)	South China	Lai Sun Double Flower	(Hong Kong) Chan Fat Chi (South China)	18
79	1989–90	South China (32)	Eastern	Happy Valley	(England) Dale Tempest (South China)	15
80	1990–91	South China (33)	Happy Valley	Lai Sun	(Hong Kong) Tim Bredbury (Lai Sun) (England) Dale Tempest (South China)	16
81	1991–92	South China (34)	Eastern	Happy Valley	(England) Steve Neville (South China)	21
82	1992–93	Eastern (2)	South China	Instant-Dict	(England) Dale Tempest (Eastern)	15
83	1993–94	Eastern (3)	Instant-Dict	South China	(England) Dale Tempest (Eastern)	16
84	1994–95	Eastern (4)	South China	Golden	(England) Dale Tempest (Eastern)	18
85	1995–96	Instant-Dict (1)	South China	Golden	(Australia) Paul Foster (Instant-Dict)	19
86	1996–97	South China (35)	Instant–Dict	Golden	(Australia) Paul Foster (Instant-Dict)	18
87	1997–98	Instant-Dict (2)	South China	Happy Valley	(Australia) Paul Foster (Instant-Dict)	16
88	1998–99	Happy Valley (3)	South China	Yee Hope	(Brazil) Tomy (Sai Kung Friends)	16
89	1999–2000	South China (36)	Sun Hei	Happy Valley	(Brazil) Leandro (Sai Kung)	16
90	2000–01	Happy Valley (4)	Instant-Dict	South China	(Scotland) Paul Ritchie (Happy Valley)	13
91	2001–02	Sun Hei (1)	Happy Valley	South China	(Nigeria) Cornelius Udebuluzor (Rangers) (Saint Kitts and Nevis) Keith Gumbs (Happy Valley)	12
92	2002–03	Happy Valley (5)	Sun Hei	Rangers	(Saint Kitts and Nevis) Keith Gumbs (Happy Valley)	17
93	2003–04	Sun Hei (2)	Kitchee	Happy Valley	(Cameroon) Julius Akosah (Sun Hei)	12
94	2004–05	Sun Hei (3)	Happy Valley	Kitchee	(Brazil) Ernestina (Happy Valley)	14
95	2005–06	Happy Valley (6)	Sun Hei	Rangers	(Brazil) Fábio Lopes Alcântara (Happy Valley) (Brazil) Ernestina (Happy Valley)	10
96	2006–07	South China (37)	Kitchee	Sun Hei	(Brazil) Tales Schutz (South China)	17
97	2007–08	South China (38)	Citizen	Tai Po	(Brazil) Detinho (South China)	19
98	2008–09	South China (39)	Kitchee	Citizen	(Brazil) Detinho (South China) (Brazil) Giovane (Sun Hei)	18
99	2009–10	South China (40)	Pegasus	Kitchee	(Brazil) Cahê (Sun Hei)	14
100	2010–11	Kitchee (4)	South China	Pegasus	(Spain) Jordi Tarrés (Kitchee) (South Africa) Makhosonke Bhengu (Rangers)	12
101	2011–12	Kitchee (5)	Pegasus	South China	(Brazil) Sandro (Rangers)	12
102	2012–13	South China (41)	Kitchee	Tuen Mun	(Hong Kong) Jaimes McKee (Pegasus)	16
103	2013–14	Kitchee (6)	Pegasus	South China	(Bosnia and Herzegovina) Admir Raščić (Pegasus)	14

=== Hong Kong Premier League era (2014–Present) ===
	Year	Champions (number of titles)	Runners-up	Third place	Leading goalscorer	Goals
1	2014–15	Kitchee (7)	Eastern	Pegasus	(Brazil) Giovane (Eastern)	17
2	2015–16	Eastern (5)	Kitchee	South China	(Montenegro) Admir Adrović (Hong Kong Pegasus) (Brazil) Giovane (Eastern)	10
3	2016–17	Kitchee (8)	Eastern	Southern	(Hong Kong) Sandro (Kitchee)	21
4	2017–18	Kitchee (9)	Tai Po	Pegasus	(Brazil) Lucas Silva (Kitchee)	15
5	2018–19	Tai Po (1)	R&F	Southern	(Spain) Manolo Bleda (Eastern) (Brazil) Lucas Silva (Kitchee)	12
6	2019–20	Kitchee (10)	Eastern	R&F	(Ivory Coast) Serges Déblé (R&F) (Brazil) Igor Sartori (R&F)	6
7	2020–21	Kitchee (11)	Eastern	Lee Man	(Montenegro) Dejan Damjanović (Kitchee)	17
8	2021–22	Abandoned due to COVID-19 pandemic in Hong Kong				
9	2022–23	Kitchee (12)	Lee Man	Rangers	(Brazil) Everton Camargo (Lee Man) (Montenegro) Dejan Damjanović (Kitchee) (Turkmenistan) Ruslan Mingazov (Kitchee)	17
10	2023–24	Lee Man (1)	Tai Po	Eastern	(Estonia) Henri Anier (Lee Man) (Spain) Noah Baffoe (Eastern)	17
11	2024–25	Tai Po (2)	Lee Man	Eastern	(Spain) Noah Baffoe (Eastern)	21
12	2025–26	Kitchee (13)	Tai Po	Lee Man	(Japan) Yu Okubo (Eastern)	18

== Performances ==
There are 30 clubs who have won the Hong Kong title.

Bold indicates clubs currently playing in the top division. Italic indicates clubs which are defunct.

=== Club ===
Club	Winners	Runners-up	Winning seasons
South China ⭐⭐⭐⭐	41	17	1923–24, 1930–31, 1932–33, 1934–35, 1935–36, 1937–38, 1938–39, 1939–40, 1940–41, 1948–49, 1950–51, 1951–52, 1952–53, 1954–55, 1956–57, 1957–58, 1958–59, 1959–60, 1960–61, 1961–62, 1965–66, 1967–68, 1968–69, 1971–72, 1973–74, 1975–76, 1976–77, 1977–78, 1985–86, 1986–87, 1987–88, 1989–90, 1990–91, 1991–92, 1996–97, 1999–2000, 2006–07, 2007–08, 2008–09, 2009–10, 2012–13
**Kitchee** ⭐	13	8	1947–48, 1949–50, 1963–64, 2010–11, 2011–12, 2013–14, 2014–15, 2016–17, 2017–18, 2019–20, 2020–21, 2022–23, 2025–26
Seiko	9	3	1972–73, 1974–75, 1978–79, 1979–80, 1980–81, 1981–82, 1982–83, 1983–84, 1984–85
Happy Valley	6	15	1964–65, 1988–89, 1998–99, 2000–01, 2002–03, 2005–06
**Eastern**	5	8	1955–56, 1992–93, 1993–94, 1994–95, 2015–16
Royal Garrison Artillery	5	2	1909–10, 1912–13, 1914–15, 1915–16, 1917–18
Sun Hei	3	3	2001–02, 2003–04, 2004–05
Chinese A. A.	3	2	1927–28, 1928–29, 1929–30
Kowloon Motor Bus	2	5	1953–54, 1966–67
Double Flower (Instant-Dict)	2	3	1995–96, 1997–98
**Tai Po**	2	3	2018–19, 2024–25
Buffs	2	1	1908–09, 1910–11
South Welsh Borderers	2	1	1931–32, 1933–34
King's Own Rifiles	2	–	1911–12, 1922–23
Sing Tao	1	4	1946–47
East Surrey Regiment	1	2	1924–25
Royal Engineers	1	1	1916–17
Royal Navy	1	1	1918–19
**HKFC**	1	1	1919–20
Kowloon FC	1	1	1925–26
Jardines	1	1	1969–70
**Lee Man**	1	1	2023–24
Duke of Cornwall's Light Infantry	1	–	1913–14
Wiltshire Regiment	1	–	1920–21
HMS Curiew	1	–	1921–22
Recreio	1	–	1926–27
Ulster Guards	1	–	1936–37
Royal Air Force	1	–	1945–46
Yuen Long	1	–	1962–63
**Rangers**	1	–	1970–71
Pegasus	–	3	–
Bulova	–	2	–
HMS Ambrose	–	1	–
Somerset Light Infantry Regiment	–	1	–
St. Joseph's	–	1	–
Police	–	1	–
Middlesex Regiment	–	1	–
44 Commando	–	1	–
Army Force	–	1	–
Tung Wah	–	1	–
Caroline Hill	–	1	–
Citizen	–	1	–
R&F	–	1	–

=== Current Club ===
Club	Winners	Runners-up	Winning seasons
South China	41	17	1923–24, 1930–31, 1932–33, 1934–35, 1935–36, 1937–38, 1938–39, 1939–40, 1940–41, 1948–49, 1950–51, 1951–52, 1952–53, 1954–55, 1956–57, 1957–58, 1958–59, 1959–60, 1960–61, 1961–62, 1965–66, 1967–68, 1968–69, 1971–72, 1973–74, 1975–76, 1976–77, 1977–78, 1985–86, 1986–87, 1987–88, 1989–90, 1990–91, 1991–92, 1996–97, 1999–2000, 2006–07, 2007–08, 2008–09, 2009–10, 2012–13
**Kitchee**	13	8	1947–48, 1949–50, 1963–64, 2010–11, 2011–12, 2013–14, 2014–15, 2016–17, 2017–18, 2019–20, 2020–21, 2022–23, 2025–26
Happy Valley	6	15	1964–65, 1988–89, 1998–99, 2000–01, 2002–03, 2005–06
**Eastern**	5	8	1955–56, 1992–93, 1993–94, 1994–95, 2015–16
Sun Hei	3	3	2001–02, 2003–04, 2004–05
Double Flower (Instant-Dict)	2	3	1995–96, 1997–98
**Tai Po**	2	2	2018–19, 2024–25
**HKFC**	1	1	1919–20
**Lee Man**	1	1	2023–24
Yuen Long	1	–	1962–63
**Rangers**	1	–	1970–71
Pegasus	–	3	–
Citizen	–	1	–

== Multiple trophy wins ==
See The Double and The Treble.

== Sources ==
- RSSSF.com
- hkgfootball.com
