= List of South China AA seasons =

This is a list of seasons played by the football teams of South China Athletic Association in Hong Kong and Asian football, from 1916 (when South China first took part in the Hong Kong Football League) to the present day. It details the club's achievements in major competitions, and the top scorers for each season.

Season	League										Senior Shield	Viceroy Cup	FA Cup	Asia	Top scorer	
Season	Division		Pos	P	W	D	L	GS	GA	Pts	Senior Shield	Viceroy Cup	FA Cup	Asia	Top scorer	
1991–92	Div 1		1st	18	15	1	2	65	13	46	Semi-finals	Runners-up	?			
1992–93	Div 1		2nd	18	10	4	4	38	18	34	Runners-up	Winners	?			
1993–94	Div 1		3rd	18	8	6	4	30	17	30	?	Winners	?			
1994–95	Div 1		2nd	18	11	4	3	35	14	37	?	?	?			
1995–96	D1	1st phase	1st	9	7	2	0	31	7	23	Winners	Runners-up	Winners			
1995–96	D1	2nd phase	2nd	9	6	2	1	18	7	20	Winners	Runners-up	Winners			
1995–96	D1	Final	2nd	Instant-Dict; 1–0; South China							Winners	Runners-up	Winners			
1996–97	D1	1st phase	2nd	12	10	1	1	32	16	31	Winners	First round	First round	Cup Winners' Cup; Quarter-finals		
1996–97	D1	2nd phase	1st	12	9	3	0	33	9	30	Winners	First round	First round	Cup Winners' Cup; Quarter-finals		
1996–97	D1	Final	1st	South China; 3–2 (asdet); Instant-Dict							Winners	First round	First round	Cup Winners' Cup; Quarter-finals		
1997–98	D1	1st stage	4th	14	8	2	4	30	25	26	First round	Winners	Runners-up	Club Championship; Round 2		
1997–98	D1	Playoff	2nd	6	4	1	1	32	27	26	First round	Winners	Runners-up	Club Championship; Round 2		
1998–99	D1	1st stage	2nd	14	6	4	4	24	15	22	Winners	—	Winners			
1998–99	D1	Playoff	1st	6	4	2	0	19	11	25	Winners	—	Winners			
1998–99	D1	Final	2nd	Happy Valley; 1–1 (aet, 8–7 pen); South China							Winners	—	Winners			
1999–2000	D1	1st stage	2nd	14	9	2	3	35	13	29	Winners	—	Semi-finals	Cup Winners' Cup; Quarter-finals		
1999–2000	D1	Playoff	1st	6	4	1	1	33	12	27.5	Winners	—	Semi-finals	Cup Winners' Cup; Quarter-finals		
1999–2000	D1	Final	1st	South China; 2–2 (aet, 4–3 pen); Happy Valley							Winners	—	Semi-finals	Cup Winners' Cup; Quarter-finals		
Season	League										Senior Shield	League Cup	FA Cup	Asia	Top scorer	
2000–01	D1	1st stage	3rd	14	8	4	2	27	20	28	Semi-finals	4th	Runners-up	Club Championship; Round 2		
2000–01	D1	Playoff	3rd	6	2	1	3	21	17	21	Semi-finals	4th	Runners-up	Club Championship; Round 2		
2001–02	Div 1		3rd	12	7	3	2	27	18	24	Winners	Winners	Runners-up	Cup Winners' Cup; Round 2		
2002–03	Div 1		4th	14	7	3	4	28	17	24	Winners	Semi-finals	Semi-finals	Champions League; Qual. East-R3		
2003–04	Div 1		7th	18	5	5	8	21	28	20	Semi-finals	Group stage	Quarter-finals			
2004–05	Div 1		6th	16	4	4	8	21	33	16	Quarter-finals	Group stage	Quarter-finals			
2005–06	Div 1		7th	14	3	4	7	18	22	13	First round	Group stage	Semi-finals		Au Wai Lun	10
2006–07	Div 1		1st	18	13	3	2	47	18	42	Winners	Semi-finals	Winners		Tales Schütz	24
2007–08	Div 1		1st	18	11	3	4	51	17	36	Semi-finals	Winners	Semi-finals		Detinho	30
2007–08	Div 1		1st	18	11	3	4	51	17	36	Semi-finals	Winners	Semi-finals	AFC Cup; Group stage	Detinho	30
2008–09	Div 1		1st	24	19	4	1	73	11	61	Semi-finals	Quarter-finals		AFC Cup; Group stage		
2008–09	Div 1		1st	24	19	4	1	73	11	61	Semi-finals	Quarter-finals		AFC Cup; Semi-Finalist		
