= Ho Cheng Yau =

Hong Kong footballer (1933–2016)

Personal information
- Date of birth: 1933
- Place of birth: British Hong Kong
- Date of death: 2016 (aged 82–83)

Senior career*
Years	Team	Apps	(Gls)
1951–1955	Sing Tao		
1955–1970	South China		

International career
1950s–1960s	Hong Kong		
Medal record
Men's football
Representing Hong Kong
AFC Asian Cup
Third place	1956 Hong Kong
- * Club domestic league appearances and goals

Ho Cheng Yau (Chinese: 何祥友; 1933–2016) was a Hong Kong professional footballer. He represented Hong Kong in 1950s to 1960s. Ho represented Hong Kong in 1954 and 1958 Asian Games.

Ho also represented Hong Kong Chinese in a non-FIFA recognized match against Malayan Chinese in Ho Ho Cup. The team also consisted of Ho's South China team-mate Yiu Chuk Yin and Mok Chun Wa, both Hong Kong-born Chinese footballers who represented Republic of China (Taiwan). Ho also played in 1961 Merdeka Tournament.

Ho, Mok and Yiu were collectively known as the Three Aces of South China.

== Honours ==
South China

- Hong Kong First Division: 1956–57, 1957–58, 1958–59, 1959–60, 1960–61, 1961–62, 1965–66, 1967–68, 1968–69
- Hong Kong Senior Shield: 1956–57, 1957–58, 1958–59, 1960–61, 1961–62, 1964–65
- Hong Kong Junior Shield: 1956–57, 1957–58, 1958–59, 1966–67

Hong Kong

- AFC Asian Cup: 3rd place, 1956
