= Chan Fai Hung =

Footballer (1932–2009)

Personal information
- Date of birth: 5 May 1932
- Place of birth: British Hong Kong
- Date of death: 2 October 2009 (aged 77)

International career
Years	Team	Apps	(Gls)
1960	Republic of China (Taiwan)		

Managerial career
- 1970–85: Seiko
Medal record
Men's football
Representing Taiwan
AFC Asian Cup
Third place	1960 South Korea
Asian Games
Gold medal – first place	1954 Manila
Gold medal – first place	1958 Tokyo

Chan Fai Hung (Chinese: 陳輝洪; 5 May 1932 – 2 October 2009) was a football player and coach who represented the Republic of China (Taiwan) internationally. He competed in the men's tournament at the 1960 Summer Olympics.

Chan is best known as the former head coach of Seiko, where he led the team to 27 major trophies between 1970 and 1985. He died due to illness on 2 October 2009.

== Honours ==
Seiko

- Hong Kong First League: 1972–73, 1974–75, 1978–79, 1979–80, 1980–81, 1981–82, 1982–83, 1983–84, 1984–85
- Hong Kong Senior Shield: 1972–73, 1973–74, 1975–76, 1976–77, 1978–79, 1979–80, 1980–81, 1984–85
- Hong Kong FA Cup: 1974–75, 1975–76, 1977–78, 1979–80, 1980–81
- Hong Kong Viceroy Cup: 1972–73, 1977–78, 1978–79, 1983–84, 1984–85

Republic of China

- AFC Asian Cup: 3rd place, 1960
- Asian Games: Gold medal, 1954, 1958
