= Ku Kam Fai =

Hong Kong footballer (born 1961)

顧錦輝 Ku Kam Fai
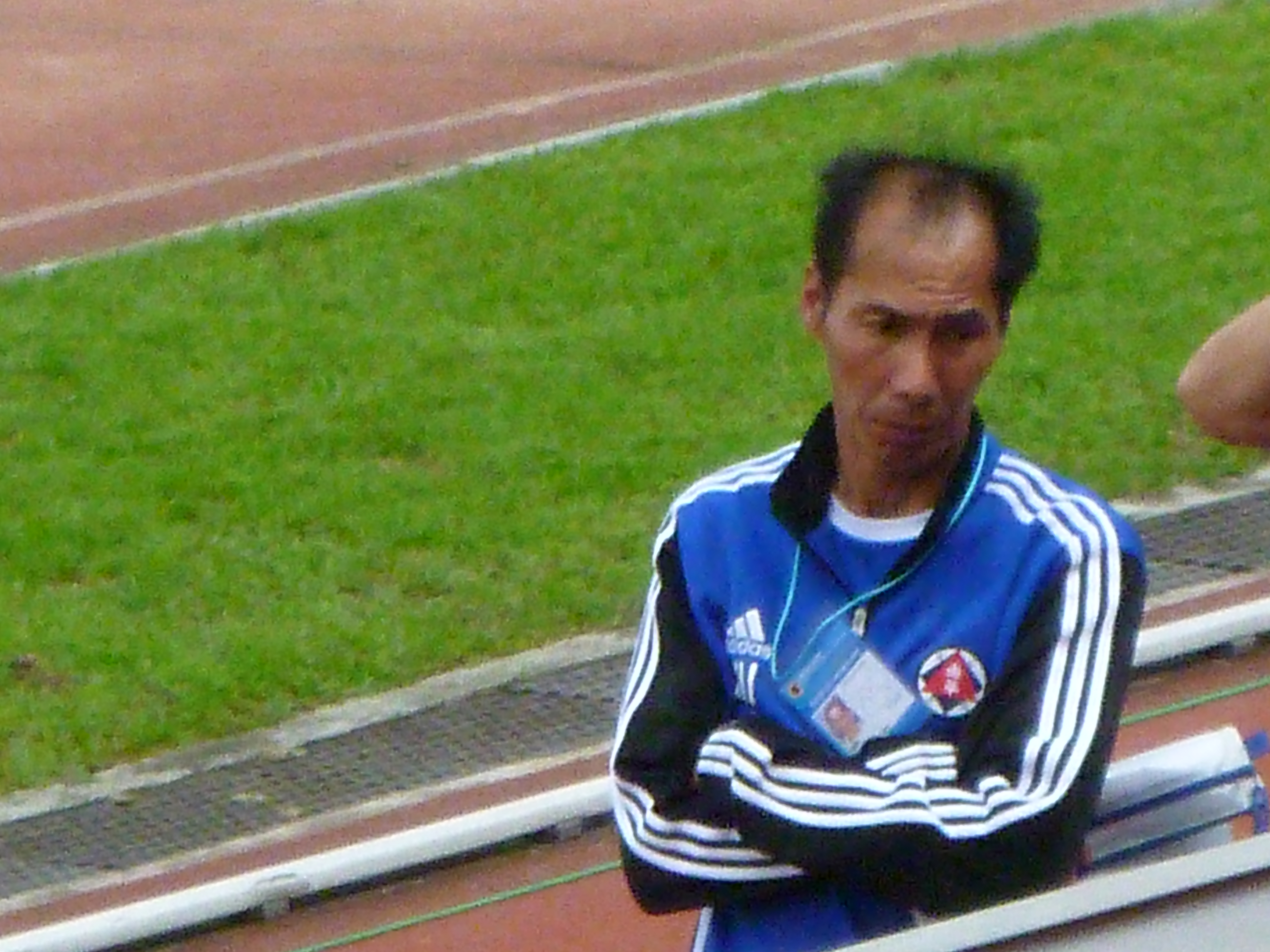
- Ku in 2012

Personal information
- Date of birth: 27 January 1961 (age 65)
- Place of birth: British Hong Kong
- Height: 1.81 m (5 ft 11 in)
- Positions: Defender; sweeper

Senior career*
Years	Team	Apps	(Gls)
1980–1983	Tsuen Wan	212	(1)
1983–1984	Eastern Sports Club	111	(2)
1984–1997	South China AA	356	(20)
Total		679	(23)

International career
1983–1998	Hong Kong	45	(5)

Managerial career
- 1997–: South China AA (assistant)
- 2016–: Wan Chai
- * Club domestic league appearances and goals

Ku Kam Fai (Chinese: 顧錦輝; Jyutping: gu^{3} gam^{2} fai^{1}; born 27 January 1961) is a Hong Kong former professional footballer and the current head coach of South China. His nickname is Muk Tsui Fai (木嘴輝).

He is widely regarded as one of the best defenders and sweepers in Hong Kong football history. He served for 13 years in the South China Athletic Association, which lasted for most of his career.

== Honours ==
- Hong Kong First Division

1985–86, 1986–87, 1987–88, 1989–90, 1990–91, 1991–92, 1996–97

- Hong Kong Senior Shield

1985–86, 1987–88, 1988–89, 1990–91, 1995–96, 1996–97

- Hong Kong FA Cup

1984–85, 1986–87, 1987–88, 1989–90, 1990–91, 1995–96

- Hong Kong Viceroy Cup

1986–87, 1987–88, 1990–91, 1992–93, 1993–94

== 5.19 World Cup qualification victory ==
Ku Kam Fai was one of the members in the famous "5.19" match, when Hong Kong historically beat China by 2–1 in the 1986 FIFA World Cup Qualifying Round on 19 May 1985. Moreover, he is the one who scored the winning goal for Hong Kong in the match.

== Today ==
On 23 February 2007, he was invited to represent SCAA 92/93 Invitation Team to play against SCAA Elite Youth in the pre-match of the exhibition competition BMA Cup organised by South China.
