= Wong Kam Fook =

Malaysian footballer

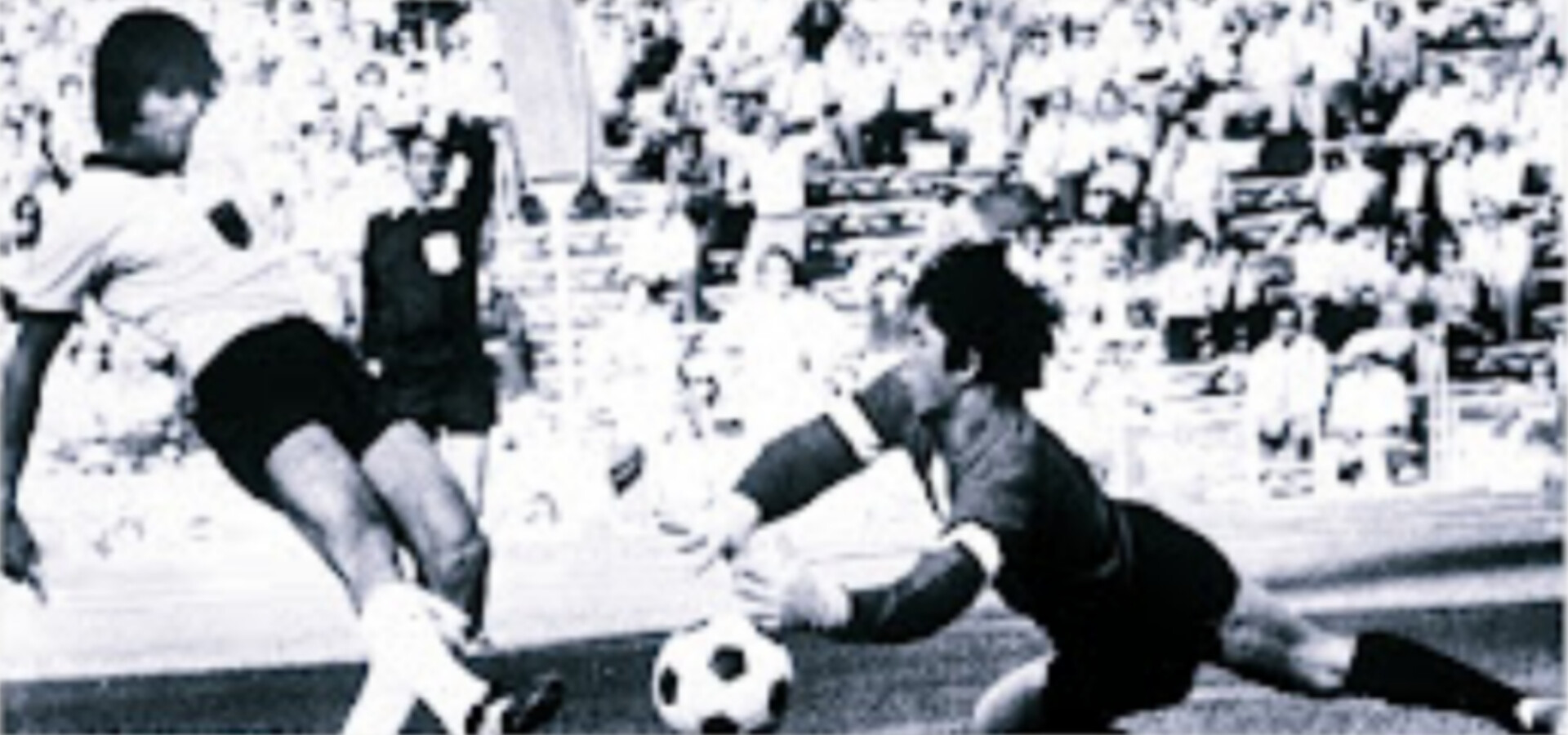
- Wong (right) in action during a match against West Germany in the 1972 Summer Olympics at Munich on 27 August 1972.

Personal information
- Date of birth: 17 March 1949 (age 77)
- Place of birth: British Malaya
- Position: Goalkeeper

Senior career*
Years	Team	Apps	(Gls)
1970–1972	Perak		
1972–1974	Caroline Hill		
1974–1976	South China		
1976–1979	Hong Kong Rangers		
1979–1980	Bulova		
1980–1981	Sea Bee		
1981–1983	Seiko		

International career
1970–1974	Malaysia		
- * Club domestic league appearances and goals

Wong Kam Fook

Chinese name
- Traditional Chinese: 黃金福
- Jyutping: Wong4 Gam1 Fuk1
- Hokkien POJ: N̂g Kim-hok
- Tâi-lô: N̂g Kim-hok

Wong Kam Fook (Chinese: 黃金福, born 17 March 1949) is a former Malaysian football goalkeeper.

== Career ==
Wong played for Perak FA in Malaysia Cup tournament until 1972, winning the 1970 Malaysia Cup. He also played for the Malaysia national football team, and was in the team that qualified to the 1972 Munich Olympics football competition. In the finals, Wong played all three group games.

After the tournament, Wong migrated to Hong Kong, turning professional and playing for Seiko, Rangers, South China and Caroline Hill, spanning from 1972 until 1984.

In 2004, he was inducted in Olympic Council of Malaysia's Hall of Fame for 1972 Summer Olympics football team.

== Personal life ==
Wong resides in Hong Kong after his playing career ended. His son, Oscar Wong Tse Yang, also plays football as a goalkeeper, and has played professionally for teams in Hong Kong and Malaysia.

== Honours ==
Perak

- Malaysia Cup: 1970

South China

- Hong Kong First Division League: 1975–76

Seiko

- Hong Kong First Division League: 1981–82, 1982–83

Malaysia

- Asian Games: Bronze medal 1974
