= Chow Chee Keong =

Malaysian footballer (1948–2018)

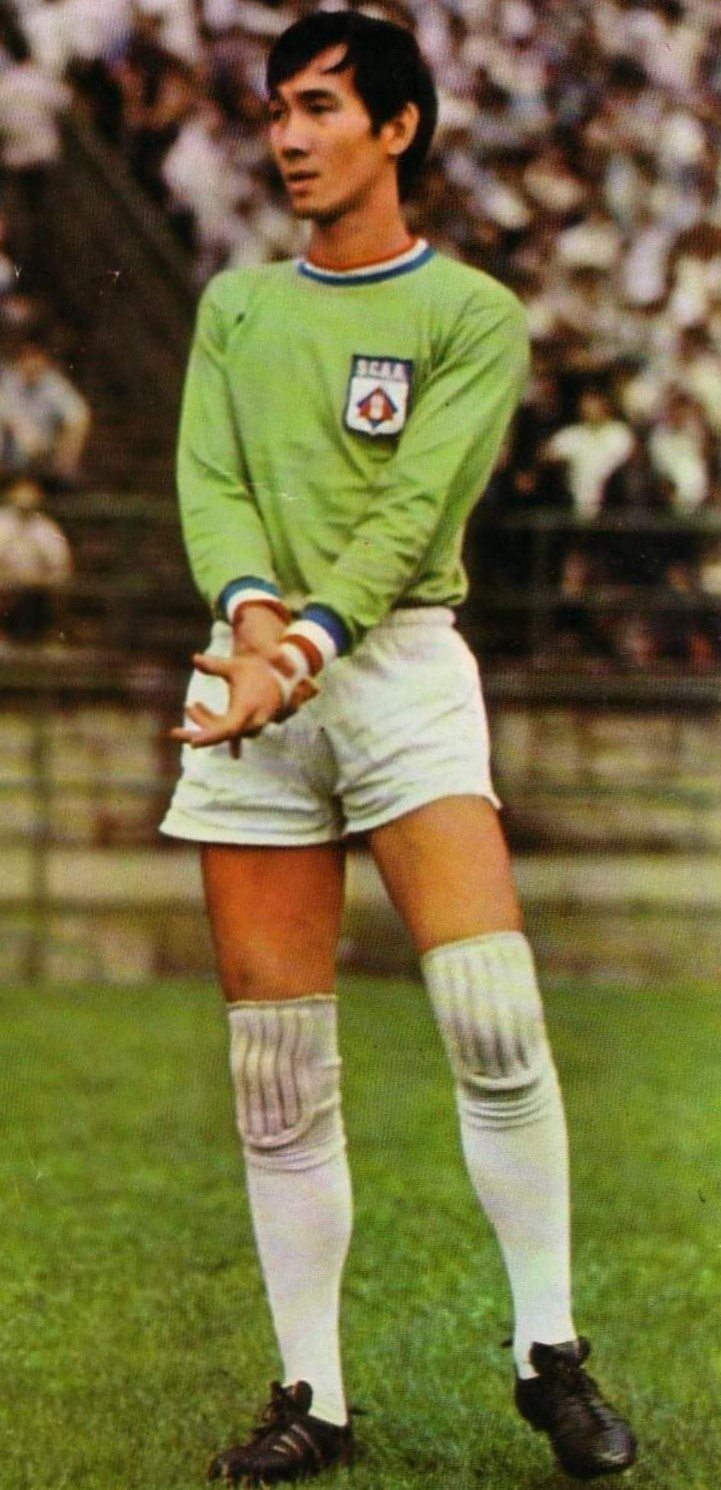
- Chee Keong playing for South China

Personal information
- Date of birth: 26 November 1948
- Place of birth: Kuala Lumpur, Malaysia
- Date of death: 21 February 2018 (aged 69)
- Height: 1.80 m (5 ft 11 in)
- Position: Goalkeeper

Senior career*
| Years | Team | Apps | (Gls) |
| 1967–1968 | Bedford Town | | (0) |
| 1970 | Hong Kong Rangers | | (0) |
| 1970–1971 | Jardine | | (0) |
| 1971–1974 | South China | | (0) |
| 1974–1977 | Tung Sing | | (0) |
| 1977–1979 | South China | | (0) |
| 1981 | South China | 0 | (0) |
| 1981–1982 | Hong Kong Rangers | 0 | (0) |

International career
| 1965–1981 | Malaysia | 38 | (0) |
Medal record
Men's football
Representing Malaysia
Merdeka Tournament
| Winner | 1968 |
Chinese name
| Traditional Chinese | 仇志強 |
| Simplified Chinese | 仇志强 |
Transcriptions Standard Mandarin: Hanyu Pinyin: Qiú Zhìqiáng; Yue: Cantonese: Jyutping: Kau4 Zi3 Koeng4
- * Club domestic league appearances and goals

Chow Chee Keong (26 November 1948 – 21 February 2018) was a Malaysian football goalkeeper who played in Hong Kong and the Malaysian national football team.

== Career ==
His nickname in Hong Kong was Asian Steel Gate (Chinese: 亞洲鋼門) and Crazy Sword (Chinese: 神經刀). He was a Malaysian Chinese. In 1963, he represented the Malaysian in under-20 level as a 13-year-old. Two years later, he joined the Malaysian national football team as a 15-year-old. At that point, he was the youngest ever Malaysian international player. He was briefly on the playing staff at Bedford Town FC. From 1966 to 1970, he was voted by the Asian Football Confederation as the best goalkeeper five times in a row.

In 1968, he came to Hong Kong with a Chinese Malaysian selection side and many Hong Kong clubs took notice of him. Two years later, he joined Hong Kong Rangers for three guest matches. Then, he joined Jardine for a salary of HK$2,500 per month which was the Hong Kong record at that time. However, a year later, Jardines withdrew from the Hong Kong football league system. So he moved to South China where his career started to take off. For his three seasons with South China, he won many trophies and personal awards. In 1974, he moved to Tung Sing. His salary was HKD 7000 per month plus housing. In 1977, he returned to South China. A year later, he started to play in both Hong Kong league and the Malaysian league simultaneously. In 1979, he left Hong Kong, but returned in 1981. He spent a short time again with South China before moving to Hong Kong Rangers. In 1980, he returned to Malaysia and played for Malaysian national football team for 1980 Pestabola Merdeka and World Cup qualification in 1981 before retiring from football.

== Retirement ==
He became a golfer after retiring from football. In 1991, he finally earned a coaching license. He first started to teach in Malaysia. In 1995, he moved to a golf club in Shenzhen, China. In 1997, he returned to South China as a golfing instructor.

== Honours ==
=== Club ===
South China

- Hong Kong First Division

Winners (3): 1971-72, 1973-74, 1977-78

- Hong Kong Senior Shield

Winners (1): 1971-72

- Viceroy Cup

Winners (1): 1971-72

=== International ===
Malaysia

- Merdeka Tournament

Winners (1): 1968

=== Individual ===
- AFC Asia's best goalkeeper: 1966, 1967, 1968, 1969, 1970
- AFC Asian All Stars: 1968
- Between The Sticks-Top 10 Asian & Oceanic goalkeepers of all time (5th place): 2020
- MasterCard Asian/Oceanian Team of the 20th Century: 1998
- IFFHS Men Best Malaysian Goalkeeper of the Century (1901-2000)
- IFFHS Men’s All Time Malaysia Dream Team: 2022
