= Cheung Chi Doy =

Hong Kong footballer

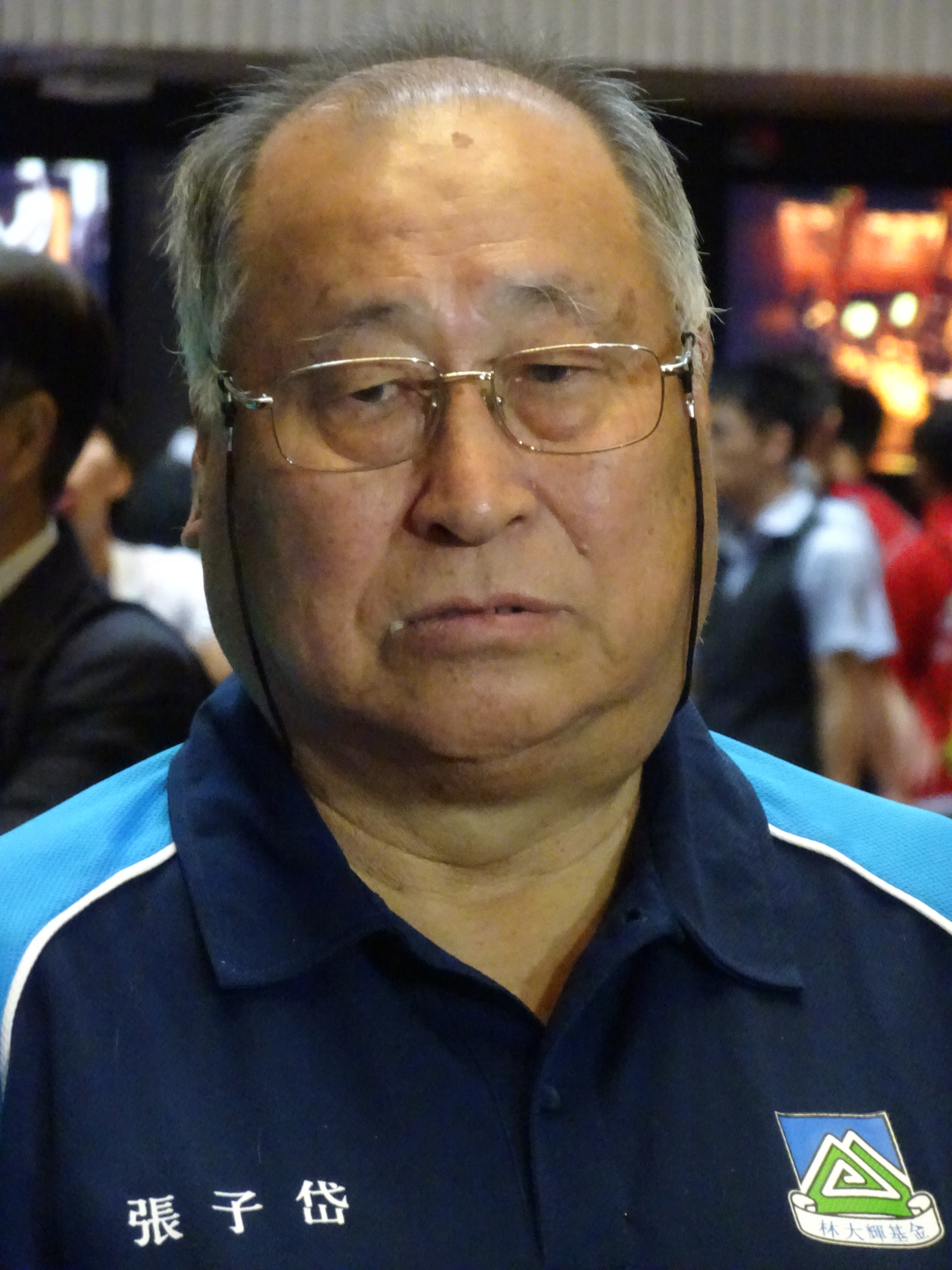

Personal information
- Full name: Cheung Chi Doy
- Date of birth: 30 July 1941 (age 85)
- Place of birth: Hong Kong
- Height: 1.74 m (5 ft 9 in)
- Position: Forward

Youth career
- 1957–1959: Sing Tao

Senior career*
Years	Team	Apps	(Gls)
1959–1960	Tung Wah	24	(13)
1960–1962	Blackpool	2	(1)
1962	Yuen Long	6	(6)
1962–1963	Kwong Wah	17	(9)
1963–1964	Kitchee	25	(16)
1964–1968	Sing Tao	102	(58)
1968	Vancouver Royals	11	(2)
1968	St. Louis Stars	8	(0)
1968–1971	Jardine	62	(30)
1971–1972	Fire Services	20	(8)
1972–1978	Happy Valley	143	(51)

International career
1962–1971	Republic of China	35	(17)

Managerial career
- 1980–1981: Bulova
- 1981–1982: Double Flower
- 1982–1983: Kuitan
- 1983–1985: Kitchee
- * Club domestic league appearances and goals

Cheung Chi Doy
- Traditional Chinese: 張子岱
- Simplified Chinese: 张子岱
Transcriptions
Standard Mandarin
- Hanyu Pinyin: Zhāng Zidài
- Wade–Giles: Chang Tzu Tai
Yue: Cantonese
- Jyutping: Jēung Jídoih

Cheung Chi Doy (or transliterated as Chang Tse Da; born 30 July 1941) is a Hong Kong former professional footballer. Started his career in native Hong Kong, in the British Empire, he also played for English side Blackpool. In international level, he represented Republic of China (aka Taiwan, now Chinese Taipei national team).

Cheung was the first Asian and Hong Kong football player to play in Europe. He began his career in the Hong Kong First Division at 14 years of age. In 1960, he went to play for English club Blackpool, where he was a teammate of Jimmy Armfield. He became the first ethnic Chinese player to appear in the top flight of English football. He made two appearances for Blackpool's first team and scored one goal, against Sheffield Wednesday on November 25, 1961. In 1968, he and his brother Cheung Chi Wai joined the Vancouver Royals, playing under Bobby Robson in the North American Soccer League. While he began the season in Vancouver, he finished it with the St. Louis Stars. He also played for Tung Wah, Kitchee and Jardine SA in the Hong Kong First Division.

Following Cheung's stint at Blackpool in 1962, he was the only Hong Kong-born football player to have played for a top-flight European club until Michael Udebuluzor signed with Estonian top-flight side Tallinna Kalev. Cheung remains the only Hongkonger to have played professional football in England.

In the 1963-64 season, he scored a record number of 42 goals playing for Kitchee SC.

== Personal life ==
Cheung Chi Doy's father, Chang King Hai (Chinese: 張金海), and brother Cheung Chi Wai were also footballers.

Cheung Chi Doy's son, Nelson Cheung Hok-yun (Chinese: 張學潤, 5 June 1963 - 18 May 2023), nicknamed Nel Nel, was an actor and fashion designer. Nelson committed suicide on 18 May 2023.

In 2011 Cheung Chi Doy was arrested for shoplifting in a supermarket. He was fined HK$2,000 by the court.

== Honours ==
Kitchee

- Hong Kong First Division League: 1963-64

Sing Tao

- Hong Kong Senior Challenge Shield: 1966-67

Individual

- Asian All Stars: 1965, 1966, 1967
- MasterCard Asian/Oceanian Team of the 20th Century: 1998
