= 1974–75 Hong Kong FA Cup =

Tournament details
- Country: Hong Kong

Final positions
- Champions: Seiko (1st title)
- Runners-up: Rangers

1974–75 Hong Kong FA Cup was the first staging of the Hong Kong FA Cup.

The competition started on 23 March 1975 with 13 Hong Kong First Division clubs and 3 other teams from Second and Third Division.

== Teams ==
- Caroline Hill
- Eastern
- Happy Valley
- Rangers
- Jardines
- Kowloon Motor Bus (From the Second Division League)
- Kui Tan (From the Third Division League)
- Kwong Wah
- Mackinnons
- Seiko
- South China
- Telephone
- Tsuen Wan (From the Second Division League)
- Tung Sing
- Urban Services
- Yuen Long

== Fixtures and results ==
All times are Hong Kong Time (UTC+8).

=== Bracket ===
First Round
Caroline Hill	2
Urban Services	0
Tsuen Wan	0
South China	2
Seiko	1
Kwong Wah	0
Happy Valley	3
Eastern	1
Kowloon Motor Bus	0
Rangers	1
Tung Sing	1
Telephone	0
Yuen Long	5
Jardines	1
Mackinnons	3
Kui Tan	0

Quarter-finals
Caroline Hill (Replay)	2	1
South China	2	4
Seiko	1
Happy Valley	0
Rangers	4
Tung Sing	1
Yuen Long (Replay)	1	2
Mackinnons	1	1

Semi-finals
South China	3	1	4
Seiko	3	2	5
Rangers	1	3	4
Yuen Long	0	0	0

Final
Seiko	0	5	5
Rangers	1	1	2

=== Final ===
==== First leg ====
1975-05-22
20:00

Seiko	0 – 1	Rangers
		Semple 85'

Government Stadium
Attendance: 23,916

==== Second leg ====
1975-05-25
17:15

Seiko	5 – 1	Rangers
Etti 21', 90'; Wu Kwok Hung 25'; Chan Hung Ping 31'; Currie 82'		Semple 72'

Government Stadium
Attendance: 27,383
