= Clive Haywood =

English footballer

Personal information
- Date of birth: 25 November 1960 (age 65)
- Place of birth: Ramsgate, Kent, England
- Position: Striker

Youth career
- 1974–1978: Coventry City
- 1976–1977: → Deal Town (loan)

Senior career*
Years	Team	Apps	(Gls)
1978–1981	Coventry City	1	(0)
1980	→ Seiko (loan)		
1981	Washington Diplomats	12	(3)
1981–1984	Bulova		
1984–1986	Thanet United	30	(6)
- * Club domestic league appearances and goals

Clive Haywood (born 1 November 1960 in Ramsgate, Kent) is an English former footballer who played in the Football League for Coventry City, for Seiko and Bulova SA in Hong Kong, in the North American Soccer League for the Washington Diplomats, and in non-League football for Thanet United.

== Football career ==
In 1975, Haywood signed on schoolboy forms with Coventry City. During the 1978–79 season, he was the top scorer for the Coventry City reserve team ahead of Mark Hateley, Garry Thompson and Gary Bannister. The following season, he had 9 goals in 24 matches. And then, he was sent on a 3-month loan along with Steve Whitton to Seiko FC in Hong Kong. After returning from Hong Kong, Haywood made his professional debut in England on 30 August 1980 against Aston Villa, but this turned out to be his only first team appearance. In 1981, Haywood was sold to Washington Diplomats in the NASL where he played alongside Johan Cruyff.

A year later, he was sold to Bulova SA in Hong Kong. His teammates included Arsenal's Charlie George and Tommy Hutchison. He was the top scorer in the Hong Kong league for the 1982–83 season with 26 goals. He returned to England in 1984 with Thanet United. He retired in 1986.
