= 1970–71 Hong Kong First Division League =

Hong Kong First Division
- Season: 1970–71
- Champions: Rangers
- Relegated: HKFC
- Matches played: 182
- Goals scored: 652 (3.58 per match)

The 1970–71 Hong Kong First Division League season was the 60th since its establishment.

== League table ==
Pos	Team	Pld	W	D	L	GF	GA	GD	Pts
1	Rangers (C)	26	17	5	4	74	36	+38	39
2	Jardines (W)	26	16	5	5	57	25	+32	37
3	Sing Tao	26	13	9	4	43	22	+21	35
4	Police	26	12	8	6	53	37	+16	32
5	Tung Sing	26	11	8	7	63	51	+12	30
6	Happy Valley	26	12	5	9	57	42	+15	29
7	South China	26	11	8	7	55	41	+14	29 (Note: 1 point deducted?)
8	Fire Services	26	9	8	9	49	45	+4	26
9	Yuen Long	26	7	8	11	47	47	0	22
10	Eastern	26	9	4	13	31	49	−18	22
11	Telephone	26	6	9	11	29	42	−13	21
12	Army	26	8	5	13	38	57	−19	21
13	KMB	26	7	7	12	37	59	−22	21
14	HKFC (R)	26	0	0	26	19	99	−80	0

Source: rsssf.com
(C) Champions; (R) Relegated; (W) Withdrew from league system after the season
