= 1947–48 Hong Kong First Division League =

Hong Kong First Division
- Season: 1947–48
- Champions: Kitchee
- Matches played: 209
- Goals scored: 978 (4.68 per match)

The 1947–48 Hong Kong First Division League season was the 37th since its establishment.

== League table ==
Pos	Team	Pld	W	D	L	GF	GA	GD	Pts
1	Kitchee (C)	28	22	2	4	98	45	+53	46
2	Sing Tao (W)	28	21	1	6	93	41	+52	43
3	KMB	28	18	4	6	89	54	+35	40
4	Chinese Athletic Association	28	17	5	6	69	42	+27	39
5	South China A	27	17	4	6	71	48	+23	38
6	Eastern	28	15	4	9	65	42	+23	34
7	St Joseph's	28	11	3	14	69	69	0	25
8	HKFC	28	9	6	13	59	60	−1	24
9	Kwong Wah	28	8	7	13	68	85	−17	23
10	Fusiliers (M)	28	9	4	15	68	85	−17	22
11	Royal Air Force	28	9	2	17	64	81	−17	20
12	Police	27	7	5	15	25	54	−29	19
13	Royal Garrison Artillery (M)	28	4	8	16	43	79	−36	16
14	Buffs (M)	28	8	0	20	56	109	−53	16
15	Royal Navy	28	4	5	19	41	84	−43	13

Source: rsssf.com
(C) Champions; (M) Merged into Army following the season; (W) Withdrew following the season
