= 1988–89 Hong Kong First Division League =

Hong Kong First Division
- Season: 1988–89
- Champions: Happy Valley
- Matches played: 135
- Goals scored: 260 (1.93 per match)

The 1988–89 Hong Kong First Division League season was the 78th since its establishment.

== League table ==
Pos	Team	Pld	W	PKW	PKL	L	GF	GA	GD	Pts
1	Happy Valley (C)	27	19	5	2	1	52	10	+42	69
2	South China	27	21	0	4	2	55	16	+39	67
3	Lai Sun Double Flower	27	14	6	3	4	37	12	+25	57
4	Sing Tao	27	6	8	3	10	17	26	−9	37
5	Tin Tin (W)	27	7	4	7	9	19	21	−2	36
6	Eastern	27	6	7	3	11	13	27	−14	35
7	Tsuen Wan (W)	27	6	3	7	11	22	34	−12	31
8	Sea Bee	27	5	4	6	12	14	30	−16	29
9	Police	27	5	4	5	13	15	34	−19	28
10	HKFC	27	1	4	5	17	16	50	−34	16

Source: rsssf.com
Rules for classification: 2 points for draw won on penalties, 1 point for draw lost on penalties
(C) Champion; (W) Withdrew from the league system after the season.
