= 1980–81 Hong Kong First Division League =

Hong Kong First Division
- Season: 1980–81
- Champions: Seiko
- Relegated: Police; HKFC
- Matches played: 110
- Goals scored: 312 (2.84 per match)

The 1980–81 Hong Kong First Division League season was the 70th since its establishment.

== League table ==
Pos	Team	Pld	W	D	L	GF	GA	GD	Pts
1	Seiko (C)	20	13	5	2	46	12	+34	31
2	South China	20	11	7	2	38	16	+22	29
3	Happy Valley	20	11	4	5	31	18	+13	26
4	Sea Bee	20	10	5	5	39	22	+17	25
5	Bulova	20	11	3	6	41	25	+16	25
6	Eastern	20	9	5	6	30	22	+8	23
7	Caroline Hill	20	7	5	8	21	25	−4	19
8	Tsuen Wan	20	4	9	7	18	27	−9	17
9	Tung Sing	20	6	4	10	24	32	−8	16
10	Police (R)	20	2	4	14	17	49	−32	8
11	HKFC (R)	20	0	1	19	7	64	−57	1

Source: rsssf.com
(C) Champions; (R) Relegated
