= 1969–70 Hong Kong First Division League =

Hong Kong First Division
- Season: 1969–70
- Champions: Jardines
- Matches played: 132
- Goals scored: 458 (3.47 per match)

The 1969–70 Hong Kong First Division League season was the 59th since its establishment.

== League table ==
Pos	Team	Pld	W	D	L	GF	GA	GD	Pts
1	Jardine (C)	22	15	5	2	70	26	+44	35
2	Sing Tao	22	12	8	2	42	17	+25	32
3	Yuen Long	22	13	4	5	40	29	+11	30
4	Fire Services	22	11	4	7	51	36	+15	26
5	Tung Sing	22	10	6	6	44	29	+15	26
6	KMB	22	7	8	7	24	34	−10	22
7	South China	22	6	8	8	40	36	+4	20
8	Telephone	22	6	6	10	33	35	−2	18
9	Eastern	22	5	8	9	29	43	−14	18
10	Police	22	6	3	13	34	51	−17	15
11	Rangers	22	4	6	12	24	40	−16	14
12	HKFC	22	3	2	17	27	82	−55	8

Source: rsssf.com
(C) Champions
