= 1913–14 Hong Kong First Division League =

Hong Kong First Division
- Season: 1913–14
- Champions: Duke of Cornwall's Light Infantry (1st title)

The 1913–14 Hong Kong First Division League season was the 6th since its establishment.

== Overview ==
Duke of Cornwall's Light Infantry won the championship.
