= 1916–17 Hong Kong First Division League =

Hong Kong First Division
- Season: 1916–17
- Champions: Royal Engineers (1st title)

The 1916–17 Hong Kong First Division League season was the 9th since its establishment.

== Overview ==
Royal Engineers won the championship.
