= 1920–21 Hong Kong First Division League =

Hong Kong First Division
- Season: 1920–21
- Champions: Wiltshire Regiment (1st title)

The 1920–21 Hong Kong First Division season was the 13th since its establishment.

== Overview ==
Wiltshire Regiment won the title.
