= 1919–20 Hong Kong First Division League =

Hong Kong First Division
- Season: 1919–20
- Champions: HKFC (1st title)

The 1919–20 Hong Kong First Division League season was the 12th since its establishment.

== Overview ==
HKFC won the title.
