= 1945–46 Hong Kong First Division League =

Hong Kong First Division
- Season: 1945–46
- Champions: Royal Air Force

The 1945–46 Hong Kong First Division League season was the 35th since its establishment. It was the first season of the league following the conclusion of the Japanese occupation of Hong Kong during World War II.

== Overview ==
Royal Air Force won the title.
