= 1910–11 Hong Kong First Division League =

Hong Kong First Division
- Season: 1910–11
- Champions: Buffs (2nd title)

The 1910–11 Hong Kong First Division League season was the third since its establishment.

== Overview ==
Buffs won the championship.
