= 1936–37 Hong Kong First Division League =

Hong Kong First Division
- Season: 1936–37
- Champions: South China A
- Matches played: 182
- Goals scored: 615 (3.38 per match)

The 1936–37 Hong Kong First Division League season was the 29th since its establishment.

== League table ==
Pos	Team	Pld	W	D	L	GF	GA	GD	Pts
1	Royal Ulster Rifles (C)	26	19	3	4	69	26	+43	41
2	South China A	26	16	5	5	64	24	+40	37
3	Seaforth Highlanders	26	15	4	7	52	42	+10	34
4	South China B	26	14	5	7	57	42	+15	33
5	Royal Welch Fusiliers	26	13	5	8	52	36	+16	31
6	Royal Navy	26	12	4	10	55	47	+8	28
7	St. Joseph's	26	12	3	11	42	39	+3	27
8	HKFC	26	12	0	14	45	26	+19	24
9	Kowloon FC	26	10	4	12	32	50	−18	24
10	Club de Recreio	26	9	5	12	39	48	−9	23
11	Eastern	26	8	4	14	45	62	−17	20
12	Chinese Athletic Association	26	6	6	14	28	48	−20	18
13	Kowloon Chinese	26	4	6	16	30	57	−27	14
14	Police	25	2	5	18	25	68	−43	9

Source: rsssf.com
(C) Champions
