= 1938–39 Hong Kong First Division League =

Hong Kong First Division
- Season: 1938–39
- Champions: South China

The 1938–39 Hong Kong First Division League season was the 31st since its establishment.

== Overview ==
South China won the title.
