= 1966–67 Hong Kong First Division League =

Hong Kong First Division
- Season: 1966–67
- Champions: KMB
- Relegated: Tung Wah; HKFC
- Matches played: 132
- Goals scored: 590 (4.47 per match)

The 1966–67 Hong Kong First Division League season was the 56th since its establishment.

== League table ==
Pos	Team	Pld	W	D	L	GF	GA	GD	Pts
1	KMB (C)	22	15	3	4	52	27	+25	33
2	South China	22	13	6	3	66	30	+36	32
3	Sing Tao	22	15	1	6	87	30	+57	31
4	Tung Sing	22	11	8	3	59	34	+25	30
5	Happy Valley (W)	22	12	3	7	51	33	+18	27
6	Police	22	10	5	7	46	34	+12	25
7	Rangers	22	9	3	10	45	55	−10	21
8	Army	22	8	4	10	45	54	−9	20
9	Yuen Long	22	6	7	9	43	54	−11	19
10	Eastern	22	5	4	13	39	82	−43	14
11	Tung Wah (R)	22	3	3	16	33	72	−39	9
12	HKFC (R)	22	1	1	20	24	85	−61	3

Source: rsssf.com
(C) Champions; (R) Relegated; (W) Withdrew following the season
