= Lai Shiu Wing =

Chinese footballer

Personal information
- Full name: Lai Shiu Wing
- Date of birth: 1917
- Place of birth: Hong Kong
- Date of death: 26 July 1988 (aged 70–71)
- Place of death: Hong Kong
- Position: Second striker

Senior career*
Years	Team	Apps	(Gls)
- Kitchee
- Eastern
- Sing Tao

International career
1948	China		
- * Club domestic league appearances and goals

Lai Shiu Wing (Chinese: 黎兆榮; Jyutping: lai^{4} siu^{6} wing^{4}, 1917 – 26 July 1988) was a Chinese professional footballer and a member of the Chinese national team. He was the head coach of Hong Kong national team.

He previously played for Hong Kong football clubs Kitchee, Eastern, Sing Tao SC and South China.
