= 1948–49 Hong Kong First Division League =

Hong Kong First Division
- Season: 1948–49
- Champions: South China A
- Matches played: 152
- Goals scored: 671 (4.41 per match)

The 1948–49 Hong Kong First Division League season was the 38th since its establishment.

== League table ==
| Pos | Team | Pld | W | D | L | GF | GA | GD | Pts |
|---|---|---|---|---|---|---|---|---|---|
| 1 | South China A (C) | 23 | 20 | 2 | 1 | 70 | 17 | +53 | 42 |
| 2 | KMB | 24 | 19 | 0 | 5 | 82 | 29 | +53 | 38 |
| 3 | Chinese Athletic Association | 24 | 16 | 4 | 4 | 52 | 28 | +24 | 36 |
| 4 | Army | 24 | 14 | 5 | 5 | 57 | 42 | +15 | 33 |
| 5 | Kitchee | 24 | 14 | 1 | 9 | 70 | 48 | +22 | 29 |
| 6 | HKFC | 23 | 10 | 2 | 11 | 60 | 49 | +11 | 22 |
| 7 | South China B (W) | 24 | 8 | 6 | 10 | 54 | 59 | −5 | 22 |
| 8 | St Joseph's | 23 | 8 | 3 | 12 | 47 | 55 | −8 | 19 |
| 9 | Eastern | 24 | 8 | 2 | 14 | 49 | 63 | −14 | 18 |
| 10 | Royal Navy | 23 | 6 | 4 | 13 | 30 | 55 | −25 | 16 |
| 11 | Police | 22 | 4 | 4 | 14 | 41 | 71 | −30 | 12 |
| 12 | Royal Air Force | 24 | 4 | 3 | 17 | 35 | 87 | −52 | 11 |
| 13 | Kwong Wah | 22 | 2 | 2 | 18 | 24 | 68 | −44 | 6 |

Source: rsssf.com
(C) Champions; (W) Withdrew following the season
