= 1915–16 Hong Kong First Division League =

Hong Kong First Division
- Season: 1915–16
- Champions: Royal Garrison Artillery (4th title)
- Relegated: Hong Kong West

The 1915–16 Hong Kong First Division League season was the 8th since its establishment.

== Overview ==
Royal Garrison Artillery won the title. Hong Kong West were relegated.
