= 1940–41 Hong Kong First Division League =

Hong Kong First Division
- Season: 1940–41
- Champions: South China

The 1940–41 Hong Kong First Division League season was the 33rd since its establishment.

== Overview ==
South China won the championship.
