= Leandro Simioni =

Brazilian footballer (born 1974)

Personal information
- Full name: Leandro Vilas Boas Simioni
- Date of birth: 29 September 1974 (age 52)
- Place of birth: São Bernardo do Campo, Brazil
- Height: 1.85 m (6 ft 1 in)
- Position: Forward

Youth career
- Nacional (SP)

Senior career*
Years	Team	Apps	(Gls)
1994–1995	Portuguesa		
1996	XV de Piracicaba		
1996–1997	Cercle Brugge	14	(0)
1997–1998	Golden		
1998–1999	Sai Kung	?	(16)
1999–2000	Yee Hope	?	(13)
2001	Yokohama F. Marinos	3	(0)
2002	Bahia		
2002	Santa Cruz		
2003	Paulista de Campo Limpo Paulista		
2003–2005	Rot-Weiß Oberhausen	43	(6)
2007	Bandeirante	0	(0)
2007–2008	Bnei Sakhnin	3	(0)
2008–2009	Hapoel Be'er Sheva	38	(13)
2010	Maccabi Ironi Bat Yam		
2010	União da Vila Sá		
- * Club domestic league appearances and goals

Leandro Vilas Boas Simioni (born 29 September 1974), also known as Leandro Testa, is a Brazilian former professional footballer. In December 2010 Simioni was involved in a car accident in Brazil, he was seriously injured and left paralyzed from the waist down.

== Biography ==
=== Early career ===
Born in São Bernardo do Campo, São Paulo state, Leandro started his career with clubs of the state before moved to Belgian side Cercle Brugge.

=== Hong Kong and Japan ===
He then moved to Hong Kong and played for Golden, Sai Kung and Yee Hope. He was the top-scorer in 1999–2000 Hong Kong First Division League. He was also selected into Hong Kong League XI for several times. In January 2001 he left Yee Hope and was offered a contract from Matsubara of Brazil, which the club was invested by Japanese. He then left for J1 League club Yokohama F. Marinos. He left the club in July.

=== Return to Brazil ===
Leandro then returned to Brazil and played for Bahia (on loan from unnamed club), Santa Cruz and Paulista de Campo Limpo Paulista. He finished as the runner-up of 2002 Campeonato Pernambucano.

=== Germany and Israel ===
In June 2003 he left for 2. Bundesliga club Rot-Weiß Oberhausen. The club relegated to Regionalliga Nord in mid–2005. In March 2007 he was signed by Bandeirante of São Paulo state, played the second half of 2007 Campeonato Paulista Série A2, scored twice.

He then left for Israeli club Bnei Sakhnin and Hapoel Be'er Sheva. On 25 January 2010, he was signed by Maccabi Ironi Bat Yam.

=== Amateur ===
On 4 November 2010, he returned to Brazil again, signing for União da Vila Sá of Campeonato Paulista Amador do Estado.

Awards and achievements
Preceded by Paul Ritchie	Hong Kong First Division League top scorer 1999–2000	Succeeded by Paul Ritchie
