= 1984–85 Hong Kong First Division League =

Hong Kong First Division
- Season: 1984–85
- Champions: Seiko
- Matches played: 72
- Goals scored: 164 (2.28 per match)

The 1984–85 Hong Kong First Division League season was the 74th since its establishment.

== League table ==
Pos	Team	Pld	W	D	L	GF	GA	GD	Pts
1	Seiko (C)	16	12	3	1	37	12	+25	27
2	South China	16	10	5	1	27	7	+20	25
3	Sea Bee	16	8	4	4	24	18	+6	20
4	Happy Valley	16	5	7	4	20	20	0	17
5	Harps	16	5	6	5	13	14	−1	16
6	Tung Sing	16	4	5	7	16	21	−5	13
7	Eastern	16	3	4	9	14	20	−6	10
8	Rangers	16	1	6	9	8	27	−19	8
9	Tsuen Wan	16	2	4	10	5	25	−20	8

Source: rsssf.com
(C) Champions
