= 1951–52 Hong Kong First Division League =

Hong Kong First Division
- Season: 1951–52
- Champions: South China
- Matches played: 156
- Goals scored: 599 (3.84 per match)

The 1951–52 Hong Kong First Division League season was the 41st since its establishment.

== League table ==
Pos	Team	Pld	W	D	L	GF	GA	GD	Pts
1	South China (C)	24	18	3	3	73	26	+47	39
2	Army	24	17	2	5	73	25	+48	36
3	Sing Tao	24	16	2	6	71	30	+41	34
4	Kitchee	24	14	5	5	44	24	+20	33
5	KMB	24	13	3	8	59	34	+25	29
6	Eastern	24	13	3	8	41	38	+3	29
7	Kwong Wah	24	11	3	10	51	47	+4	25
8	Royal Air Force	24	12	1	11	40	43	−3	25
9	Police	24	7	2	15	31	63	−32	16
10	Chinese Athletic Association	24	3	8	13	24	49	−25	14
11	HKFC	24	6	2	16	25	60	−35	14
12	St Joseph's	24	4	4	16	33	61	−28	12
13	Royal Navy	24	2	2	20	34	99	−65	6

Source: rsssf.com
(C) Champions
