= 1968–69 Hong Kong First Division League =

Hong Kong First Division
- Season: 1968–69
- Champions: South China
- Relegated: Caroline Hill; Army
- Matches played: 132
- Goals scored: 491 (3.72 per match)

The 1968–69 Hong Kong First Division League season was the 58th since its establishment.

== League table ==
Pos	Team	Pld	W	D	L	GF	GA	GD	Pts
1	South China (C)	22	17	4	1	58	20	+38	38
2	Sing Tao	22	12	9	1	56	20	+36	33
3	Jardines	22	13	6	3	51	23	+28	32
4	Yuen Long	22	10	7	5	42	32	+10	27
5	Tung Sing	22	10	5	7	39	36	+3	25
6	KMB	22	9	2	11	44	44	0	20
7	Eastern	22	5	8	9	51	56	−5	18
8	Rangers	22	6	6	10	29	41	−12	18
9	Telephone	22	6	4	12	24	38	−14	16
10	Police	22	4	8	10	28	45	−17	16
11	Caroline Hill (R)	22	3	6	13	35	65	−30	12
12	Army (R)	22	3	3	16	34	71	−37	9

Source: rsssf.com
(C) Champions; (R) Relegated
