= 1908–09 Hong Kong First Division League =

Hong Kong First Division
- Season: 1908–09
- Champions: Buffs (1st title)
- Matches: 56
- Goals: 202 (3.61 per match)

The 1908–09 Hong Kong Football League was the inaugural season of Hong Kong Football League, also recognized as the inaugural season of Hong Kong First Division.

== League table ==
Pos	Team	Pld	W	D	L	GF	GA	GD	Pts
1	Buffs (C)	14	13	1	0	57	3	+54	27
2	R.G.A.	14	10	1	3	35	12	+23	21
3	Royal Engineers	14	8	3	3	26	8	+18	19
4	Naval Yard	14	7	2	5	27	16	+11	16
5	YMCA	14	7	1	6	21	15	+6	15
6	RAMC	14	4	0	10	18	38	−20	8
7	Club Lusitano	14	1	1	12	7	48	−41	3
8	Boy's Own Club	14	1	1	12	11	62	−51	3

Source: rsssf.com
(C) Champions
