= 1933–34 Hong Kong First Division League =

Hong Kong First Division
- Season: 1933–34
- Champions: South Welsh Borderers (1st title)
- Matches: 132
- Goals: 497 (3.77 per match)

The 1933–34 Hong Kong First Division League season was the 26th since its establishment.

== League table ==
Pos	Team	Pld	W	D	L	GF	GA	GD	Pts
1	South Welsh Borderers (C)	22	17	1	4	71	29	+42	35
2	St. Joseph's	22	15	5	2	46	21	+25	35
3	Lincolnshire Regiment	22	14	2	6	53	25	+28	30
4	Royal Navy	22	13	4	5	57	40	+17	30
5	South China	22	13	2	7	45	23	+22	28
6	HKFC	22	9	3	10	51	56	−5	21
7	Kowloon FC	22	8	2	12	39	51	−12	18
8	Eastern Lancashire Regiment	22	7	4	11	27	47	−20	18
9	Royal Garrison Artillery	22	8	1	13	27	48	−21	17
10	Police	22	5	3	14	22	39	−17	13
11	Chinese Athletic Association	22	5	0	17	35	53	−18	10
12	Club de Recreio	22	3	3	16	24	70	−46	9

Source: rsssf.com
(C) Champions

=== Championship playoff ===
1934-05-04

South Welsh Borderers	3 – 0	St. Joseph's
Fortey (3 goals)

Kowloon Football Club Stadium
