= 1926–27 Hong Kong First Division League =

Hong Kong First Division
- Season: 1926–27
- Champions: Clube de Recreio (1st title)
- Matches: 108
- Goals: 151 (1.4 per match)

The 1926–27 Hong Kong First Division League season was the 19th since its establishment.

== League table ==
Pos	Team	Pld	W	D	L	GF	GA	GD	Pts
1	Clube de Recreio (C)	14	9	2	3	35	19	+16	20
2	Chinese Athletic Association	14	7	4	3	22	23	−1	18
3	Police	14	6	3	5	11	14	−3	15
4	Kowloon FC	13	6	2	5	23	14	+9	14
5	Royal Garrison Artillery	14	6	2	6	20	19	+1	14
6	KOSB	14	6	2	6	20	19	+1	14
7	HKFC	12	5	1	6	14	17	−3	11
8	South China	13	2	0	11	6	26	−20	4
9	Royal Navy (W)	0	0	0	0	0	0	0	0

Source: rsssf.com
(C) Champions; (W) Withdrew following the season
