= 1946–47 Hong Kong First Division League =

Hong Kong First Division
- Season: 1946–47
- Champions: Sing Tao

The 1946–47 Hong Kong First Division League season was the 36th since its establishment.

== Overview ==
Sing Tao won the title.
