= 1931–32 Hong Kong First Division League =

Hong Kong First Division
- Season: 1931–32
- Champions: Royal Navy (2nd title)

The 1931–32 Hong Kong First Division League season was the 24th since its establishment.

== Overview ==
Royal Navy won the title.
