= 1934–35 Hong Kong First Division League =

Hong Kong First Division
- Season: 1934–35
- Champions: South China A (4th title)
- Matches: 155
- Goals: 631 (4.07 per match)

The 1934–35 Hong Kong First Division League season was the 27th since its establishment.

== League table ==
Pos	Team	Pld	W	D	L	GF	GA	GD	Pts
1	South China A (C)	24	18	4	2	70	30	+40	40
2	Police	24	12	7	5	61	42	+19	31
3	Club de Recreio	24	12	5	7	62	47	+15	29
4	HKFC	24	10	9	5	52	48	+4	29
5	Royal Navy	24	10	6	8	45	34	+11	26
6	South China B	24	10	6	8	49	51	−2	26
7	Chinese Athletic Association	24	9	7	8	58	48	+10	25
8	Fusiliers	24	9	7	8	51	44	+7	25
9	Lincolnshire Regiment	24	11	2	11	51	47	+4	24
10	Eastern Lancashire Regiment	24	6	6	12	43	49	−6	18
11	Royal Garrison Artillery	24	7	2	15	37	76	−39	16 (Note: St. Joseph's forfeited their final match with RGA due to lack of players.)
12	St. Joseph's	24	6	3	15	25	51	−26	15
13	Kowloon FC	24	2	4	18	27	65	−38	8

Source: rsssf.com
(C) Champions
