= 1949–50 Hong Kong First Division League =

Hong Kong First Division
- Season: 1949–50
- Champions: Kitchee
- Matches played: 155
- Goals scored: 643 (4.15 per match)

The 1949–50 Hong Kong First Division League season was the 39th since its establishment.

== League table ==
Pos	Team	Pld	W	D	L	GF	GA	GD	Pts
1	Kitchee (C)	24	20	3	1	89	16	+73	43
2	KMB	24	18	2	4	77	31	+46	38
3	St Joseph's	24	16	2	6	59	43	+16	34
4	Army	23	14	4	5	66	32	+34	32
5	44 Commandos (W)	24	13	2	9	67	50	+17	28
6	South China	24	11	3	10	56	63	−7	25
7	Royal Navy	24	9	3	12	35	49	−14	21
8	Police	24	7	6	11	33	41	−8	20
9	HKFC	24	6	5	13	33	59	−26	17
10	Eastern	24	7	3	14	38	69	−31	17
11	Chinese Athletic Association	24	5	6	13	31	47	−16	16
12	Royal Air Force	23	4	3	16	39	75	−36	11
13	Kwong Wah	24	4	0	20	20	68	−48	8

Source: rsssf.com
(C) Champions; (W) Withdrew following the season
