= 1955–56 Hong Kong First Division League =

Hong Kong First Division
- Season: 1955–56
- Champions: Eastern
- Matches played: 156
- Goals scored: 912 (5.85 per match)

The 1955–56 Hong Kong First Division League season was the 45th since its establishment.

== League table ==
| Pos | Team | Pld | W | D | L | GF | GA | GD | Pts |
|---|---|---|---|---|---|---|---|---|---|
| 1 | Eastern (C) | 24 | 21 | 0 | 3 | 87 | 38 | +49 | 42 |
| 2 | South China | 24 | 20 | 1 | 3 | 147 | 41 | +106 | 41 |
| 3 | KMB | 24 | 17 | 3 | 4 | 107 | 37 | +70 | 37 |
| 4 | Sing Tao | 24 | 17 | 3 | 4 | 85 | 44 | +41 | 37 |
| 5 | Kitchee | 24 | 15 | 2 | 7 | 81 | 44 | +37 | 32 |
| 6 | Army | 24 | 11 | 4 | 9 | 63 | 47 | +16 | 26 |
| 7 | Chinese Athletic Association | 24 | 10 | 2 | 12 | 70 | 69 | +1 | 22 |
| 8 | Royal Air Force | 24 | 10 | 2 | 12 | 56 | 61 | −5 | 22 |
| 9 | Kwong Wah | 24 | 7 | 4 | 13 | 54 | 66 | −12 | 18 |
| 10 | Royal Navy | 24 | 6 | 2 | 16 | 59 | 119 | −60 | 14 |
| 11 | St. Joseph's | 24 | 5 | 0 | 19 | 36 | 122 | −86 | 10 |
| 12 | Police | 24 | 4 | 2 | 18 | 46 | 91 | −45 | 10 |
| 13 | HKFC | 24 | 0 | 1 | 23 | 21 | 133 | −112 | 1 |

Source: rsssf.com
(C) Champions
