= 1986–87 Hong Kong First Division League =

Hong Kong First Division
- Season: 1986–87
- Champions: South China
- Relegated: HKFC; Police
- Matches played: 56
- Goals scored: 141 (2.52 per match)

The 1986–87 Hong Kong First Division League season was the 76th since its establishment. It was the first season where only players with permanent residency were allowed to register.

== League table ==
Pos	Team	Pld	W	D	L	GF	GA	GD	Pts
1	South China (C)	14	10	0	4	37	7	+30	20
2	Eastern	14	8	3	3	17	9	+8	19
3	Happy Valley	14	9	0	5	28	10	+18	18
4	Sea Bee	14	7	3	4	13	8	+5	17
5	Tsuen Wan	14	5	4	5	18	21	−3	14
6	Double Flower	14	4	3	7	12	19	−7	11
7	HKFC (R)	14	4	3	7	9	28	−19	11
8	Police (R)	14	0	2	12	7	39	−32	2

Source: rsssf.com
(C) Champions; (R) Relegated
