= 1976–77 Hong Kong First Division League =

Hong Kong First Division
- Season: 1976–77
- Champions: South China
- Relegated: Kwong Wah; Kowloon Motor Bus
- Matches played: 132
- Goals scored: 336 (2.55 per match)

The 1976–77 Hong Kong First Division League season was the 66th since its establishment.

== League table ==
Pos	Team	Pld	W	D	L	GF	GA	GD	Pts
1	South China (C)	22	15	5	2	47	20	+27	35
2	Seiko	22	13	8	1	44	23	+21	34
3	Happy Valley	22	12	6	4	44	21	+23	30
4	Caroline Hill	22	9	9	4	27	17	+10	27
5	Tung Sing	22	7	8	7	28	29	−1	22
6	Rangers	22	6	9	7	20	26	−6	21
7	Sea Bee	22	6	8	8	25	30	−5	20
8	Eastern	22	6	8	8	25	34	−9	20
9	Urban Services	22	5	7	10	21	28	−7	17
10	Yuen Long	22	6	5	11	23	36	−13	17
11	Kwong Wah (R)	22	5	6	11	20	28	−8	16
12	KMB (R)	22	0	5	17	12	44	−32	5

Source: rsssf.com
(C) Champions; (R) Relegated
