= 1911–12 Hong Kong First Division League =

Hong Kong First Division
- Season: 1911–12
- Champions: King's Own Rifles (1st title)

The 1911–12 Hong Kong First Division League season was the 4th since its establishment.

== Overview ==
King's Own Rifiles won the championship.
