= 1985–86 Hong Kong First Division League =

Hong Kong First Division
- Season: 1985–86
- Champions: South China
- Relegated: Rangers; Tung Sing
- Matches played: 90
- Goals scored: 236 (2.62 per match)

The 1985–86 Hong Kong First Division League season was the 75th since its establishment. It produced a rare instance of two unbeaten teams in the same league, as South China and Happy Valley both won 10 games and drew the other 8. South China won the league on goal difference.

== League table ==
Pos	Team	Pld	W	D	L	GF	GA	GD	Pts
1	South China (C)	18	10	8	0	26	5	+21	28
2	Happy Valley	18	10	8	0	29	13	+16	28
3	Sea Bee	18	8	8	2	31	19	+12	24
4	Seiko (W)	18	7	7	4	35	23	+12	21
5	Double Flower	18	6	6	6	22	24	−2	18
6	Tsuen Wan	18	6	2	10	20	21	−1	14
7	Eastern	18	4	6	8	22	28	−6	14
8	Harps (W)	18	6	2	10	15	21	−6	14
9	Rangers (R)	18	4	6	8	22	33	−11	14
10	Tung Sing (R)	18	1	3	14	14	49	−35	5

Source: rsssf.com
(C) Champions; (R) Relegated; (W) Withdrew from the league system after the season.
