= 1922–23 Hong Kong First Division League =

Hong Kong First Division
- Season: 1922–23
- Champions: King's Own Rifiles (1st title)

The 1922–23 Hong Kong First Division League season was the 15th since its establishment.

== Overview ==
King's Own Rifiles won the title.
