= 1928–29 Hong Kong First Division League =

Hong Kong First Division
- Season: 1928–29
- Champions: Chinese Athletic Association (2nd title)
- Matches: 108
- Goals: 369 (3.42 per match)

The 1928–29 Hong Kong First Division League season was the 21st since its establishment.

== League table ==
Pos	Team	Pld	W	D	L	GF	GA	GD	Pts
1	Chinese Athletic Association (C)	20	13	4	3	42	22	+20	30
2	Somerset Light Infantry Regiment	20	13	4	3	53	17	+36	30
3	South China	20	12	2	6	36	25	+11	26
4	King’s Own Scottish Borderers	20	11	3	6	48	26	+22	25
5	Police	20	10	3	7	26	22	+4	23
6	Royal Navy	19	10	1	8	42	27	+15	21
7	Kowloon FC	20	7	6	7	20	27	−7	20
8	Royal Garrison Artillery	20	7	0	13	24	42	−18	14
9	Club de Recreio	18	5	3	10	42	43	−1	13
10	HKFC	19	4	4	11	22	41	−19	12
11	Army Small Units	20	1	0	19	14	76	−62	2

Source: rsssf.com
(C) Champions

=== Championship playoff ===
1929-04-27

Chinese Athletic Association	1 – 1 (a.e.t.)	Somerset Light Infantry Regiment

South China Stadium

=== Championship playoff (replay) ===
1929-04-29

Chinese Athletic Association	2 – 1	Somerset Light Infantry Regiment
