= 1909–10 Hong Kong First Division League =

Hong Kong First Division
- Season: 1909–10
- Champions: RGA (1st title)
- Matches: 29
- Goals: 121 (4.17 per match)

The 1909–10 Hong Kong First Division League season was the second since its establishment.

== League table ==
Pos	Team	Pld	W	D	L	GF	GA	GD	Pts
1	RGA (C)	9	9	0	0	27	4	+23	18
2	Buffs	10	8	0	2	35	12	+23	16
?	Royal Engineers	10	2	2	6	19	30	−11	6
?	Kowloon	10	2	2	6	13	26	−13	6
?	Naval Yard	9	3	0	6	15	28	−13	6
?	HKFC	10	2	2	6	12	30	−18	6

Source: rsssf.com
(C) Champions

== Bibliography ==
- 1909–10 Hong Kong First Division table (RSSSF)
