= 1935–36 Hong Kong First Division League =

Football league season

Hong Kong First Division
- Season: 1935–36
- Champions: South China A
- Matches: 182
- Goals: 708 (3.89 per match)

The 1935–36 Hong Kong First Division League season was the 28th since its establishment.

== League table ==
Pos	Team	Pld	W	D	L	GF	GA	GD	Pts
1	South China A (C)	26	19	2	5	79	31	+48	40
2	Chinese Athletic Association	26	14	9	3	46	26	+20	37
3	Royal Welch Fusiliers	26	14	7	5	68	38	+30	35
4	Police	24	13	8	3	58	31	+27	34
5	South China B	26	12	9	5	52	37	+15	33
6	Royal Navy	26	16	0	10	68	54	+14	32
7	HKFC	26	13	5	8	61	41	+20	31
8	Royal Ulster Rifles	26	9	9	8	49	39	+10	27
9	Eastern Lancashire Regiment	26	11	4	11	49	48	+1	26
10	St. Joseph's	26	9	2	15	44	72	−28	20
11	Club de Recreio	26	7	5	14	34	46	−12	19
12	Kowloon FC	26	7	3	16	41	55	−14	17
13	Royal Garrison Artillery (Lyemun)	26	3	2	21	42	82	−40	8
14	Royal Garrison Artillery (Stonecutters)	26	1	3	22	17	108	−91	5

Source: rsssf.com
(C) Champions
