= 1937–38 Hong Kong First Division League =

Hong Kong First Division
- Season: 1937–38
- Champions: South China B

The 1937–38 Hong Kong First Division League season was the 30th since its establishment.

== Overview ==
South China B won the championship.
