= 1925–26 Hong Kong First Division League =

Hong Kong First Division
- Season: 1925–26
- Champions: Kowloon FC (1st title)
- Matches: 56
- Goals: 173 (3.09 per match)

The 1925–26 Hong Kong First Division League season was the 18th since its establishment.

== League table ==
Pos	Team	Pld	W	D	L	GF	GA	GD	Pts
1	Kowloon FC (C)	14	11	1	2	45	9	+36	23
2	East Surrey Regiment	14	10	2	2	33	10	+23	22
3	HKFC	14	7	2	5	14	15	−1	16
4	South China	14	7	2	5	16	20	−4	16
5	Police	14	4	2	8	16	23	−7	10
6	Club de Recreio	14	4	1	9	22	25	−3	9
7	Royal Garrison Artillery	14	3	4	7	18	34	−16	9 (Note: 1 point deducted?)
8	Royal Navy	14	3	1	10	9	37	−28	7

Source: rsssf.com
(C) Champions
