= 1923–24 Hong Kong First Division League =

Hong Kong First Division
- Season: 1923–24
- Champions: South China (1st title)

The 1923–24 Hong Kong First Division League season was the 16th since its establishment.

== Overview ==
South China won the championship.
