= 1953–54 Hong Kong First Division League =

Hong Kong First Division
- Season: 1953–54
- Champions: KMB
- Matches played: 156
- Goals scored: 700 (4.49 per match)

The 1953–54 Hong Kong First Division League season was the 43rd since its establishment.

== League table ==
Pos	Team	Pld	W	D	L	GF	GA	GD	Pts
1	KMB (C)	24	20	1	3	84	25	+59	41
2	South China	24	19	2	3	78	16	+62	40
3	Kitchee	24	15	5	4	66	33	+33	35
4	Army	24	14	5	5	57	27	+30	33
5	Kwong Wah	24	13	3	8	69	45	+24	29
6	Sing Tao	24	11	3	10	47	53	−6	25
7	HKFC	24	9	3	12	54	62	−8	21
8	Eastern	24	8	5	11	45	53	−8	21
9	Royal Air Force	24	9	2	13	60	77	−17	20
10	Political	24	9	2	13	50	57	−7	20
11	Chinese Athletic Association	24	3	4	17	24	68	−44	10
12	Royal Navy	24	3	3	18	30	78	−48	9
13	St Joseph's	24	4	0	20	36	106	−70	8

Source: rsssf.com
(C) Champions
