= 1921–22 Hong Kong First Division League =

Hong Kong First Division
- Season: 1921–22
- Champions: HMS Curlew (1st title)

The 1921–22 Hong Kong First Division League season was the 14th since its establishment.

== Overview ==
HMS Curlew and HKFC both finished level atop the table on 29 points resulting in a play-off to determine the league champions on 22 April 1922. HMS Curiew won the match 1–0.
