= 1917–18 Hong Kong First Division League =

Hong Kong First Division
- Season: 1917–18
- Champions: Royal Garrison Artillery (5th title)

The 1917–18 Hong Kong First Division League season was the 10th since its establishment.

== Overview ==
Royal Garrison Artillery won the championship.
