= 1952–53 Hong Kong First Division League =

Hong Kong First Division
- Season: 1952–53
- Champions: South China
- Matches played: 156
- Goals scored: 661 (4.24 per match)

The 1952–53 Hong Kong First Division League season was the 42nd since its establishment.

== League table ==
| Pos | Team | Pld | W | D | L | GF | GA | GD | Pts |
|---|---|---|---|---|---|---|---|---|---|
| 1 | South China (C) | 24 | 19 | 4 | 1 | 81 | 22 | +59 | 42 |
| 2 | Kitchee | 24 | 18 | 3 | 3 | 62 | 32 | +30 | 39 |
| 3 | Eastern | 24 | 16 | 4 | 4 | 69 | 30 | +39 | 36 |
| 4 | Army | 24 | 13 | 6 | 5 | 50 | 31 | +19 | 32 |
| 5 | KMB | 24 | 12 | 6 | 6 | 72 | 34 | +38 | 30 |
| 6 | Sing Tao | 24 | 10 | 4 | 10 | 58 | 49 | +9 | 24 |
| 7 | Royal Air Force | 24 | 8 | 5 | 11 | 42 | 55 | −13 | 21 |
| 8 | Chinese Athletic Association | 24 | 7 | 5 | 12 | 42 | 53 | −11 | 19 |
| 9 | Kwong Wah | 24 | 4 | 11 | 9 | 37 | 51 | −14 | 19 |
| 10 | HKFC | 24 | 7 | 4 | 13 | 42 | 53 | −11 | 18 |
| 11 | Police | 24 | 4 | 7 | 13 | 41 | 67 | −26 | 15 |
| 12 | St Joseph's | 24 | 5 | 2 | 17 | 35 | 81 | −46 | 12 |
| 13 | Royal Navy | 24 | 1 | 3 | 20 | 30 | 103 | −73 | 5 |

Source: rsssf.com
(C) Champions
