= 1930–31 Hong Kong First Division League =

Hong Kong First Division
- Season: 1930–31
- Champions: South China (2nd title)
- Matches: 110
- Goals: 407 (3.7 per match)

The 1930–31 Hong Kong First Division League season was the 23rd since its establishment.

== League table ==
Pos	Team	Pld	W	D	L	GF	GA	GD	Pts
1	South China (C)	20	17	1	2	69	20	+49	35
2	Kowloon FC	20	12	5	3	47	28	+19	29
3	Argylis	20	13	2	5	43	32	+11	28
4	Royal Navy	20	11	2	7	63	39	+24	24
5	South Wales Borderers	20	11	2	7	36	26	+10	24
6	Chinese Athletic Association	20	10	1	9	35	27	+8	21
7	Club de Recreio	20	9	1	10	31	38	−7	19
8	Royal Garrison Artillery	20	6	1	13	21	54	−33	13
9	HKFC	20	4	3	13	15	48	−33	11
10	Police	20	4	2	14	25	39	−14	10
11	St. Joseph's	20	3	0	17	22	56	−34	6

Source: rsssf.com
(C) Champions
