= 1914–15 Hong Kong First Division League =

Hong Kong First Division
- Season: 1914–15
- Champions: Royal Garrison Artillery (3rd title)
- Matches: 12
- Goals: 23 (1.92 per match)

The 1914–15 Hong Kong First Division League season was the 7th since its establishment.

== League table ==
Pos	Team	Pld	W	D	L	GF	GA	GD	Pts
1	Royal Garrison Artillery (C)	6	3	3	0	10	5	+5	9
2	Police	6	1	3	2	6	6	0	5
3	HKFC	6	2	1	3	5	6	−1	5
4	Navy	6	1	3	2	2	6	−4	5

Source: rsssf.com
(C) Champions
