= 1939–40 Hong Kong First Division League =

Hong Kong First Division
- Season: 1939–40
- Champions: South China

The 1939–40 Hong Kong First Division League season was the 32nd since its establishment.

== Overview ==
South China won the title.
