= 1924–25 Hong Kong First Division League =

Hong Kong First Division
- Season: 1924–25
- Champions: East Surrey Regiment (1st title)
- Matches: 55
- Goals: 169 (3.07 per match)

The 1924–25 Hong Kong First Division League season was the 17th since its establishment.

== League table ==
| Pos | Team | Pld | W | D | L | GF | GA | GD | Pts |
|---|---|---|---|---|---|---|---|---|---|
| 1 | East Surrey Regiment (C) | 14 | 12 | 1 | 1 | 43 | 8 | +35 | 25 |
| 2 | South China A | 14 | 9 | 2 | 3 | 33 | 14 | +19 | 20 |
| 3 | Kowloon FC | 14 | 7 | 1 | 6 | 27 | 18 | +9 | 15 |
| 4 | HKFC | 13 | 6 | 2 | 5 | 21 | 13 | +8 | 14 |
| 5 | Police | 14 | 5 | 3 | 6 | 12 | 19 | −7 | 13 |
| 6 | Royal Garrison Artillery | 13 | 6 | 0 | 7 | 15 | 29 | −14 | 12 |
| 7 | Royal Navy | 14 | 4 | 1 | 9 | 12 | 15 | −3 | 9 |
| 8 | South China B | 14 | 1 | 0 | 13 | 6 | 54 | −48 | 2 |

Source: rsssf.com
(C) Champions
