= 1950–51 Hong Kong First Division League =

Hong Kong First Division
- Season: 1950–51
- Champions: South China
- Matches played: 132
- Goals scored: 604 (4.58 per match)

The 1950–51 Hong Kong First Division League season was the 40th since its establishment.

== League table ==
Pos	Team	Pld	W	D	L	GF	GA	GD	Pts
1	South China (C)	22	18	1	3	84	30	+54	37
2	KMB	22	18	1	3	57	23	+34	37
3	Army	22	15	2	5	79	36	+43	32
4	Kitchee	22	14	2	6	52	32	+20	30
5	Kwong Wah	22	13	2	7	60	42	+18	28
6	Police	22	9	3	10	46	54	−8	21
7	HKFC	22	8	3	11	44	66	−22	19
8	Royal Navy	22	6	3	13	55	64	−9	15
9	Chinese Athletic Association	22	5	3	14	38	61	−23	13
10	St Joseph's	22	5	2	15	35	59	−24	12
11	Eastern	22	3	4	15	29	65	−36	10
12	Royal Air Force	22	3	4	15	25	72	−47	10

Source: rsssf.com
(C) Champions
