= 1995–96 Hong Kong First Division League =

Hong Kong First Division
- Season: 1995–96
- Champions: Instant-Dict; 1st Hong Kong title
- Relegated: HKFC
- Matches: 90
- Goals: 292 (3.24 per match)
- Top goalscorer: Paul Foster (Instant-Dict) (19 goals)

The 1995–96 Hong Kong First Division League season was the 85th since its establishment.

== First stage ==
Pos	Team	Pld	W	D	L	GF	GA	GD	Pts
1	South China (G)	9	7	2	0	31	7	+24	23
2	Instant-Dict	9	6	3	0	23	4	+19	21
3	Golden	9	4	4	1	16	16	0	16
4	Uhlsport Rangers	9	4	3	2	17	15	+2	15
5	Sing Tao	9	4	1	4	13	13	0	13
6	Frankwell (W)	9	2	4	3	12	10	+2	10
7	Happy Valley	9	2	3	4	18	14	+4	9
8	Mansion (W)	9	3	0	6	12	21	−9	9
9	Eastern	9	2	2	5	10	15	−5	8
10	HKFC (R)	9	0	0	9	8	47	−39	0

Source: see References
Rules for classification: 1) points; 2) goal difference; 3) number of goals scored.
(G) Grand Final; (R) Relegated; (W) Withdrew from league system after the season

== Second stage ==
Pos	Team	Pld	W	D	L	GF	GA	GD	Pts
1	Instant-Dict (G, C)	9	6	2	1	28	5	+23	20
2	South China	9	6	2	1	18	7	+11	20
3	Golden	9	5	2	2	19	9	+10	17
4	Happy Valley	9	3	4	2	12	8	+4	13
5	Eastern	9	4	1	4	7	14	−7	13
6	Mansion (W)	9	3	2	4	8	16	−8	11
7	Sing Tao	9	3	1	5	8	13	−5	10
8	Uhlsport Rangers	9	3	1	5	13	20	−7	10
9	Frankwell (W)	9	2	3	4	11	13	−2	9
10	HKFC (R)	9	0	2	7	8	27	−19	2

Source: see References
Rules for classification: 1) points; 2) goal difference; 3) number of goals scored.
(C) Champions; (G) Grand Final; (R) Relegated; (W) Withdrew from league system after the season

== Grand final ==
30 May 1996
20:00 GMT+8

South China	0–1	Instant-Dict
		Costello

Hong Kong Stadium
Attendance: 31,210
Referee: Ng Yim Kin
