= 1974–75 Hong Kong First Division League =

Hong Kong First Division
- Season: 1974–75
- Champions: Seiko
- Relegated: Mackinnons; Jardines; Telephone
- Matches played: 156
- Goals scored: 438 (2.81 per match)

The 1974–75 Hong Kong First Division League season was the 64th since its establishment.

== League table ==
Pos	Team	Pld	W	D	L	GF	GA	GD	Pts
1	Seiko (C)	24	15	5	4	54	21	+33	35
2	Happy Valley	24	15	5	4	51	31	+20	35
3	Rangers	24	14	5	5	43	28	+15	33
4	South China	24	11	10	3	44	19	+25	32
5	Kwong Wah	24	12	7	5	41	25	+16	31
6	Tung Sing	24	13	4	7	42	32	+10	30
7	Caroline Hill	24	11	4	9	37	34	+3	26
8	Eastern	24	5	9	10	19	23	−4	19
9	Yuen Long	24	7	5	12	29	43	−14	19
10	Urban Services	24	5	6	13	20	43	−23	16
11	Mackinnons (R)	24	3	9	12	22	40	−18	15
12	Jardines (R)	24	4	6	14	20	40	−20	14
13	Telephone (R)	24	1	5	18	16	59	−43	7

Source: rsssf.com
(C) Champions; (R) Relegated
