= 1962–63 Hong Kong First Division League =

Hong Kong First Division
- Season: 1962–63
- Champions: Yuen Long
- Relegated: Sing Tao; Tung Sing
- Matches played: 132
- Goals scored: 509 (3.86 per match)

The 1962–63 Hong Kong First Division League season was the 52nd since its establishment.

== League table ==
Pos	Team	Pld	W	D	L	GF	GA	GD	Pts
1	Yuen Long (C)	22	15	4	3	50	34	+16	34
2	Tung Wah	22	13	7	2	63	23	+40	33
3	Kitchee	22	12	8	2	44	20	+24	32
4	Happy Valley	22	14	4	4	58	33	+25	32
5	Kwong Wah	22	12	7	3	59	33	+26	31
6	South China	22	13	4	5	52	30	+22	30
7	Five-One-Seven	22	4	9	9	31	45	−14	17
8	KMB	22	5	5	12	36	40	−4	15
9	Eastern	22	6	3	13	37	69	−32	15
10	Police	22	6	0	16	42	67	−25	12
11	Sing Tao (R)	22	2	3	17	22	62	−40	7
12	Tung Sing (R)	22	1	4	17	15	53	−38	6

Source: rsssf.com
(C) Champions; (R) Relegated
