= 1932–33 Hong Kong First Division League =

Hong Kong First Division
- Season: 1932–33
- Champions: South China (3rd title)
- Matches: 110
- Goals: 467 (4.25 per match)

The 1932–33 Hong Kong First Division League season was the 25th since its establishment.

== League table ==
Pos	Team	Pld	W	D	L	GF	GA	GD	Pts
1	South China (C)	20	15	1	4	60	20	+40	31
2	South Wales Borderers	20	14	2	4	62	25	+37	30
3	Royal Garrison Artillery	20	15	0	5	60	30	+30	30
4	Lincolnshire Regiment	20	10	4	6	52	32	+20	24
5	Royal Navy	20	9	2	9	46	41	+5	20
6	Chinese Athletic Association	20	9	3	8	51	47	+4	21
7	HKFC	20	8	2	10	24	54	−30	18
8	St. Joseph's	20	8	1	11	30	41	−11	17
9	Police	20	7	0	13	28	35	−7	14
10	Kowloon FC	20	5	1	14	32	42	−10	11
11	Club de Recreio	20	2	0	18	22	100	−78	4

Source: rsssf.com
(C) Champions
