= 1954–55 Hong Kong First Division League =

Hong Kong First Division
- Season: 1954–55
- Champions: South China
- Matches played: 156
- Goals scored: 752 (4.82 per match)

The 1954–55 Hong Kong First Division League season was the 44th since its establishment.

== League table ==
Pos	Team	Pld	W	D	L	GF	GA	GD	Pts
1	South China (C)	24	19	2	3	103	26	+77	40
2	Kitchee	24	18	2	4	78	31	+47	38
3	KMB	24	16	4	4	78	26	+52	36
4	Sing Tao	24	14	5	5	63	28	+35	33
5	Kwong Wah	24	12	6	6	63	41	+22	30
6	Eastern	24	11	4	9	51	42	+9	26
7	Army	24	11	3	10	70	57	+13	25
8	St. Joseph's	24	10	2	12	52	58	−6	22
9	Royal Air Force	24	7	3	14	41	69	−28	17
10	Police	24	8	0	16	47	70	−23	16
11	Chinese Athletic Association	24	5	4	15	46	65	−19	14
12	HKFC	24	6	0	18	38	92	−54	12
13	Royal Navy	24	0	3	21	22	147	−125	3

Source: rsssf.com
(C) Champions
