= 1927–28 Hong Kong First Division League =

Hong Kong First Division
- Season: 1927–28
- Champions: Chinese Athletic Association (1st title)

The 1927–28 Hong Kong First Division League season was the 20th since its establishment.

== Overview ==
Chinese Athletic Association won the title.
