= 1957–58 Hong Kong First Division League =

Football league

Hong Kong First Division
- Season: 1957–58
- Champions: South China
- Relegated: Jardines; HKFC; Royal Air Force
- Matches played: 156
- Goals scored: 801 (5.13 per match)

The 1957–58 Hong Kong First Division League season was the 47th since its establishment.

== League table ==
Pos	Team	Pld	W	D	L	GF	GA	GD	Pts
1	South China (C)	24	22	1	1	137	22	+115	45
2	KMB	23	19	2	2	101	35	+66	40
3	Kitchee	22	13	6	3	71	49	+22	32
4	Chinese Athletic Association	24	10	6	8	52	48	+4	26
5	Police	24	9	6	9	73	75	−2	24
6	Eastern	24	10	2	12	39	50	−11	22
7	Sing Tao	24	9	3	12	58	59	−1	21
8	Army	22	9	2	11	42	64	−22	20
9	Tung Wah	24	7	5	12	41	78	−37	19
10	Kwong Wah	24	7	4	13	55	76	−21	18
11	Jardines (R)	24	6	4	14	47	70	−23	16
12	HKFC (R)	24	3	7	14	46	91	−45	13
13	Royal Air Force (R)	23	5	0	18	39	84	−45	10

Source: rsssf.com
(C) Champions; (R) Relegated
