= 1929–30 Hong Kong First Division League =

Hong Kong First Division
- Season: 1929–30
- Champions: Chinese Athletic Association (3rd title)
- Matches: 110
- Goals: 349 (3.17 per match)

The 1929–30 Hong Kong First Division League season was the 22nd since its establishment.

== League table ==
Pos	Team	Pld	W	D	L	GF	GA	GD	Pts
1	Chinese Athletic Association (C)	20	14	3	3	48	20	+28	31
2	Royal Navy	20	13	5	2	39	22	+17	31
3	Somerset Light Infantry Regiment	20	13	2	5	43	17	+26	28
4	King’s Own Scottish Borderers	20	11	6	3	45	21	+24	28
5	South China	20	10	4	6	28	15	+13	24
6	Royal Garrison Artillery	20	9	2	9	31	33	−2	20
7	Kowloon FC	20	7	3	10	33	31	+2	17
8	HKFC	20	4	5	11	22	37	−15	13
9	Club de Recreio	20	4	2	14	19	41	−22	10
10	St. Joseph's	20	4	2	14	18	59	−41	10
11	Police	20	3	2	15	20	50	−30	8

Source: rsssf.com
(C) Champions
