= 1981–82 Hong Kong First Division League =

Football season

Hong Kong First Division
- Season: 1981–82
- Champions: Seiko
- Relegated: Caroline Hill; Po Chai Pills
- Matches played: 110
- Goals scored: 283 (2.57 per match)

The 1981–82 Hong Kong First Division League season was the 71st since its establishment.

== League table ==
Pos	Team	Pld	W	D	L	GF	GA	GD	Pts
1	Seiko (C)	20	15	4	1	45	15	+30	34
2	Happy Valley	20	11	6	3	30	14	+16	28
3	Bulova	20	7	9	4	33	19	+14	23
4	Eastern	20	8	4	8	25	24	+1	20
5	Sea Bee	20	7	5	8	28	31	−3	19
6	Tsuen Wan	20	6	7	7	22	27	−5	19
7	South China	20	6	5	9	22	24	−2	17
8	Tung Sing	20	6	5	9	26	31	−5	17
9	Rangers	20	4	9	7	16	22	−6	17
10	Caroline Hill (R)	20	4	8	8	21	32	−11	16
11	Po Chai Pills (R)	20	3	4	13	15	44	−29	10

Source: rsssf.com
(C) Champions; (R) Relegated
