= 1971–72 Hong Kong First Division League =

Hong Kong First Division
- Season: 1971–72
- Champions: South China
- Relegated: Tsuen Wan; Army
- Matches played: 182
- Goals scored: 632 (3.47 per match)

The 1971–72 Hong Kong First Division League season was the 61st since its establishment.

== League table ==
Pos	Team	Pld	W	D	L	GF	GA	GD	Pts
1	South China (C)	26	15	7	4	50	23	+27	37
2	Caroline Hill	26	14	5	7	53	38	+15	33
3	Fire Services	26	12	6	8	66	45	+21	30
4	Sing Tao	26	11	7	8	57	48	+9	29
5	Eastern	26	9	10	7	49	32	+17	28
6	Tung Sing	26	9	10	7	44	33	+11	28
7	Rangers	26	9	9	8	61	51	+10	27
8	Happy Valley	26	10	7	9	36	35	+1	27
9	Yuen Long	26	9	8	9	41	42	−1	26
10	Telephone	26	9	7	10	42	45	−3	25
11	Police	26	10	5	11	45	53	−8	25
12	KMB	26	8	8	10	37	33	+4	24
13	Tsuen Wan (R)	26	7	7	12	30	46	−16	21
14	Army (R)	26	2	0	24	23	108	−85	4

Source: rsssf.com
(C) Champions; (R) Relegated
