= 1918–19 Hong Kong First Division League =

Hong Kong First Division
- Season: 1918–19
- Champions: Royal Navy (1st title)
- Matches: 17
- Goals: 45 (2.65 per match)

The 1918–19 Hong Kong First Division League season was the 11th since its establishment.

== League table ==
Pos	Team	Pld	W	D	L	GF	GA	GD	Pts
1	Royal Navy (C)	8	5	2	1	20	3	+17	12
2	HKFC	8	5	1	2	13	5	+8	11
3	Royal Engineers	6	2	1	3	3	12	−9	5
4	Royal Garrison Artillery	5	1	2	2	3	8	−5	4
5	South China	7	0	2	5	6	17	−11	2
6	Manchester Regiment (W)	0	0	0	0	0	0	0	0

Source: rsssf.com
(C) Champions; (W) Withdrew following the season
