= 1998–99 Hong Kong First Division League =

Hong Kong First Division League
- Season: 1998–99
- Champions: Happy Valley; 3rd Hong Kong title
- Matches: 56
- Goals: 201 (3.59 per match)
- Top goalscorer: Tomy (Sai Kung Friends) (16 goals)

The 1998–99 Hong Kong First Division League season was the 88th since its establishment.

The first match was played on 30 August 1998 with Instant-Dict drew South China 2–2. However, as there was an ineligible player in Instant-Dict's squad and the team was penalised with a 0–3 loss.

== First stage ==
Pos	Team	Pld	W	D	L	GF	GA	GD	Pts	Qualification or relegation
1	Happy Valley	14	10	0	4	31	14	+17	30	To Grand Final
2	South China	14	6	4	4	24	15	+9	22	Championship Playoff
3	Yee Hope	14	6	4	4	30	27	+3	22	Championship Playoff
4	Golden	14	7	1	6	26	27	−1	22	Championship Playoff
5	Sing Tao	14	5	4	5	26	18	+8	19	Relegation Playoff
6	Instant-Dict	14	4	4	6	22	28	−6	16	Relegation Playoff
7	Rangers	14	4	4	6	21	29	−8	16	Relegation Playoff
8	Sai Kung Friends	14	3	1	10	21	43	−22	10	Relegation Playoff

== Second stage ==
NB: Teams take points and goals halved from first phase. GF and GA is rounded.

=== Championship playoff ===
Pos	Team	Pld	W	D	L	GF	GA	GD	Pts	Qualification
1	South China	6	4	2	0	19	11	+8	25	To Grand Final
2	Happy Valley	6	2	1	3	26	16	+10	22	
3	Yee Hope	6	2	1	3	26	26	0	18	
4	Golden	6	1	2	3	20	25	−5	16	

=== Relegation playoff ===
Pos	Team	Pld	W	D	L	GF	GA	GD	Pts	Relegation
5	Instant-Dict	6	5	0	1	27	18	+9	23	
6	Sing Tao	6	3	0	3	24	18	+6	18.5	Withdrew from the league system after the season.
7	Sai Kung Friends	6	3	0	3	21	34	−13	14	Relegation to Second Division by rules, but retained in the First Division as both HKFC and Fire Services declined promotion.
8	Rangers	6	1	0	5	15	31	−16	11	Relegation to Second Division by rules, but retained in the First Division as both HKFC and Fire Services declined promotion.

== Final ==
16 May 1999

Happy Valley	1–1 (a.e.t.)	South China
Bajkusa 41'		Cheng Siu Chung 80'
Penalties
	8–7

Hong Kong Stadium
Attendance: 10,258

First Division League 1998–99 winners

3rd title
