= 1964–65 Hong Kong First Division League =

Hong Kong First Division
- Season: 1964–65
- Champions: Happy Valley
- Relegated: Tung Sing; Army
- Matches played: 132
- Goals scored: 546 (4.14 per match)

The 1964–65 Hong Kong First Division League season was the 54th since its establishment.

== League table ==
Pos	Team	Pld	W	D	L	GF	GA	GD	Pts
1	Happy Valley (C)	22	17	1	4	59	33	+26	35
2	South China	22	14	5	3	68	35	+33	33
3	Sing Tao	22	11	2	9	67	47	+20	24
4	Police	22	10	4	8	42	38	+4	24
5	KMB	22	9	5	8	41	38	+3	23
6	Yuen Long	22	10	2	10	51	48	+3	22
7	Tung Wah	22	10	2	10	39	37	+2	22
8	Eastern	22	7	7	8	37	37	0	21
9	Kitchee	22	8	5	9	36	45	−9	21
10	Kwong Wah	22	8	4	10	40	47	−7	20
11	Tung Sing	22	7	4	11	40	50	−10	18
12	Army (R)	22	0	1	21	26	91	−65	1

Source: rsssf.com
(C) Champions; (R) Relegated
