= 1941–42 Hong Kong First Division League =

Hong Kong First Division
- Season: 1941–42

The 1941–42 Hong Kong First Division League season was the 34th since its establishment. The season was never finished due to the Battle of Hong Kong.
