= 1912–13 Hong Kong First Division League =

Hong Kong First Division
- Season: 1912–13
- Champions: Royal Garrison Artillery (2nd title)
- Matches: 20
- Goals: 66 (3.3 per match)

The 1912–13 Hong Kong First Division League season was the 5th since its establishment.

== League table ==
Pos	Team	Pld	W	D	L	GF	GA	GD	Pts
1	Royal Garrison Artillery (C)	8	5	3	0	16	6	+10	13
2	King's Own Yorkshire Light Infantry	8	5	2	1	15	7	+8	12
3	Royal Engineers	8	4	0	4	23	14	+9	8
4	HKFC	8	2	2	4	7	13	−6	6
5	Royal Navy	8	0	1	7	5	26	−21	1

Source: rsssf.com
(C) Champions
