= 1987–88 Hong Kong First Division League =

Hong Kong First Division
- Season: 1987–88
- Champions: South China
- Relegated: Po Chai Pills; May Ching
- Matches played: 108
- Goals scored: 245 (2.27 per match)

The 1987–88 Hong Kong First Division League season was the 77th since its establishment. Starting from this season, 3 points are awarded for a win in normal time. If a match ended in a draw after normal time, a penalty shootout would follow to determine the winner. The winner of the penalty shootout would be warded 2 points whereas the loser would receive 1 point.

== League table ==
Pos	Team	Pld	W	PKW	PKL	L	GF	GA	GD	Pts
1	South China (C)	24	18	2	2	2	51	13	+38	60
2	Happy Valley	24	16	5	2	1	40	10	+30	60
3	Sing Tao	24	10	5	1	8	27	26	+1	41
4	Sea Bee	24	8	1	6	9	28	28	0	32
5	Double Flower	24	6	5	2	11	21	30	−9	30
6	Eastern	24	6	3	5	10	21	34	−13	29
7	Tsuen Wan	24	5	6	2	11	19	36	−17	29
8	Po Chai Pills (R)	24	5	2	6	11	20	35	−15	25
9	May Ching (R)	24	3	2	5	14	22	33	−11	18

Source: RSSSF
Rules for classification: 2 points for draw won on penalties, 1 point for draw lost on penalties
(C) Champion; (R) Relegated
