= 1977–78 Hong Kong First Division League =

Hong Kong First Division
- Season: 1977–78
- Champions: South China
- Relegated: Rangers; HKFC
- Matches played: 132
- Goals scored: 316 (2.39 per match)

The 1977–78 Hong Kong First Division League season was the 67th since its establishment.

== League table ==
Pos	Team	Pld	W	D	L	GF	GA	GD	Pts
1	South China (C)	22	20	2	0	53	14	+39	42
2	Happy Valley	22	14	2	6	37	24	+13	30
3	Tung Sing	22	9	9	4	32	23	+9	27
4	Seiko	22	9	7	6	41	27	+14	25
5	Caroline Hill	22	8	7	7	28	22	+6	23
6	Yuen Long	21	8	5	8	21	27	−6	21
7	Urban Services	22	5	8	9	14	17	−3	18
8	Sea Bee	22	5	7	10	19	29	−10	17
9	Eastern	21	2	13	6	12	22	−10	17
10	Blake Garden	22	5	6	11	22	35	−13	16
11	Rangers (R)	22	3	8	11	19	39	−20	14
12	HKFC (R)	22	3	6	13	18	37	−19	12

Source: rsssf.com
(C) Champions; (R) Relegated
