= 1973–74 Hong Kong First Division League =

Hong Kong First Division
- Season: 1973–74
- Champions: South China
- Relegated: Police; HKFC
- Matches played: 182
- Goals scored: 548 (3.01 per match)

The 1973–74 Hong Kong First Division League season was the 63rd since its establishment.

== League table ==
Pos	Team	Pld	W	D	L	GF	GA	GD	Pts
1	South China (C)	26	18	4	4	61	23	+38	40
2	Seiko	26	17	4	5	75	36	+39	38
3	Caroline Hill	26	15	5	6	43	21	+22	35
4	Tung Sing	26	13	7	6	44	30	+14	33
5	Happy Valley	26	13	6	7	59	25	+34	32
6	Rangers	26	13	5	8	46	23	+23	31
7	Fire Services (W)	26	12	7	7	44	26	+18	31
8	Kwong Wah	26	12	4	10	38	31	+7	28
9	Eastern	26	11	5	10	32	34	−2	27
10	Yuen Long	26	10	5	11	32	34	−2	25
11	Mackinnons	26	5	8	13	20	36	−16	18
12	Telephone	26	4	6	16	20	50	−30	14
13	Police (R)	26	2	2	22	15	85	−70	6
14	HKFC (R)	26	2	2	22	19	94	−75	6

Source: rsssf.com
(C) Champions; (R) Relegated; (W) Withdrew from league system after the season
