= 1992–93 Hong Kong First Division League =

Hong Kong First Division
- Season: 1992–93
- Champions: Eastern
- Relegated: British Forces
- Matches played: 90
- Goals scored: 278 (3.09 per match)

The 1992–93 Hong Kong First Division League season was the 82nd since its establishment.

== League table ==
Pos	Team	Pld	W	D	L	GF	GA	GD	Pts
1	Eastern (C)	18	14	3	1	50	14	+36	45
2	South China	18	10	4	4	38	18	+20	34
3	Instant Dict	18	10	4	4	35	16	+19	34
4	Voicelink	18	8	4	6	21	17	+4	28
5	Sing Tao	18	8	3	7	20	25	−5	27
6	Kitchee	18	7	3	8	23	24	−1	24
7	Ernest Borel (Note: Ernest Borel folded after the season)	18	7	2	9	24	26	−2	23
8	Happy Valley	18	5	5	8	30	22	+8	20
9	Kui Tan	18	4	5	9	25	31	−6	17
10	British Forces (R)	18	0	1	17	12	85	−73	1

Source: rsssf.com
(C) Champions; (R) Relegated
