= 1965–66 Hong Kong First Division League =

Hong Kong First Division season

Hong Kong First Division
- Season: 1965–66
- Champions: South China
- Relegated: Kitchee; Kwong Wah
- Matches played: 132
- Goals scored: 556 (4.21 per match)

The 1965–66 Hong Kong First Division League season was the 55th since its establishment.

== League table ==
Pos	Team	Pld	W	D	L	GF	GA	GD	Pts
1	South China (C)	22	19	1	2	79	26	+53	39
2	Happy Valley	22	14	3	5	53	35	+18	31
3	Sing Tao	22	14	2	6	69	31	+38	30
4	Yuen Long	22	11	6	5	43	34	+9	28
5	Eastern	22	11	5	6	44	37	+7	27
6	Tung Sing	22	10	5	7	53	37	+16	25
7	Police	22	11	2	9	48	34	+14	24
8	KMB	22	9	6	7	44	38	+6	24
9	Rangers	22	5	4	13	40	50	−10	14
10	Tung Wah	22	5	3	14	34	57	−23	13
11	Kitchee (R)	22	1	4	17	26	92	−66	6
12	Kwong Wah (R)	22	1	1	20	23	85	−62	3

Source: rsssf.com
(C) Champions; (R) Relegated
