= 1967–68 Hong Kong First Division League =

Hong Kong First Division
- Season: 1967–68
- Champions: South China
- Relegated: Fire Services; Customs
- Matches played: 132
- Goals scored: 600 (4.55 per match)

The 1967–68 Hong Kong First Division League season was the 57th since its establishment.

== League table ==
Pos	Team	Pld	W	D	L	GF	GA	GD	Pts
1	South China (C)	22	18	2	2	78	21	+57	38
2	Sing Tao	22	16	3	3	79	24	+55	35
3	Eastern	22	15	2	5	62	47	+15	32
4	Tung Sing	22	12	2	8	43	32	+11	26
5	Yuen Long	22	11	4	7	57	46	+11	26
6	Police	22	12	1	9	65	45	+20	25
7	Rangers	22	10	2	10	44	41	+3	22
8	Telephone	22	9	4	9	43	49	−6	22
9	KMB	22	8	4	10	43	56	−13	20
10	Army	22	5	1	16	36	62	−26	11
11	Fire Services (R)	22	2	0	20	28	73	−45	4
12	Customs (R)	22	1	1	20	22	104	−82	3

Source: rsssf.com
(C) Champions; (R) Relegated
