= 1961–62 Hong Kong First Division League =

Hong Kong First Division
- Season: 1961–62
- Champions: South China
- Relegated: Army; Caroline Hill
- Matches played: 156
- Goals scored: 675 (4.33 per match)

The 1961–62 Hong Kong First Division League season was the 51st since its establishment.

== League table ==
Pos	Team	Pld	W	D	L	GF	GA	GD	Pts
1	South China (C)	24	21	2	1	91	27	+64	44
2	Happy Valley	24	18	4	2	84	29	+55	40
3	Sing Tao	24	14	7	3	66	31	+35	35
4	Kitchee	24	12	4	8	65	51	+14	28
5	KMB	24	10	7	7	53	49	+4	27
6	Police	24	9	5	10	47	54	−7	23
7	Yuen Long	24	9	3	12	44	48	−4	21
8	Eastern	24	7	4	13	34	62	−28	18
9	Kwong Wah	24	6	5	13	36	49	−13	17
10	Five-One-Seven	24	7	3	14	48	70	−22	17
11	Tung Wah	24	7	3	14	42	63	−21	17
12	Army (R)	24	5	5	14	41	63	−22	15
13	Caroline Hill (R)	24	3	4	17	24	79	−55	10

Source: rsssf.com
(C) Champions; (R) Relegated
