= 1975–76 Hong Kong First Division League =

Hong Kong First Division
- Season: 1975–76
- Champions: South China
- Relegated: Police; HKFC
- Matches played: 132
- Goals scored: 392 (2.97 per match)

The 1975–76 Hong Kong First Division League season was the 65th since its establishment.

== League table ==
Pos	Team	Pld	W	D	L	GF	GA	GD	Pts
1	South China (C)	22	13	5	4	45	19	+26	31
2	Seiko	22	13	4	5	46	22	+24	30
3	Rangers	22	12	6	4	45	28	+17	30
4	Urban Services	22	11	8	3	33	20	+13	30
5	Happy Valley	22	9	7	6	49	30	+19	25
6	Tung Sing	22	8	8	6	29	29	0	24
7	Kwong Wah	22	9	5	8	32	24	+8	23
8	Caroline Hill	22	7	6	9	26	32	−6	20
9	Yuen Long	22	7	5	10	27	35	−8	19
10	Eastern	22	5	3	14	21	49	−28	13
11	Police (R)	22	3	7	12	18	47	−29	13
12	HKFC (R)	22	1	4	17	21	57	−36	6

Source: rsssf.com
(C) Champions; (R) Relegated
