= 2001–02 Hong Kong First Division League =

Hong Kong First Division
- Season: 2001–02
- Champions: Sun Hei
- Matches played: 42
- Goals scored: 164 (3.9 per match)
- Top goalscorer: Cornelius Udebuluzor (Buler Rangers)

The 2001–02 Hong Kong First Division League season was the 91st since its establishment.

== Teams ==
- Buler Rangers (Originally Rangers, branded due to sponsorship from Buler Watch)
- Double Flower (Renamed from Instant-Dict after the end of sponsorship)
- Happy Valley (Defending Champion)
- HKFC (Promoted from Second Division)
- South China
- Sun Hei
- Xiangxue Pharmaceutical (Team admitted from China)

== League table ==
Pos	Team	Pld	W	D	L	GF	GA	GD	Pts
1	Sun Hei (C)	12	8	3	1	27	13	+14	27
2	Happy Valley	12	8	2	2	38	11	+27	26
3	South China	12	7	3	2	27	9	+18	24
4	Buler Rangers	12	4	2	6	28	21	+7	14
5	Double Flower	12	4	1	7	15	28	−13	13
6	Xiangxue Pharmaceutical	12	2	4	6	18	33	−15	10
7	HKFC	12	1	1	10	11	46	−35	4 (Note: Relegated to Second Division by rules, but retained in the First Division)

Source: www.rsssf.com
(C) Champions
