= 1959–60 Hong Kong First Division League =

Hong Kong First Division
- Season: 1959–60
- Champions: South China
- Relegated: China Motor Bus; Chinese Athletic Association
- Matches played: 132
- Goals scored: 569 (4.31 per match)

The 1959–60 Hong Kong First Division League season was the 49th since its establishment.

== League table ==
Pos	Team	Pld	W	D	L	GF	GA	GD	Pts
1	South China (C)	22	16	3	3	72	23	+49	35
2	Happy Valley	22	13	4	5	53	38	+15	30
3	Tung Wah	22	13	4	5	47	26	+21	30
4	KMB	22	12	4	6	54	28	+26	28
5	Eastern	22	11	6	5	38	32	+6	28
6	Kitchee	22	12	3	7	69	32	+37	27
7	Sing Tao	22	8	2	12	42	54	−12	18
8	Kwong Wah	22	6	5	11	41	48	−7	17
9	Police	22	8	1	13	51	75	−24	17
10	China Motor Bus (R)	22	5	7	10	36	63	−27	17
11	Army	22	6	2	14	49	52	−3	14
12	Chinese Athletic Association (R)	22	1	1	20	17	98	−81	3

Source: rsssf.com
(C) Champions; (R) Relegated
