= 2003–04 Hong Kong First Division League =

Hong Kong First Division
- Season: 2003–04
- Champions: Sun Hei
- Relegated: Fire Services
- Matches played: 90
- Goals scored: 283 (3.14 per match)
- Top goalscorer: Keith Gumbs (Happy Valley)

The 2003–04 Hong Kong First Division League season was the 92nd since its establishment.

== League table ==
Pos	Team	Pld	W	D	L	GF	GA	GD	Pts
1	Sun Hei (C)	18	14	2	2	47	18	+29	44
2	Kitchee	18	14	0	4	43	19	+24	42
3	Happy Valley	18	12	2	4	42	23	+19	38
4	Buler Rangers	18	9	0	9	32	28	+4	27
5	Xiangxue Pharmaceutical	18	6	4	8	28	26	+2	22
6	Nancheng Real Estate (W)	18	5	5	8	25	31	−6	20 (Note: Nancheng Real Estate withdrew after the season.)
7	South China	18	5	5	8	21	28	−7	20
8	Fukien	18	5	3	10	17	31	−14	18
9	Sunray Cave	18	3	6	9	14	32	−18	15
10	Fire Services (R)	18	1	3	14	14	53	−39	6

Source: www.rsssf.com Hongkong 2003/04
(C) Champions; (R) Relegated; (W) Withdrew
