= 1997–98 Hong Kong First Division League =

Hong Kong First Division
- Season: 1997–98
- Champions: Instant-Dict
- Relegated: Five-One-Seven
- Matches: 56
- Goals: 185 (3.3 per match)

The 1997–98 Hong Kong First Division League season was the 87th since its establishment. The season began on 7 September 1997 and ended on 16 April 1998.

== First stage ==
Pos	Team	Pld	W	D	L	GF	GA	GD	Pts	Qualification or relegation
1	Instant-Dict	14	11	2	1	42	15	+27	35	To Grand Final
2	Happy Valley	14	9	2	3	34	15	+19	29	Championship Playoff
3	Sing Tao	14	8	2	4	28	12	+16	26	Championship Playoff
4	South China	14	8	2	4	30	25	+5	26	Championship Playoff
5	Yee Hope	14	4	3	7	13	18	−5	15	Relegation Playoff
6	Rangers	14	4	3	7	14	23	−9	15	Relegation Playoff
7	Golden	14	3	2	9	15	24	−9	11	Relegation Playoff
8	Five-One-Seven	14	1	0	13	9	53	−44	3	Relegation Playoff

Source: rsssf.com

== Second stage ==
NB: Teams take points and goals halved from first phase. GF and GA is rounded.

=== Championship playoff ===
Pos	Team	Pld	W	D	L	GF	GA	GD	Pts	Qualification
1	Instant-Dict	6	3	0	3	33	18	+15	26.5	To Grand Final
2	South China	6	4	1	1	32	27	+5	26	
3	Happy Valley	6	1	2	3	28	21	+7	19.5	
4	Sing Tao	6	1	3	2	22	17	+5	19	

Source: rsssf.com

=== Relegation playoff ===
Pos	Team	Pld	W	D	L	GF	GA	GD	Pts	Relegation
5	Rangers	6	3	2	1	21	22	−1	18.5	
6	Yee Hope	6	2	3	1	18	18	0	16.5	
7	Golden	6	2	3	1	17	21	−4	14.5	Relegation to Second Division by rules, but retained in the First Division
8	Five-One-Seven	6	0	2	4	12	42	−30	3.5	Relegation to Second Division

Source: rsssf.com

== Final ==
No final was played as Instant-Dict granted the champion in both stages, and automatically became the overall champion. The runner-up in the Champion Playoff, South China, was awarded the overall runners-up.

First Division League 1997–98 winners

2nd title
