= 1982–83 Hong Kong First Division League =

Hong Kong First Division
- Season: 1982–83
- Champions: Seiko
- Relegated: Tsuen Wan
- Matches: 90
- Goals: 245 (2.72 per match)

The 1982–83 season was the 72nd since the establishment of the Hong Kong First Division League.

== League table ==
Pos	Team	Pld	W	D	L	GF	GA	GD	Pts
1	Seiko (C)	18	12	4	2	31	13	+18	28
2	Bulova	18	10	7	1	36	20	+16	27
3	Eastern	18	7	5	6	23	22	+1	19
4	Rangers	18	7	4	7	26	23	+3	18
5	Sea Bee	18	6	5	7	24	28	−4	17
6	Happy Valley	18	5	7	6	18	22	−4	17
7	Tung Sing	18	7	3	8	25	31	−6	17
8	Ryoden (W)	18	5	6	7	27	32	−5	16
9	Tsuen Wan (R)	18	4	4	10	19	25	−6	12
10	South China	18	3	3	12	16	29	−13	9

Source: rsssf.com
(C) Champions; (R) Relegated; (W) Withdrew from the league system after the season
