= 1994–95 Hong Kong First Division League =

Hong Kong First Division
- Season: 1994–95
- Champions: Eastern
- Relegated: Kui Tan; Kitchee
- Matches played: 90
- Goals scored: 258 (2.87 per match)

The 1994–95 Hong Kong First Division League season was the 84th since its establishment.

== League table ==
Pos	Team	Pld	W	D	L	GF	GA	GD	Pts
1	Eastern (C)	18	12	4	2	43	14	+29	40
2	South China	18	11	4	3	35	14	+21	37
3	Golden	18	8	4	6	24	19	+5	28
4	Frankwell	18	8	4	6	22	20	+2	28
5	Rangers	18	7	6	5	23	21	+2	27
6	Happy Valley	18	8	3	7	25	27	−2	27
7	Sing Tao	18	7	2	9	25	30	−5	23
8	Instant Dict	18	5	6	7	27	28	−1	21
9	Kui Tan (R)	18	4	2	12	17	41	−24	14
10	Kitchee (R)	18	1	3	14	17	44	−27	6

Source: rsssf.com
(C) Champions; (R) Relegated
