= 1958–59 Hong Kong First Division League =

Hong Kong First Division
- Season: 1958–59
- Champions: South China
- Relegated: Little Sai Wan; Caroline Hill
- Matches played: 132
- Goals scored: 681 (5.16 per match)

The 1958–59 Hong Kong First Division League season was the 48th since its establishment.

== League table ==
Pos	Team	Pld	W	D	L	GF	GA	GD	Pts
1	South China (C)	22	20	1	1	95	28	+67	41
2	KMB	22	14	6	2	82	32	+50	34
3	Tung Wah	22	14	3	5	52	40	+12	31
4	Police	22	13	2	7	70	48	+22	28
5	Kitchee	22	12	3	7	68	51	+17	27
6	Army	22	9	5	8	63	53	+10	23
7	Sing Tao	22	8	6	8	57	55	+2	22
8	Eastern	22	7	5	10	36	44	−8	19
9	Kwong Wah	22	4	6	12	40	56	−16	14
10	Chinese Athletic Association	22	4	4	14	35	69	−34	12
11	Little Sai Wan (R)	22	3	1	18	41	100	−59	7
12	Caroline Hill (R)	22	1	4	17	42	105	−63	6

Source: rsssf.com
(C) Champions; (R) Relegated
