= 2002–03 Hong Kong First Division League =

Hong Kong First Division
- Season: 2002–03
- Champions: Happy Valley
- Relegated: Double Flower; HKFC
- Matches played: 56
- Goals scored: 190 (3.39 per match)
- Top goalscorer: Keith Gumbs (Happy Valley)

The 2002–03 Hong Kong First Division League season was the 91st since its establishment.

== League table ==
Pos	Team	Pld	W	D	L	GF	GA	GD	Pts
1	Happy Valley (C)	14	9	4	1	42	16	+26	31
2	Sun Hei	14	8	6	0	40	18	+22	30
3	Buler Rangers	14	7	4	3	24	16	+8	25
4	South China	14	7	3	4	28	17	+11	24
5	Xiangxue Pharmaceutical	14	5	2	7	14	19	−5	17
6	Fukien	14	4	2	8	17	33	−16	14
7	Double Flower (R)	14	3	0	11	10	33	−23	9
8	HKFC (R)	14	2	1	11	15	38	−23	7

Source: rsssf.com
(C) Champions; (R) Relegated
