= 1960–61 Hong Kong First Division League =

Hong Kong First Division
- Season: 1960–61
- Champions: South China
- Relegated: Royal Air Force; Auxiliary Fire Services
- Matches played: 156
- Goals scored: 724 (4.64 per match)

The 1960–61 Hong Kong First Division League season was the 50th since its establishment.

== League table ==
Pos	Team	Pld	W	D	L	GF	GA	GD	Pts
1	South China (C)	24	22	1	1	96	19	+77	45
2	Happy Valley	24	14	6	4	78	39	+39	34
3	Tung Wah	24	16	2	6	71	40	+31	34
4	KMB	24	14	4	6	65	46	+19	32
5	Sing Tao	24	14	2	8	57	32	+25	30
6	Police	24	14	1	9	57	44	+13	29
7	Eastern	24	10	2	12	60	56	+4	22
8	Kitchee	24	8	6	10	52	49	+3	22
9	Army	24	8	3	13	47	66	−19	19
10	Kwong Wah	24	8	2	14	48	57	−9	18
11	Caroline Hill	24	3	6	15	32	75	−43	12
12	Royal Air Force (R)	24	4	3	17	31	84	−53	11
13	Auxiliary Fire Services (R)	24	1	2	21	30	117	−87	4

Source: rsssf.com
(C) Champions; (R) Relegated
