= 1978–79 Hong Kong First Division League =

Hong Kong First Division
- Season: 1978–79
- Champions: Seiko
- Relegated: Police; Blake Garden
- Matches played: 132
- Goals scored: 338 (2.56 per match)

The 1978–79 Hong Kong First Division League season was the 68th since its establishment.

== League table ==
Pos	Team	Pld	W	D	L	GF	GA	GD	Pts
1	Seiko (C)	22	19	3	0	60	14	+46	41
2	Happy Valley	22	11	5	6	39	20	+19	27
3	Eastern	22	7	11	4	26	19	+7	25
4	Tung Sing	22	9	6	7	33	29	+4	24
5	Kui Tan	22	8	8	6	24	21	+3	24
6	Urban Services	22	8	7	7	30	31	−1	23
7	Sea Bee	22	6	10	6	24	21	+3	22
8	South China	22	7	5	10	29	34	−5	19
9	Caroline Hill	22	7	5	10	23	35	−12	19
10	Yuen Long	22	5	8	9	23	33	−10	18
11	Police (R)	22	5	5	12	16	36	−20	15
12	Blake Garden (R)	22	0	7	15	11	45	−34	7

Source: rsssf.com
(C) Champions; (R) Relegated
