= 1956–57 Hong Kong First Division League =

Hong Kong First Division
- Season: 1956–57
- Champions: South China
- Relegated: St. Joseph's; Royal Navy
- Matches played: 156
- Goals scored: 801 (5.13 per match)

The 1956–57 Hong Kong First Division League season was the 46th since its establishment.

== League table ==
Pos	Team	Pld	W	D	L	GF	GA	GD	Pts
1	South China (C)	24	21	0	3	126	40	+86	42
2	Kitchee	24	17	4	3	75	36	+39	38
3	KMB	24	17	2	5	90	36	+54	36
4	Eastern	24	16	4	4	70	37	+33	36
5	Army	24	11	6	7	51	43	+8	28
6	Royal Air Force	24	12	3	9	69	40	+29	27
7	Police	24	8	5	11	57	81	−24	21
8	Kwong Wah	24	8	4	12	54	56	−2	20
9	Sing Tao	24	6	6	12	42	56	−14	18
10	Chinese Athletic Association	24	7	3	14	45	71	−26	17
11	HKFC	24	5	6	13	53	82	−29	16
12	St. Joseph's (R)	24	3	5	16	31	92	−61	11
13	Royal Navy (R)	24	1	0	23	38	131	−93	2

Source: rsssf.com
(C) Champions; (R) Relegated
