= 1963–64 Hong Kong First Division League =

Hong Kong First Division
- Season: 1963–64
- Champions: Kitchee
- Relegated: Caroline Hill; Five-One-Seven
- Matches played: 132
- Goals scored: 672 (5.09 per match)

The 1963–64 Hong Kong First Division League season was the 53rd since its establishment.

== League table ==
Pos	Team	Pld	W	D	L	GF	GA	GD	Pts
1	Kitchee (C)	22	17	3	2	108	34	+74	37
2	Happy Valley	22	15	3	4	68	29	+39	33
3	South China	22	13	4	5	74	38	+36	30
4	Kwong Wah	22	13	3	6	55	28	+27	29
5	Tung Wah	22	12	4	6	55	35	+20	28
6	Yuen Long	22	11	4	7	63	49	+14	26
7	KMB	22	9	6	7	62	51	+11	24
8	Police	22	7	6	9	53	58	−5	20
9	Army	22	5	1	16	37	88	−51	11
10	Eastern	22	4	2	16	44	102	−58	10
11	Caroline Hill (R)	22	3	3	16	31	82	−51	9
12	Five-One-Seven (R)	22	2	3	17	26	82	−56	7

Source: rsssf.com
(C) Champions; (R) Relegated
