= 1999–2000 Hong Kong First Division League =

Hong Kong First Division
- Season: 1999–2000
- Champions: South China
- Relegated: Sai Kung
- Matches: 56
- Goals: 182 (3.25 per match)
- Top goalscorer: Leandro (Sai Kung)

The 1999–2000 Hong Kong First Division League season was the 89th since its establishment. The season began on the 7 September 1999 and ended on 20 May 2000.

== Teams ==
- Happy Valley (Defending Champion)
- Instant-Dict
- Kitchee (Promoted from Second Division)
- O&YH Union (Branded O&YH Union due to sponsorship)
- Rangers (Retained in the First Division despite relegated by rules)
- Sai Kung (Renamed from Sai Kung Friends, retained in the First Division despite originally relegated by rules)
- South China
- Sun Hei (Renamed from Golden)

== First stage ==
Pos	Team	Pld	W	D	L	GF	GA	GD	Pts	Qualification
1	Happy Valley	14	11	2	1	24	8	+16	35	To Grand Final
2	South China	14	9	2	3	35	13	+22	29	Championship Playoff
3	O&YH Union	14	7	2	5	28	24	+4	23	Championship Playoff
4	Sun Hei	14	7	1	6	26	24	+2	22	Championship Playoff
5	Sai Kung	14	6	1	7	28	28	0	19	Relegation Playoff
6	Instant-Dict	14	5	2	7	20	20	0	17	Relegation Playoff
7	Kitchee	14	5	2	7	13	21	−8	17	Relegation Playoff
8	Rangers	14	0	0	14	8	44	−36	0	Relegation Playoff

Source: rsssf.com

== Second stage ==
NB: Teams take points and goals halved from first phase. GF and GA is rounded.

=== Championship playoff ===
Pos	Team	Pld	W	D	L	GF	GA	GD	Pts	Qualification
1	South China	6	4	1	1	33	12	+21	27.5	To Grand Final
2	Sun Hei	6	4	1	1	22	20	+2	24	
3	Happy Valley	6	0	3	3	19	19	0	17 (Note: 3 points were deducted for walking off in the match against Sun Hei)	
4	O&YH Union	6	0	3	3	21	18	+3	14.5	

Source: rsssf.com

=== Relegation playoff ===
Pos	Team	Pld	W	D	L	GF	GA	GD	Pts	Relegation
5	Instant-Dict	6	6	0	0	29	13	+16	26.5	
6	Kitchee	6	3	0	3	21	22	−1	20.5	
7	Sai Kung	6	2	0	4	19	24	−5	18.5	Relegated to Second Division
8	Rangers	6	1	0	5	10	42	−32	3	Relegation to Second Division by rules, but retained in the First Division

Source: rsssf.com

== Final ==
20 May 2000

South China	2 – 2 2 – 2 (AET) 4 – 3 (PSO)	Happy Valley
	Report

Hong Kong Stadium, So Kon Po, Hong Kong Island
Attendance: 10,861

First Division League 1999–00 winners

36th title
