= 1996–97 Hong Kong First Division League =

Hong Kong First Division
- Season: 1996–97
- Champions: South China
- Relegated: Eastern
- Matches: 84
- Goals: 280 (3.33 per match)

The 1996–97 Hong Kong First Division League season was the 86th since its establishment. The season began on 7 September 1996 and ended on 8 June 1997.

== First stage ==
Pos	Team	Pld	W	D	L	GF	GA	GD	Pts
1	Instant-Dict (G)	12	10	1	1	36	9	+27	31
2	South China	12	10	1	1	32	16	+16	31
3	Uhlsport Rangers	12	5	0	7	12	18	−6	15
4	Golden	12	5	0	7	20	30	−10	15
5	Sing Tao	12	4	2	6	22	22	0	14
6	Happy Valley	12	3	2	7	17	21	−4	11
7	Eastern (R)	12	1	2	9	10	33	−23	5

(G) Grand Final; (R) Relegated

== Second stage ==
Pos	Team	Pld	W	D	L	GF	GA	GD	Pts
1	South China (G)	12	9	3	0	33	9	+24	30
2	Instant-Dict	12	9	2	1	26	5	+21	29
3	Golden	12	6	2	4	17	17	0	20
4	Happy Valley	12	4	3	5	17	21	−4	15
5	Sing Tao	12	3	3	6	16	19	−3	12
6	Uhlsport Rangers	12	2	2	8	12	33	−21	8
7	Eastern (R)	12	1	1	10	10	27	−17	4

(G) Grand Final; (R) Relegated

== Final ==
8 June 1997

Instant-Dict	2 –2 2 – 3 (AET)	South China
Greer 11'; Foster 40'		Tempest 23'; Cheng Siu Chung 90' 106'

First Division League 1996–97 winners

35th title
