= 1991–92 Hong Kong First Division League =

Hong Kong First Division
- Season: 1991–92
- Champions: South China
- Relegated: HKFC; Police
- Matches played: 90
- Goals scored: 325 (3.61 per match)

The 1991–92 Hong Kong First Division League season was the 81st since its establishment.

== League table ==
Pos	Team	Pld	W	D	L	GF	GA	GD	Pts
1	South China (C)	18	15	1	2	65	13	+52	46
2	Eastern	18	14	3	1	55	12	+43	45
3	Happy Valley	18	11	1	6	47	20	+27	34
4	Sing Tao	18	10	3	5	22	21	+1	33
5	Ernest Borel	18	8	3	7	34	24	+10	27
6	Instant Dict	18	7	4	7	30	21	+9	25
7	Kui Tan	18	5	5	8	23	25	−2	20
8	Michelotti	18	6	1	11	24	45	−21	19
9	HKFC (R)	18	1	2	15	12	52	−40	5
10	Police (R)	18	1	1	16	13	92	−79	4

Source: rsssf.com
(C) Champions; (R) Relegated
