= Bulova SA =

Defunct association football club in Hong Kong

Bulova (Chinese: 寶路華足球隊) was a Hong Kong football club which were dissolved after the 1984–85 season.

In 1977, Bulova entered Hong Kong Third Division League and proposed a three-year plan to get promotion to First Division. In 1979–80 season, Bulova appeared the first time in Hong Kong First Division League.

The team organised many exhibition matches which attracted many spectators. Some of the famous ones include the match against Liverpool in 1983 and against Manchester United in 1984.

They won a double of Hong Kong FA Cup and Hong Kong Viceroy Cup in 1981–82 and 1982–83. They were also runners-up of FA Cup in 1979–80 and won the Hong Kong Senior Shield in 1984. They were also runners-up in the Hong Kong First Division League in 1982–83 and 1983–84.
