= Jardine SA =

Jardine (in Chinese: 怡和, previously known as 渣甸) is a Hong Kong football club who are an associate member of HKFA which does not take part in any division of the league. Jardines quit and re-entered the league twice during the 50s and 70s.

The team first entered Hong Kong Third Division League in 1953 and appeared in First Division for the first time in 1957–58 season. However, the team quit the league the after the season.

== History ==
In 1960–61, the team re-entered the Third Division. They finished runners-up in the Second Division in 1964–65, but gave up the right of promotion. In 1967–68, the team promoted to First Division League again after granting champion in Second Division League.

In 1968, the Hong Kong Football Association initiated Hong Kong to run professional football. Jardine formed a strong team to compete in the league. In 1968–69, the club obtained its first major trophy, Hong Kong Senior Shield. In the following season, the team captured 4 trophies including the league title.

Jardine re-entered again in 1972–73, joining the Hong Kong Third Division, and re-entered the First Division after capturing the 1973–74 Second Division title. The club made their final appearance in the top flight during the 1974–75 season, where they were relegated after finishing second bottom in the table.

The club have held associate member status within the HKFA since 1982.

== Honours ==
=== League ===
- Hong Kong First Division
  - Champions (1): 1969–70
- Hong Kong Second Division
  - Champions (3): 1956–57, 1967–68, 1973-74
  - Runners-up (1): 1964–65

=== Cup ===
- Hong Kong Senior Shield
  - Champions (1): 1968–69
