= Tsuen Wan (football club) =

Tsuen Wan is a football team which is now an associate member of HKFA and does not participate in any division of the existing league. It is different from Tsuen Wan, which participates in the Hong Kong Second Division League.

The team entered the newly formed Third Division League in 1969–70. In the next season, the team was promoted to Second Division and captured the title immediately. In 1971–72, the team played its first First Division League season. It is the second team to be promoted from Third Division to First Division after Yuen Long. However, it was relegated to Second Division again immediately in that season (26 matches played: 7 wins, 7 draws, 12 losses, 21 points).

In 1980–81, the team was promoted to First Division again by finishing in second place in the last season. However, it stayed in the bottom half of the league in the following 3 seasons (8th in 1980–1981, 6th in 1981–1982, 9th in 1982–1983). In 1983, Tsuen Wan rejected HKFA's retention offer and was relegated to the Second Division League.

In 1984–85, the team was promoted to the First Division for the third time after finishing second in the Second Division. Despite finishing at the bottom in that season, Tsuen Wan was retained by HKFA again to stay in the First Division, and the offer was accepted this time. The best league position achieved was 5th place in 1986–87. The team was also a 2 times runner-up for Hong Kong Senior Shield).

The team quit the league due to financial problems in 1989.

== League Position History ==
1969–70: Third Division
1970–71: Champion (Second Division)
1971–72: Relegated (First Division)
1972–73: Second Division
1973–74: Second Division
1974–75: Second Division
1975–76: Second Division
1976–77: Second Division
1977–78: Second Division
1978–79: Second Division
1979–80: 2nd (Second Division)
1980–81: 8th
1981–82: 6th
1982–83: 9th (rejected HKFA's retain offer and relegated to Second Division League)
1983–84: 2nd (Second Division)
1984–85: Last place (retained by HKFA to stay in First Division)
1985–86: 6th
1986–87: 5th (Runners-up for Hong Kong Senior Shield and Viceroy Cup)
1987–88: 7th (Runners-up for Hong Kong Senior Shield and Hong Kong FA Cup)
1988–89: 7th

== Notable players ==
- (England) Chris Galvin (加雲) (1981–83)
- (England) Terry Lees (1982)
- (England) Stuart Parker (柏克) (1981–82)
- (Wales) Dave Roberts (羅拔士) (1981–83)
