= 2025–26 in Hong Kong football =

Football events in Hong Kong

Football in Hong Kong
- Season: 2025–26

This article summarises Hong Kong football in the 2025–26 season.

== National teams ==
Source: HKFA

=== Men's ===
==== Senior ====
31 March 2027 ACQ R3	India	2–1	Hong Kong	Kochi, India
19:00 UTC+5:30	Williams 4'; Mishra 50'	Report; Report (AFC)	Camargo 65'	Stadium: Jawaharlal Nehru International Stadium; Attendance: 22,690; Referee: Songkran Bunmeekiart (Thailand)

5 June Friendly	Hong Kong	2–0	Mongolia	So Kon Po, Hong Kong
20:00 UTC+8	Juninho 5'; Ng Yu Hei 81'	Report		Stadium: Hong Kong Stadium; Attendance: 6,016; Referee: Hoàng Ngọc Hà (Vietnam)

9 June Friendly	Cambodia	2–0	Hong Kong	Phnom Penh, Cambodia
19:00 UTC+7	Ogawa 45+1'; Chanthea 50'	Report		Stadium: Olympic Stadium; Attendance: 20,685; Referee: Yudi Nurcahya (Indonesia)

27 September 2026 FIFA ASEAN Cup Division 2 Group A	Hong Kong	4–0	Laos	Kai Tak, Hong Kong
15:00 UTC+8	Sun Ming Him 12'; Camargo 33'; Dudu 55'; Orr 90+1' (pen.)	FIFA Report; GSA Report		Stadium: Kai Tak Stadium; Attendance: 18,873; Referee: Sanzhar Zhakypbekov (Kyrgyzstan)

30 September 2026 FIFA ASEAN Cup Division 2 Group A	Hong Kong	v	Brunei	Kai Tak, Hong Kong
20:00 UTC+8				Stadium: Kai Tak Stadium

==== U-23 ====
12 June Friendly	China	4–0	Hong Kong	China
16:00 UTC+8

15 June Friendly	China	3–0	Hong Kong	China
16:00 UTC+8

16 September 2026 Asian Games GS	Japan	2–0	Hong Kong	Toyota, Japan
19:30 UTC+9	Hisatsugu Ishii 39'; Shuto Nagano 89'	Report		Stadium: Toyota Stadium; Attendance: 7,720; Referee: Tuan Yaasin (Malaysia)

20 September 2026 Asian Games GS	Hong Kong	1–5	Thailand	Toyota, Japan
16:00 UTC+9	Wu Chun Ming 14'	Report	Thanakrit 39'; Paripan 54'; Tsang Yi Hang 56' (o.g.); Jehhanafee 76'; Worawut 84'	Stadium: Toyota Stadium; Attendance: 10,439; Referee: Hanna Hattab (Syria)

23 September 2026 Asian Games GS	Kyrgyzstan	4–0	Hong Kong	Kariya, Japan
19:30 UTC+9				Stadium: Wave Stadium Kariya; Attendance: 1,187

==== U-20 ====
4 July Friendly	Myanmar	2–0	Hong Kong	Yangon, Myanmar
16:00 UTC+6:30				Stadium: Thuwunna Stadium

7 July Friendly	Myanmar	2–0	Hong Kong	Yangon, Myanmar
16:00 UTC+6:30				Stadium: Thuwunna Stadium

31 August 2027 AFC U-20 ACQ	Saudi Arabia	2–0	Hong Kong	Doha, Qatar
19:00 UTC+3	Suhayb 26'; Al Obeidi 45+1' (pen.)	Report		Stadium: Suheim bin Hamad Stadium; Referee: Ammar Abo Alo (Syria)

3 September 2027 AFC U-20 ACQ	Hong Kong	0–3	Qatar	Doha, Qatar
19:00 UTC+3		Report	Al Sayed 10'; Ali 17'; Mohamed 45+1'	Stadium: Abdullah bin Khalifa Stadium; Referee: Ngô Duy Lân (Vietnam)

6 September 2027 AFC U-20 ACQ	Oman	1–1	Hong Kong	Doha, Qatar
19:00 UTC+3	Al Alawi 84'	Report	Cheung Yiu Hin 58'	Stadium: Suheim bin Hamad Stadium; Referee: Seyed Vahid Kazemi (Iran)

==== U-17 ====
8 November 2027 AFC U-17 ACQ	Hong Kong	v	Iraq	Buriram, Thailand
--:-- UTC+7				Stadium: Buriram Stadium

11 November 2027 AFC U-17 ACQ	Maldives	v	Hong Kong	Buriram, Thailand
--:-- UTC+7				Stadium: Buriram Stadium

17 November 2027 AFC U-17 ACQ	Hong Kong	v	Thailand	Buriram, Thailand
--:-- UTC+7				Stadium: Buriram Stadium

20 November 2027 AFC U-17 ACQ	Chinese Taipei	v	Hong Kong	Buriram, Thailand
--:-- UTC+7				Stadium: Buriram Stadium

==== U-16 ====
3 July Asia International Youth Soccer	Hong Kong	3–1	(Japan) Tottori Select U-16	Tottori, Japan
16:00 UTC+9				Stadium: DoraDoraPark Football Stadium

4 July Asia International Youth Soccer	Hong Kong	3–1	(South Korea) Munseong H.S. U-16	Tottori, Japan
16:00 UTC+9				Stadium: DoraDoraPark Athletic Stadium

5 July Asia International Youth Soccer	Hong Kong	1–0	(Japan) Gainare Tottori U-16	Tottori, Japan
17:30 UTC+9				Stadium: All Gainare Yajin Stadium

16 August Friendly	Hong Kong	2–2 (5–4 p)	(England) Man Utd U-16	Mong Kok, Hong Kong
18:00 UTC+8				Stadium: Mong Kok Stadium; Attendance: 4,435

=== Women's ===
==== Senior ====
26 February 2026 Pink Ladies Cup	Ghana	4–0	Hong Kong	Al Hamriyah, UAE
16:00 UTC+4	Princess 28'; Boaduwaa 40'; Boye-Hlorkah 47'; Zakaria 87'	Report		Stadium: Al Hamriya Sports Club Stadium; Attendance: 1,000; Referee: Rawdha Almansoori (United Arab Emirates)

3 March 2026 Pink Ladies Cup	Hong Kong	Cancelled	Tanzania	Al Hamriyah, UAE
21:00 UTC+4				Stadium: Al Hamriya Sports Club Stadium

6 March 2026 Pink Ladies Cup	Hong Kong	Cancelled	Russia	Al Hamriyah, UAE
16:00 UTC+4				Stadium: Al Hamriya Sports Club Stadium

3 June Closed Door Friendly	Hong Kong	3–2	Fiji	Tseung Kwan O, Hong Kong
--:-- UTC+8	Chan Yee Hing 10'; Li Hau Yi 50'; Leung Kwong Kit 60'	Report	Leba 70'; Tabunase 80'	Stadium: Jockey Club HKFA Football Training Centre; Attendance: 0

6 June Friendly	Hong Kong	3–1	Fiji	Kowloon, Hong Kong
18:00 UTC+8	Cheung Wai Ki 34'; Leung H.K. 39'; Wei Lan 75'	Report	Naweni 23'	Stadium: Kai Tak Youth Sports Ground; Attendance: 1,261

14 September 2026 Asian Games GS	China	5–1	Hong Kong	Gifu, Japan
19:00 UTC+9	Chen Qiaozhu 14'; Si Yu 38'; Wang Yanwen 48'; Wang Shuang 80', 89'	Report	Cheung Wai Ki 31'	Stadium: Gifu Nagaragawa Stadium; Attendance: 179; Referee: Khin Nyein Chan (Myanmar)

17 September 2026 Asian Games GS	Hong Kong	0–2	Philippines	Gifu, Japan
19:00 UTC+9		Report	Leach 12' Ramirez 63'	Stadium: Gifu Nagaragawa Stadium

21 September 2026 Asian Games GS	Uzbekistan	2–1	Hong Kong	Kariya, Japan
16:00 UTC+9	Khabibullaeva 34'; Shoyimova 90+2'	Report	Wei Lan 65'	Stadium: Wave Stadium Kariya; Attendance: 561; Referee: Park Se-jin (South Korea)

==== U-20 ====
26 February 2026 Pink Ladies Cup	Ghana	4–0	Hong Kong	Al Hamriyah, UAE
16:00 UTC+4	Princess 28'; Boaduwaa 40'; Boye-Hlorkah 47'; Zakaria 87'	Report		Stadium: Al Hamriya Sports Club Stadium; Attendance: 1,000; Referee: Rawdha Almansoori (United Arab Emirates)

3 March 2026 Pink Ladies Cup	Hong Kong	Cancelled	Tanzania	Al Hamriyah, UAE
21:00 UTC+4				Stadium: Al Hamriya Sports Club Stadium

6 March 2026 Pink Ladies Cup	Hong Kong	Cancelled	Russia	Al Hamriyah, UAE
16:00 UTC+4				Stadium: Al Hamriya Sports Club Stadium

3 June Closed Door Friendly	Hong Kong	3–2	Fiji	Tseung Kwan O, Hong Kong
--:-- UTC+8	Chan Yee Hing 10'; Li Hau Yi 50'; Leung Kwong Kit 60'	Report	Leba 70'; Tabunase 80'	Stadium: Jockey Club HKFA Football Training Centre; Attendance: 0

6 June Friendly	Hong Kong	3–1	Fiji	Kowloon, Hong Kong
18:00 UTC+8	Cheung Wai Ki 34'; Leung H.K. 39'; Wei Lan 75'	Report	Naweni 23'	Stadium: Kai Tak Youth Sports Ground; Attendance: 1,261

14 September 2026 Asian Games GS	China	5–1	Hong Kong	Gifu, Japan
19:00 UTC+9	Chen Qiaozhu 14'; Si Yu 38'; Wang Yanwen 48'; Wang Shuang 80', 89'	Report	Cheung Wai Ki 31'	Stadium: Gifu Nagaragawa Stadium; Attendance: 179; Referee: Khin Nyein Chan (Myanmar)

17 September 2026 Asian Games GS	Hong Kong	0–2	Philippines	Gifu, Japan
19:00 UTC+9		Report	Leach 12' Ramirez 63'	Stadium: Gifu Nagaragawa Stadium

21 September 2026 Asian Games GS	Uzbekistan	2–1	Hong Kong	Kariya, Japan
16:00 UTC+9	Khabibullaeva 34'; Shoyimova 90+2'	Report	Wei Lan 65'	Stadium: Wave Stadium Kariya; Attendance: 561; Referee: Park Se-jin (South Korea)

==== U-17 ====
14 August Srikandi Merdeka Cup 2026 GS	Hong Kong	0–0	Malaysia	Kudus, Indonesia
16:00 UTC+7				Stadium: Supersoccer Arena

16 August Srikandi Merdeka Cup 2026 GS	Saudi Arabia	0–7	Hong Kong	Kudus, Indonesia
15:00 UTC+7				Stadium: Supersoccer Arena

18 August Srikandi Merdeka Cup 2026 GS	Indonesia	1–0	Hong Kong	Kudus, Indonesia
20:00 UTC+7				Stadium: Supersoccer Arena

8 October 2027 AFC U-17 WACQ	Hong Kong	v	Guam	Yangon, Myanmar
16:00 UTC+6:30				Stadium: Thuwunna Stadium

11 October 2027 AFC U-17 WACQ	Myanmar	v	Hong Kong	Yangon, Myanmar
16:00 UTC+6:30				Stadium: Thuwunna Stadium

== Club competitions ==
=== League (men) ===
==== Hong Kong Premier League ====
Pos	Team	Pld	W	D	L	GF	GA	GD	Pts	Qualification or relegation (Note: Teams play each other twice (18 matches), before the league is split into two groups (the top five and the bottom five).)
1	Kitchee (C)	22	16	4	2	54	28	+26	52	Qualification for AFC Champions League Two group stage
2	Tai Po	22	13	4	5	49	32	+17	43	Qualification for AFC Champions League Two group stage (Note: Tai Po qualified for the AFC Champions League Two group stage as the 2025–26 Hong Kong FA Cup winners.)
3	Lee Man	22	12	6	4	57	26	+31	42	
4	Eastern	22	9	5	8	39	37	+2	32 (Note: Head-to-head points: Eastern 6, North District 3)	
5	North District	22	8	8	6	43	39	+4	32	
6	Kowloon City	22	8	4	10	28	39	−11	28	
7	Southern	22	7	4	11	28	35	−7	25	
8	Eastern District	22	5	6	11	20	22	−2	21 (Note: Head-to-head points: Eastern District 7, Rangers 1)	
9	Rangers	22	6	3	13	26	44	−18	21	
10	HKFC	22	3	2	17	18	60	−42	11	

Source: Hong Kong Football Association
Rules for classification: 1) Points; 2) Head-to-head points; 3) Head-to-head goal difference; 4) Head-to-head goals scored; 5) Goal difference; 6) Goals scored; 7) Fair-play points; 8) Drawing lots (Play-off if the winner has to be decided).
(C) Champions

==== Hong Kong First Division League ====
Pos	Team	Pld	W	D	L	GF	GA	GD	Pts	Promotion or relegation
1	Supreme FC (C)	26	23	2	1	106	28	+78	71	
2	WSE	26	21	3	2	102	21	+81	66	
3	South China	26	17	4	5	60	22	+38	55	
4	Sham Shui Po	26	14	4	8	45	38	+7	46	
5	Tung Sing	26	13	4	9	47	33	+14	43	
6	Hoi King	26	12	5	9	52	50	+2	41	
7	Central & Western	26	12	3	11	60	44	+16	39	
8	Yuen Long	26	11	5	10	47	48	−1	38	
9	Sha Tin (P)	26	10	5	11	45	45	0	35	Promotion to the Premier League
10	Resources Capital	26	9	7	10	46	42	+4	34	
11	Bright Cerulean	26	5	4	17	31	76	−45	19	
12	Citizen	26	4	2	20	39	81	−42	14	
13	Lucky Mile	26	3	2	21	24	106	−82	11	
14	Kwun Tong (R)	26	1	2	23	21	91	−70	5	Relegation to the Second Division

Updated to match(es) played on 17 May 2026. Source: Hong Kong Football Association
Rules for classification: 1) Points; 2) Head-to-head points; 3) Head-to-head goal difference; 4) Head-to-head goals scored; 5) Goal difference; 6) Goals scored; 7) Fair-play points; 8) Drawing lots
(C) Champions; (P) Promoted; (R) Relegated

==== Hong Kong Second Division League ====
Pos	Team	Pld	W	D	L	GF	GA	GD	Pts	Promotion or relegation
1	Kui Tan	15	14	1	0	67	5	+62	43	Qualification for the Championship round
2	Leaper	15	10	4	1	42	12	+30	34	Qualification for the Championship round
3	Sui Tung	15	10	3	2	27	14	+13	33	Qualification for the Championship round
4	Kwai Tsing	15	9	3	3	35	20	+15	30	Qualification for the Championship round
5	Wing Yee	15	9	3	3	34	17	+17	30	Qualification for the Championship round
6	Wan Chai	15	9	0	6	37	21	+16	27	Qualification for the Championship round
7	Yau Tsim Mong	15	7	1	7	24	28	−4	22	Qualification for the Championship round
8	Gospel	15	7	1	7	26	27	−1	22	Qualification for the Championship round
9	Fukien	15	5	6	4	18	17	+1	21	Qualification for the Relegation round
10	Wong Tai Sin	15	4	8	3	19	16	+3	20	Qualification for the Relegation round
11	Kwong Wah	15	5	1	9	20	43	−23	16	Qualification for the Relegation round
12	Kowloon Cricket Club	15	4	2	9	25	25	0	14	Qualification for the Relegation round
13	Tuen Mun	15	4	0	11	41	33	+8	12	Qualification for the Relegation round
14	Tsuen Wan	15	1	3	11	12	37	−25	6	Qualification for the Relegation round
15	Mutual	15	1	2	12	8	34	−26	5	Qualification for the Relegation round
16	Fu Moon	15	1	2	12	11	97	−86	5	Qualification for the Relegation round

Updated to match(es) played on 8 February 2026. Source: Hong Kong Football Association
Rules for classification: 1) Points; 2) Head-to-head points; 3) Head-to-head goal difference; 4) Head-to-head goals scored; 5) Goal difference; 6) Goals scored; 7) Fair-play points; 8) Drawing lots

==== Hong Kong Third Division League ====
Pos	Team	Pld	W	D	L	GF	GA	GD	Pts	Promotion or relegation
1	Sun Hei	15	14	1	0	52	9	+43	43	Qualification for the Championship round
2	Double Flower	15	12	1	2	35	12	+23	37	Qualification for the Championship round
3	Tsun Tat	15	8	6	1	31	16	+15	30	Qualification for the Championship round
4	Ravia	15	8	2	5	44	17	+27	26	Qualification for the Championship round
5	Qi Yi	15	7	3	5	23	26	−3	24	Qualification for the Championship round
6	Tuen Mun FC	15	7	2	6	25	22	+3	23	Qualification for the Championship round
7	KCDRSC	15	5	6	4	19	20	−1	21	Qualification for the Championship round
8	Sai Kung	15	6	2	7	28	28	0	20	Qualification for the Championship round
9	Ornament	15	5	4	6	33	33	0	19	Qualification for the Relegation round
10	St. Joseph's	15	5	4	6	24	26	−2	19	Qualification for the Relegation round
11	Ling Yui Orion	15	5	2	8	27	38	−11	17	Qualification for the Relegation round
12	CityLinkers SW	15	4	2	9	18	39	−21	14	Qualification for the Relegation round
13	Islands	15	4	2	9	20	23	−3	14	Qualification for the Relegation round
14	Konter	15	3	3	9	21	40	−19	12	Qualification for the Relegation round
15	Wui Hong Sports Centre	15	2	2	11	14	44	−30	8	Qualification for the Relegation round
16	Chandler Lambert	15	2	2	11	10	37	−27	8	Qualification for the Relegation round

Updated to match(es) played on 11 January 2026. Source: Hong Kong Football Association

=== First round ===
3 September 2025	Kowloon City	2–1 (a.e.t.)	Eastern District	Mong Kok Stadium
20:00	Park Min-gyu 11'; Jadson 102'	Report	Hélio 39'	Attendance: 510; Referee: Wong Po Sing

10 September 2025	Tai Po	3–1	Southern	Mong Kok Stadium
20:00	Valverde 37', 73' (pen.); Temelkovski 88'	Report	Acosta 84'	Attendance: 633; Referee: Wong Wai Lun

=== Quarter-finals ===
27 September 2025	Eastern	3–0	HKFC	Tai Po Sports Ground
15:00	Okubo 81' (pen.), 84', 87'	Report		Attendance: 226; Referee: Luk Kin Sun

27 September 2025	Lee Man	2–2 (1–3 p)	Tai Po	Mong Kok Stadium
18:30	Everton 61'; Baffoe 65'	Report	Temelkovski 13'; Sartori 45'	Attendance: 1,626; Referee: Poon Chun Kit
	Penalties
	Mikael (penalty missed); Braunshtain (penalty scored); Tachibana (penalty missed); Baffoe (penalty missed)		Fernando (penalty scored); Renner (penalty scored); Chan Siu Kwan (penalty missed); Dujardin (penalty missed); Cividini (penalty scored)

28 September 2025	Rangers	4–0	Kowloon City	North District Sports Ground
15:00	Panigazzi 6', 65'; Lau Chi Lok 45+3', 87'	Report		Attendance: 284; Referee: Yu Kin Fung

28 September 2025	Kitchee	2–3	North District	Tsing Yi Sports Ground
18:30	Revilla 45', 45+4' (pen.)	Report	Vinicius 40'; Gudula 80' (pen.); Granada 82'	Attendance: 451; Referee: Wong Wai Lun

=== Semi-finals ===
7 February 2026	North District	2–3	Tai Po	Mong Kok Stadium
15:00	Arboleda 6'; Páez 32'	Report	Páez 35' (o.g.); Paulinho 74', 80'	Attendance: 1,603; Referee: Yu Kin Fung

8 February 2026	Eastern	1–3	Rangers	Mong Kok Stadium
15:00	Okubo 37' (pen.)	Report	Ibrahim 26'; Cortés 30'; Lau Chi Lok 78'	Attendance: 982; Referee: Wong Wai Lun

=== Final ===
18 February 2026	Tai Po	4–1 (a.e.t.)	Rangers	Mong Kok Stadium
15:00	R. Dujardin 13'; Paulinho 103'; Renner 113', 119'	Report	Ibrahim 64'	Attendance: 4,738; Referee: Ho Wai Sing

=== First round ===
20 December 2025	Lee Man	3–0	Kowloon City	Tsing Yi Sports Ground
15:00	Mikael 31' (pen.); Tursunov 42'; Everton 70'	Report		Attendance: 582; Referee: Poon Chun Kit

21 December 2025	Southern	1–3	North District	Tsing Yi Sports Ground
15:00	Vinicius 4'	Report	Granada 72', 80' (pen.); Gudula 88'	Attendance: 515; Referee: Tam Ping Wun

=== Quarter-finals ===
7 March 2026	Eastern	0–0 (3–4 p)	Eastern District	Tsing Yi Sports Ground
15:00		Report		Attendance: 442; Referee: Poon Chun Kit
	Penalties
	Okubo (penalty scored); Bleda (penalty missed); Lorenz (penalty scored); Hall (penalty scored); Yiu Ho Ming (penalty missed)		Gu Bin (penalty scored); Bruno Luiz (penalty scored); Takatori (penalty scored); Li Ngai Hoi (penalty missed); Chang Hei Yin (penalty scored)

7 March 2026	Tai Po	1–1 (6–5 p)	Kitchee	Mong Kok Stadium
18:30	Fernando 10'	Report	Revilla 33'	Attendance: 1,948; Referee: Luk Kin Sun
	Penalties
	Paulinho (penalty scored); Lee Ka Ho (penalty scored); Renner (penalty missed); Chung Wai Keung (penalty scored); Marcão (penalty scored); Law Chun Ting (penalty scored); Mikael (penalty scored)		Kendy (penalty scored); Dantas (penalty scored); Revilla (penalty scored); Beattie (penalty scored); Haddow (penalty missed); Mingazow (penalty scored); Wong Ho Chun (penalty missed)

8 March 2026	Rangers	3–3 (3–1 p)	Lee Man	Sham Shui Po Sports Ground
15:00	Cortés 40'; Lau Chi Lok 88' (pen.); Cheng Tsz Sum 90+6'	Report	Gigauri 25'; Lau Yin Hong 28' (o.g.); Mikael 72'	Attendance: 619; Referee: Ho Wai Sing
	Penalties
	Lau Chi Lok (penalty scored); Cortés (penalty scored); Panigazzi (penalty scored)		Willian (penalty scored); Dudu (penalty missed); Mikael (penalty missed); Lau Ka Kiu (penalty missed)

8 March 2026	HKFC	1–3	North District	Tsing Yi Sports Ground
18:30	Kranick 62'	Report	Granada 13', 42'; Lo Kong Wai 47'	Attendance: 188; Referee: Tang Hing Fu

=== Semi-finals ===
23 May 2026	Tai Po	2–0	Rangers	Mong Kok Stadium
15:00	Valverde 51'; Sartori 69' (pen.)	Report		Attendance: 1,583; Referee: Liu Kwok Man

24 May 2026	Eastern District	2–2 (a.e.t.) (3–1 p)	North District	Mong Kok Stadium
15:00	Léo 32'; Luiz 45+2'	Report	Gudula 43'; Granada 70' (pen.)	Attendance: 1,443; Referee: Luk Kin Sun
	Penalties
	Na Yun-ho (penalty missed); Takatori (penalty scored); Bianconi (penalty scored); Yuel (penalty scored)		Granada (penalty scored); Gudula (penalty missed); Vinicius (penalty missed); Arboleda (penalty missed)

=== Final ===
30 May 2026	Tai Po	2–1	Eastern District	Mong Kok Stadium
15:00	Chan Siu Kwan 14', 45+2'	Report	Yuel 88' (pen.)	Attendance: 3,506; Referee: Tam Ping Wun

=== First Round ===
6 September 2025	Tai Po	3–1	Eastern	Tsing Yi Sports Ground
16:00	Temelkovski 50', 90+2'; Sartori 54' (pen.)	Report	Okubo 38' (pen.)	Attendance: 705; Referee: Poon Chun Kit

4 October 2025	Southern	1–4	Eastern District	Tai Po Sports Ground
15:00	Acosta 29'	Report	Andrić 46'; Manzoki 70'; Takatori 79'; Razeek 90+5'	Attendance: 272; Referee: Wong Wai Lun

=== Quarter-finals ===
11 October 2025	Kitchee	3–0	Rangers	Mong Kok Stadium
15:00	Kanda 47'; Kendy 76'; Kim Shin-wook 90+2'	Report		Attendance: 1,035; Referee: Poon Chun Kit

12 October 2025	Kowloon City	2–1	Eastern District	Hammer Hill Road Sports Ground
15:00	Kessi 29'; Kayron 64'	Report	Léo 90+5'	Attendance: 406; Referee: Tang Hing Fu

15 November 2025	HKFC	0–3	Tai Po	Mong Kok Stadium
15:00		Report	Valverde 15'; Paulinho 42'; Pérez-Doyle 67' (o.g.)	Attendance: 404; Referee: Poon Chun Kit

16 November 2026	North District	1–2 (a.e.t.)	Lee Man	Hammer Hill Road Sports Ground
15:00	Abadía 36'	Report	Tursunov 52'; Poon Pui Hin 103'	Attendance: 482; Referee: Liu Kwok Man

=== Semi-finals ===
11 March 2026	Lee Man	1–0	Tai Po	Mong Kok Stadium
20:00	Gigauri 62'	Report		Attendance: 1,261; Referee: Tang Hing Fu

18 March 2026	Kitchee	1–0	Kowloon City	Mong Kok Stadium
20:00	Martínez 34' (pen.)	Report		Attendance: 779; Referee: Poon Chun Kit

=== Final ===
7 April 2026	Kitchee	1–2	Lee Man	Mong Kok Stadium
15:00	Illarramendi 63'	Report	Everton 49'; Baffoe 58'	Attendance: 3,770; Referee: Tam Ping Wun

==== AFC Champions League Two ====
===== Group E =====
Pos	Team	Pld	W	D	L	GF	GA	GD	Pts	Qualification	MAC	HNP	TPF	BJG
1	(Australia) Macarthur FC	6	4	1	1	11	6	+5	13	Advance to round of 16	—	2–1	2–1	3–0
2	(Vietnam) Công An Hà Nội	6	2	2	2	9	7	+2	8	Advance to round of 16	1–1	—	3–0	2–1
3	(Hong Kong) Tai Po	6	2	1	3	7	12	−5	7		2–1	1–0	—	3–3
4	(China) Beijing Guoan	6	1	2	3	10	12	−2	5		1–2	2–2	3–0	—

Source: ACL2
Rules for classification: Tiebreakers
18 September 2025
18:00 UTC+8

Tai Po (Hong Kong)	2–1	(Australia) Macarthur
Cividini 3'; Renner 66'	Report	Temelkovski 70' (o.g.)

Mong Kok Stadium, Hong Kong
Attendance: 1,875
Referee: Ahmad Alaeddin (Lebanon)
18 September 2025
20:15 UTC+8

Beijing Guoan (China)	2–2	(Vietnam) Công An Hà Nội
Chi Zhongguo 49'; Zhang Yuan 65'	Report	Vitão 15'; China 73'

Workers' Stadium, Beijing
Attendance: 20,071
Referee: Wiwat Jumpao-on (Thailand)

2 October 2025
17:45 UTC+10

Macarthur (Australia)	3–0	(China) Beijing Guoan
Ikonomidis 4'; Uskok 59'; Gržan 89'	Report

Campbelltown Sports Stadium, Sydney
Attendance: 2,960
Referee: Mohammed Al-Shammari (Qatar)
2 October 2025
19:15 UTC+7

Công An Hà Nội (Vietnam)	3–0	(Hong Kong) Tai Po
China 27', 33'; Phan Văn Đức 88'	Report

Hàng Đẫy Stadium, Hanoi
Attendance: 5,179
Referee: Mohamed Khaled (Bahrain)

23 October 2025
18:00 UTC+8

Tai Po (Hong Kong)	3–3	(China) Beijing Guoan
Renner 17', 90'; Temelkovski 29'	Report	Bai Yang 36'; Ngadeu-Ngadjui 53'; Abreu 83'

Mong Kok Stadium, Hong Kong
Attendance: 3,324
Referee: Sashanka Madushanka (Sri Lanka)
23 October 2025
19:15 UTC+7

Công An Hà Nội (Vietnam)	1–1	(Australia) Macarthur
Lê Văn Đô 30'	Report	Uskok 77'

Hàng Đẫy Stadium, Hanoi
Attendance: 4,169
Referee: Hanna Hattab (Syria)

6 November 2025
18:45 UTC+11

Macarthur (Australia)	2–1	(Vietnam) Công An Hà Nội
Gržan 20'; Caceres 75'	Report	Adou 30'

Campbelltown Sports Stadium, Sydney
Attendance: 2,889
Referee: Clifford Daypuyat (Philippines)
6 November 2025
20:15 UTC+8

Beijing Guoan (China)	3–0	(Hong Kong) Tai Po
Zhang Yuning 46'; Serginho 85', 90+6'	Report

Workers' Stadium, Beijing
Attendance: 21,371
Referee: Mahmood Al-Majarafi (Oman)

27 November 2025
18:45 UTC+11

Macarthur (Australia)	2–1	(Hong Kong) Tai Po
Vickery 50', 70'	Report	Sartori 24'

Campbelltown Sports Stadium, Sydney (Note: Players of Tai Po FC wore black armbands and a moment of silence was observed as a remembrance of victims of a major fire the day before.)
Attendance: 1,544
Referee: Oh Hyeon-jeong (South Korea)
27 November 2025
19:15 UTC+7

Công An Hà Nội (Vietnam)	2–1	(China) Beijing Guoan
Mauk 76'; Nguyễn Đình Bắc 90'	Report	Lin Liangming 11'

Hàng Đẫy Stadium, Hanoi
Attendance: 4,739
Referee: Ahmed Khalil (Bahrain)

11 December 2025
20:15 UTC+8

Tai Po (Hong Kong)	1–0	(Vietnam) Công An Hà Nội
Temelkovski 13' (pen.)	Report

Mong Kok Stadium, Hong Kong
Attendance: 2,544
Referee: Hanna Hattab (Syria)
11 December 2025
20:15 UTC+8

Beijing Guoan (China)	1–2	(Australia) Macarthur
Serginho 59'	Report	Popovic 56'; Sawyer 71' (pen.)

Workers' Stadium, Beijing
Attendance: 20,759
Referee: Ahmad Alaeddin (Lebanon)

===== Group F =====
Pos	Team	Pld	W	D	L	GF	GA	GD	Pts	Qualification	GOS	RPM	TND	EAS
1	(Japan) Gamba Osaka	6	6	0	0	16	2	+14	18	Advance to round of 16	—	2–0	3–1	3–1
2	(Thailand) Ratchaburi	6	3	0	3	15	8	+7	9	Advance to round of 16	0–2	—	2–0	5–1
3	(Vietnam) Nam Định	6	3	0	3	14	7	+7	9		0–1	3–1	—	9–0
4	(Hong Kong) Eastern	6	0	0	6	2	30	−28	0		0–5	0–7	0–1	—

Source: ACL2
Rules for classification: Tiebreakers
17 September 2025
19:00 UTC+9

Gamba Osaka (Japan)	3–1	(Hong Kong) Eastern
Welton 28'; Usami 70'; Hümmet 75'	Report	Gil 29'

Suita City Football Stadium, Suita
Attendance: 6,640
Referee: Meder Tayçiev (Kyrgyzstan)
17 September 2025
19:15 UTC+7

Nam Định (Vietnam)	3–1	(Thailand) Ratchaburi
Caio 35'; Brenner 52', 57'	Report	Tana 60'

Thiên Trường Stadium, Ninh Bình
Attendance: 8,618
Referee: Kim Yu-jeong (South Korea)

2 October 2025
18:00 UTC+8

Eastern (Hong Kong)	0–1	(Vietnam) Nam Định
	Report	Hansen 54'

Mong Kok Stadium, Hong Kong
Attendance: 1,511
Referee: Hasan Akrami (Iran)
2 October 2025
19:15 UTC+7

Ratchaburi (Thailand)	0–2	(Japan) Gamba Osaka
	Report	Abe 64'; Meshino 90+4'

Dragon Solar Park, Ratchaburi
Attendance: 6,769
Referee: Yahya Al-Mulla (United Arab Emirates)

22 October 2025
19:00 UTC+9

Gamba Osaka (Japan)	3–1	(Vietnam) Nam Định
Mito 16'; Jebali 52'; Wálber 89' (o.g.)	Report	Hudlin 90+4'

Suita City Football Stadium, Suita
Attendance: 9,231
Referee: Ahmed Khalil (Bahrain)
22 October 2025
19:15 UTC+7

Ratchaburi (Thailand)	5–1	(Hong Kong) Eastern
Tana 2'; Denílson 39', 49', 56'; Ikhsan 89'	Report	Okubo 74'

Dragon Solar Park, Ratchaburi
Attendance: 3,775
Referee: Baraa Aisha (Palestine)

5 November 2025
20:15 UTC+8

Eastern (Hong Kong)	0–7	(Thailand) Ratchaburi
	Report	Allardice 52'; Tana 56', 72'; Denílson 65', 83'; Ikhsan 89', 90+5'

Mong Kok Stadium, Hong Kong
Attendance: 1,137
Referee: Venkatesh Ramachandran (India)
5 November 2025
19:15 UTC+7

Nam Định (Vietnam)	0–1	(Japan) Gamba Osaka
	Report	Mito 8'

Thiên Trường Stadium, Ninh Bình
Attendance: 4,518
Referee: Baraa Aisha (Palestine)

27 November 2025
18:00 UTC+8

Eastern (Hong Kong)	0–5	(Japan) Gamba Osaka
	Report	R. Yamashita 4'; Fukuoka 19'; Abe 33'; Hümmet 59'; Nawata 75'

Mong Kok Stadium, Hong Kong
Attendance: 1,881
Referee: Ahmad A'Qashah (Singapore)
27 November 2025
17:00 UTC+7

Ratchaburi (Thailand)	2–0	(Vietnam) Nam Định
Sidcley 90+2'; Ikhsan 90+5'	Report

Dragon Solar Park, Ratchaburi
Attendance: 3,779
Referee: Nasrullo Kabirov (Tajikistan)

11 December 2025
19:00 UTC+9

Gamba Osaka (Japan)	2–0	(Thailand) Ratchaburi
Nawata 53'; R. Yamashita 78'	Report

Suita City Football Stadium, Suita
Attendance: 9,569
Referee: Dong Fangyu (China)
11 December 2025
17:00 UTC+7

Nam Định (Vietnam)	9–0	(Hong Kong) Eastern
Caio 2'; Pham-Ba 4'; Hoàng Anh 10'; Rômulo 17', 19'; Brenner 42', 59' (pen.), 64'; Leung Chun Pong 90+2' (o.g.)	Report

Thiên Trường Stadium, Ninh Bình
Attendance: 2,988
Referee: Kim Dae-yong (South Korea)

=== Cup competitions (women) ===
==== AFC Women's Champions League ====
===== Preliminary stage Group E =====
Pos	Team	Pld	W	D	L	GF	GA	GD	Pts	Qualification
1	(India) East Bengal	2	1	1	0	2	1	+1	4	Advance to group stage
2	(Hong Kong) Kitchee	2	0	2	0	4	4	0	2	
3	(Cambodia) Phnom Penh Crown (H)	2	0	1	1	3	4	−1	1	

Source: AFC
Rules for classification: Tiebreakers
(H) Hosts

== See also ==
- Hong Kong Football Association
- Hong Kong national football team
- Hong Kong women's national football team
- Hong Kong national under-23 football team
- Hong Kong national under-20 football team
- Hong Kong national under-17 football team
