= 2021–22 Hong Kong Third Division League =

Hong Kong Third Division
- Season: 2021–22
- Champions: None
- Promoted: 3 Sing; Kowloon Cricket Club; Sai Kung; Wing Go
- Relegated: None
- Matches played: 100
- Goals scored: 398 (3.98 per match)
- Top goalscorer: Caleb Ekwegwo (3 Sing); 22 goals
- Biggest home win: 3 Sing 8–0 Sun Hei (14 November 2021)
- Biggest away win: Pegasus 0–10 3 Sing (12 December 2021)
- Highest scoring: Pegasus 0–10 3 Sing (12 December 2021)

The 2021–22 Hong Kong Third Division League was the 8th season of Hong Kong Third Division since it became the fourth-tier football league in Hong Kong in 2014–15. The season began on 29 September 2021.

== Effects of the COVID-19 pandemic ==
On 5 January 2022, the Hong Kong government announced a tightening of social distancing measures between 7 January to 20 January in order to control the Omicron outbreak. Public recreation facilities, such as football pitches, were closed and members of the public were barred from gathering in groups of more than two, making it impossible for the season to continue. The Hong Kong Football Association announced on the same day that it would also postpone any scheduled matches in the successive two week period.

After the measures were extended several times in the following weeks, the government announced on 22 February that it would extend the measures until 20 April, making it nearly impossible to complete the season before most player contracts expired on 31 May. The HKFA held an emergency meeting with the clubs on 25 February, after which it was determined that the remainder of the season would be cancelled.

== Format ==
Promotion and relegation were suspended during the 2020–21 season and the season was shortened to a single round-robin due to the COVID-19 pandemic in Hong Kong. As a result, all 16 teams from the previous season were permitted to remain during the 2021–22 season and four additional teams were approved for play.

During the 2021–22 season, the Third Division will also be played as a single round-robin.

== Teams ==
=== Changes from last season ===
==== To Third Division ====
===== Relegated from Premier League =====
- Pegasus

===== New Clubs =====
- 3 Sing
- City
- Heng Wah

== League table ==
Pos	Team	Pld	W	D	L	GF	GA	GD	Pts	Promotion or relegation
1	3 Sing (P)	10	9	1	0	59	7	+52	28	Promotion to the Second Division
2	Wing Go (P)	10	9	1	0	33	7	+26	28	Promotion to the Second Division
3	Sai Kung (P)	10	9	0	1	39	4	+35	27	Promotion to the Second Division
4	Gospel	10	8	2	0	31	11	+20	26	
5	Tsuen Wan	10	8	0	2	37	13	+24	24	
6	Kowloon Cricket Club (P)	10	7	2	1	26	11	+15	23	Promotion to the Second Division
7	WSE	10	7	1	2	25	7	+18	22	
8	Heng Wah (W)	10	6	0	4	9	9	0	18	Withdrew from League System
9	Tsun Tat	10	4	2	4	17	20	−3	14	
10	Fukien	10	4	2	4	9	12	−3	14	
11	Lung Moon	10	3	3	4	9	22	−13	12	
12	City	10	3	2	5	11	18	−7	11	
13	Ornament	10	3	1	6	23	29	−6	10	
14	Islands	10	3	0	7	16	31	−15	9	
15	Lansbury	10	2	1	7	13	26	−13	7	
16	KCDRSC	10	1	3	6	8	26	−18	6	
17	Kui Tan	10	1	1	8	13	34	−21	4	
18	Sun Hei	10	0	2	8	7	30	−23	2	
19	Pegasus	10	0	1	9	8	39	−31	1	
20	Kai Bo	10	0	1	9	5	42	−37	1	

Updated to match(es) played on 19 December 2021. Source: Hong Kong Football Association
Rules for classification: 1) Points; 2) Head-to-head points; 3) Head-to-head goal difference; 4) Head-to-head goals scored; 5) Goal difference; 6) Goals scored; 7) Fair-play points; 8) Drawing lots
(P) Promoted; (W) Withdrew
