= 2017–18 Hong Kong Third Division League =

Hong Kong Third Division
- Season: 2017–18
- Champions: North District
- Promoted: North District; Leaper St. Joseph's
- Relegated: Tuen Mun FC; KMB
- Matches: 132
- Goals: 465 (3.52 per match)
- Top goalscorer: Tang Tsz Kwan (Leaper St. Joseph's) (25 goals)
- Biggest home win: North District 9–0 Tuen Mun (18 March 2018)
- Biggest away win: Ornament 0–11 Leaper St. Joseph's (22 April 2018)
- Highest scoring: Ornament 0–11 Leaper St. Joseph's (22 April 2018)
- Longest winning run: 11 matches North District
- Longest unbeaten run: 13 matches Kwok Keung
- Longest winless run: 10 matches Ornament
- Longest losing run: 6 matches Tuen Mun FC

The 2017–18 Hong Kong Third Division League was the 4th season of Hong Kong Third Division since it became the fourth-tier football league in Hong Kong in 2014–15. The season began on 16 September 2017 and ended on 13 May 2018.

== Teams ==
=== Changes from last season ===
==== From Third Division ====
Promoted to Second Division

- Happy Valley
- Fu Moon
- GFC Friends
- Fukien

Eliminated from league

- Telecom
- King Mountain

Withdrawn from league

- V Sports

==== To Third Division ====
Relegated from Second Division

- Kwok Keung
- Tuen Mun FC

==== New Clubs ====
- Freemen FC
- Lung Moon
- KMB

== League table ==
Pos	Team	Pld	W	D	L	GF	GA	GD	Pts	Promotion or relegation
1	North District (C, P)	22	18	2	2	78	19	+59	56	Promotion to Second Division
2	Leaper St. Joseph's (P)	22	15	6	1	69	23	+46	51	Promotion to Second Division
3	Kwok Keung	22	11	6	5	45	24	+21	39	
4	Freemen FC	22	11	5	6	29	27	+2	38	
5	New Fair Kui Tan	22	10	3	9	45	44	+1	33	
6	Islands	22	8	6	8	34	41	−7	30	
7	KCDRSC	22	9	1	12	36	40	−4	28	
8	Tsuen Wan	22	6	7	9	31	35	−4	25	
9	Lung Moon	22	5	6	11	31	44	−13	21 (Note: Lung Moon wins head-to-head against Ornament)	
10	Ornament	22	5	6	11	27	54	−27	21	
11	Tuen Mun FC (E)	22	5	2	15	24	58	−34	17	Elimination from League System
12	KMB (E)	22	2	4	16	16	56	−40	10	Elimination from League System

Updated to match(es) played on 13 May 2018. Source: Hong Kong Football Association
Rules for classification: 1) Points; 2) Head-to-head points; 3) Head-to-head goal difference; 4) Head-to-head goals scored; 5) Goal difference; 6) Goals scored; 7) Fair-play points; 8) Drawing lots
(C) Champions; (E) Eliminated; (P) Promoted
