= 2018–19 Hong Kong Third Division League =

Hong Kong Third Division
- Season: 2018–19
- Champions: CFCSSHK
- Promoted: CFCSSHK; Kwai Tsing
- Relegated: MLFA; Freemen FC
- Matches: 182
- Goals: 643 (3.53 per match)
- Top goalscorer: Leung Pok Hei (Kui Tan) (35 goals)
- Biggest home win: Tsuen Wan 8–0 Islands (4 November 2018)
- Biggest away win: MLFA 0–12 CFCSSHK (28 October 2018)
- Highest scoring: MLFA 0–12 CFCSSHK (28 October 2018)
- Longest winning run: 10 matches Kui Tan
- Longest unbeaten run: 12 matches CFCSSHK
- Longest winless run: 13 matches Ornament
- Longest losing run: 8 matches MLFA

The 2018–19 Hong Kong Third Division League was the 5th season of Hong Kong Third Division since it became the fourth-tier football league in Hong Kong in 2014–15. The season began on 16 September 2018 and ended on 26 May 2019.

== Teams ==
=== Changes from last season ===
==== From Third Division ====
===== Promoted to Second Division =====
- North District
- St. Joseph's

===== Eliminated from league =====
- Tuen Mun FC
- KMB

==== To Third Division ====
===== Relegated from Second Division =====
- Kwai Tsing
- GFC Friends
- Sai Kung
- Fukien

===== New Clubs =====
- CFCSSHK
- MLFA

== League table ==
Pos	Team	Pld	W	D	L	GF	GA	GD	Pts	Promotion or relegation
1	CFCSSHK (C, P)	26	20	3	3	82	23	+59	63	Promotion to Second Division
2	Kwai Tsing (P)	26	18	4	4	66	25	+41	58	Promotion to Second Division
3	Kui Tan	26	17	5	4	70	28	+42	56	
4	Kwok Keung	26	15	4	7	53	35	+18	49	
5	GFC Friends	26	13	9	4	54	27	+27	48	
6	Fukien	26	11	4	11	35	29	+6	37	
7	Tsuen Wan	26	11	3	12	37	41	−4	36	
8	Islands	26	7	7	12	33	61	−28	28	
9	KCDRSC	26	6	7	13	33	48	−15	25 (Note: KCDRSC wins head-to-head against Ornament and Sai Kung)	
10	Ornament	26	6	7	13	34	51	−17	25	
11	Sai Kung	26	7	4	15	42	59	−17	25	
12	Lung Moon	26	5	6	15	34	50	−16	21 (Note: Lung Moon wins head-to-head against MLFA)	
13	MLFA (E)	26	6	3	17	36	90	−54	21	Elimination from League System
14	Freemen FC (E)	26	6	2	18	34	76	−42	20	Elimination from League System

Updated to match(es) played on 26 May 2019. Source: Hong Kong Football Association
Rules for classification: 1) Points; 2) Head-to-head points; 3) Head-to-head goal difference; 4) Head-to-head goals scored; 5) Goal difference; 6) Goals scored; 7) Fair-play points; 8) Drawing lots
(C) Champions; (E) Eliminated; (P) Promoted
