= 2020–21 Hong Kong Third Division League =

Hong Kong Third Division
- Season: 2020–21
- Champions: King Mountain
- Matches: 120
- Goals: 416 (3.47 per match)
- Top goalscorer: Caleb Ekwegwo (King Mountain) (25 goals)
- Biggest home win: King Mountain 6–0 WSE (6 June 2021)
- Biggest away win: KCDRSC 1–10 King Mountain (13 June 2021)
- Highest scoring: KCDRSC 1–10 King Mountain (13 June 2021)
- Longest winning run: 12 matches King Mountain
- Longest unbeaten run: 12 matches King Mountain
- Longest winless run: 10 matches Sai Kung
- Longest losing run: 5 matches Kui Tan; KCDRSC

The 2020–21 Hong Kong Third Division League was the 7th season of Hong Kong Third Division since it became the fourth-tier football league in Hong Kong in 2014–15.

== Effects of the COVID-19 pandemic ==
Due to the forced cancellation of the 2019–20 season, there were no teams relegated into the Third Division this season.

== League table ==
Pos	Team	Pld	W	D	L	GF	GA	GD	Pts
1	King Mountain (C)	15	14	0	1	66	13	+53	42
2	Sun Hei	15	13	0	2	46	18	+28	39
3	WSE	15	11	1	3	37	16	+21	34
4	Wing Go	15	8	3	4	27	18	+9	27
5	Ornament	15	8	1	6	34	22	+12	25
6	Islands	15	6	3	6	22	26	−4	21
7	Tsun Tat	15	5	5	5	25	22	+3	20 (Note: Tsun Tat wins head-to-head against Sai Kung Friends)
8	Sai Kung Friends	15	5	5	5	24	23	+1	20
9	Fukien	15	6	1	8	21	22	−1	19
10	Tsuen Wan	15	4	5	6	22	26	−4	17
11	Kowloon Cricket Club	15	4	4	7	20	29	−9	16
12	Lansbury	15	4	2	9	16	29	−13	14 (Note: Lansbury wins head-to-head against Sai Kung)
13	Sai Kung	15	3	5	7	12	29	−17	14
14	Kui Tan	15	3	4	8	19	38	−19	13
15	Lung Moon	15	1	5	9	16	36	−20	8
16	KCDRSC	15	2	2	11	9	49	−40	8

Updated to match(es) played on 13 June 2021. Source: Hong Kong Football Association
(C) Champions
