= 2022–23 Hong Kong Third Division League =

Hong Kong Third Division
- Season: 2022–23
- Champions: WSE
- Promoted: WSE; Sun Hei
- Relegated: Lung Moon
- Matches played: 210
- Goals scored: 674 (3.21 per match)
- Top goalscorer: Au Yueng Lok Hin (Islands) (18 goals)
- Biggest home win: WSE 6–0 Tuen Mun FC (20 November 2022)
- Biggest away win: Lansbury 0–7 WSE (2 April 2023)
- Highest scoring: Ornament 5–4 Tsuen Wan (2 April 2023)
- Longest winning run: 8 matches Sun Hei
- Longest unbeaten run: 27 matches WSE
- Longest winless run: 23 matches Lung Moon
- Longest losing run: 7 matches Lung Moon; City

The 2022–23 Hong Kong Third Division League is the 9th season of Hong Kong Third Division since it became the fourth-tier football league in Hong Kong in 2014–15.

== Teams ==
=== Changes from last season ===
==== From Third Division ====
===== Promoted to Second Division =====
- 3 Sing
- Kowloon Cricket Club
- Sai Kung
- Wing Go

===== Withdrawn from Third Division =====
- Heng Wah

==== Name changes ====
- Kai Bo renamed as Tuen Mun FC

== League table ==
Pos	Team	Pld	W	D	L	GF	GA	GD	Pts	Promotion or relegation
1	WSE (C, P)	28	21	7	0	74	16	+58	70	Promotion to Second Division
2	Sun Hei (P)	28	18	6	4	70	24	+46	60	Promotion to Second Division
3	Fukien	28	17	7	4	57	29	+28	58	
4	Tsun Tat	28	16	5	7	64	43	+21	53	
5	Islands	28	13	9	6	43	33	+10	48	
6	Gospel	28	10	7	11	42	46	−4	37	
7	City	28	10	4	14	42	49	−7	34	
8	Pegasus	28	10	4	14	41	54	−13	34	
9	Tsuen Wan	28	9	6	13	40	46	−6	33	
10	KCDRSC	28	8	7	13	42	49	−7	31	
11	Lansbury	28	8	7	13	36	56	−20	31	
12	Ornament	28	7	7	14	51	74	−23	28	
13	Tuen Mun FC	28	7	5	16	26	50	−24	26	
14	Kui Tan	28	7	3	18	28	62	−34	24	
15	Lung Moon (E)	28	2	10	16	18	43	−25	16	Elimination from League System

Updated to match(es) played on 2 July 2023. Source: Hong Kong Football Association
(C) Champions; (E) Eliminated; (P) Promoted
