= 2023–24 Hong Kong Third Division League =

Hong Kong Third Division
- Season: 2023–24
- Champions: Supreme FC
- Promoted: Supreme FC; Tsuen Wan
- Relegated: Ornament
- Matches played: 210
- Goals scored: 674 (3.21 per match)
- Top goalscorer: Kong Ping Lung (Double Flower) (21 goals)
- Biggest home win: St. Joseph's 6–0 St. Joseph's (17 March 2024)
- Biggest away win: Kui Tan 0–6 Double Flower (22 October 2023); St. Joseph's 2–8 Kui Tan (12 May 2024)
- Highest scoring: St. Joseph's 3–8 Tsun Tat (10 March 2024)
- Longest winning run: 7 matches Double Flower
- Longest unbeaten run: 13 matches Supreme FC
- Longest winless run: 10 matches Ravia Orion
- Longest losing run: 6 matches Kui Tan

The 2023–24 Hong Kong Third Division League was the 10th season of Hong Kong Third Division since it became the fourth-tier football league in Hong Kong in 2014–15. The season began on 24 September 2023 and ended on 16 June 2024.

== Teams ==
=== Changes from last season ===
==== From Third Division ====
===== Promoted to Second Division =====
- Sun Hei
- WSE

===== Eliminated from league =====
- Lung Moon

==== To Third Division ====
===== Relegated from Second Division =====
- Double Flower
- St. Joseph's

===== New Clubs =====
- Konter

==== Name changes ====
- Lansbury renamed as Supreme FC
- City renamed as Sui Tung
- Pegasus renamed as Ravia Orion

== League table ==
Pos	Team	Pld	W	D	L	GF	GA	GD	Pts	Promotion or relegation
1	Supreme FC (C, P)	28	19	6	3	72	20	+52	63	Promotion to Second Division
2	Tsuen Wan (P)	28	19	4	5	48	21	+27	61	Promotion to Second Division
3	Double Flower	28	17	4	7	60	24	+36	55	
4	Tsun Tat	28	15	6	7	68	49	+19	51	
5	St. Joseph's	28	13	5	10	69	69	0	44	
6	Gospel	28	11	8	9	45	31	+14	41	
7	KCDRSC	28	8	11	9	30	37	−7	35	
8	Kui Tan	28	9	4	15	56	62	−6	31 (Note: Kui Tan win head-to-head against Sui Tung)	
9	Sui Tung	28	8	7	13	43	64	−21	31	
10	Konter	28	8	6	14	34	58	−24	30 (Note: Konter win head-to-head against Islands and Fukien)	
11	Islands	28	6	12	10	28	35	−7	30	
12	Fukien	28	7	9	12	28	37	−9	30	
13	Ravia Orion	28	6	10	12	36	51	−15	28	
14	Tuen Mun FC	28	7	5	16	24	58	−34	26	
15	Ornament (E)	28	7	3	18	33	58	−25	24	Elimination from League System

Updated to match(es) played on 16 June 2024. Source: Hong Kong Football Association
(C) Champions; (E) Eliminated; (P) Promoted
