= 2017–18 Happy Valley AA season =

Happy Valley 2017–18
- Manager: Shum Kwok Pui
- 2nd Div League: 1st
- FA Cup Jr Div: Second Round
| Home colours | Away colours |

== Players ==
As of 2 August 2017.

Note: Flags indicate national team as defined under FIFA eligibility rules; some limited exceptions apply. Players may hold more than one non-FIFA nationality.

| No. | Pos. | Nation | Player |
|---|---|---|---|
| 1 | GK | HKG | Chung Hon Kit |
| 2 | DF | HKG | Cheung Chun Hin |
| 3 | DF | HKG | Siu Chi Ho |
| 4 | DF | HKG | Tsang Chung Nam |
| 5 | DF | HKG | Tam Chi Kit |
| 6 | DF | HKG | Ma Man Chun |
| 7 | MF | HKG | Yuen Sai Kit |
| 9 | FW | HKG | Wong Sheung Choi |
| 10 | MF | HKG | Liu Yik Shing |
| 11 | FW | HKG | Lai Ming Lai |
| 12 | MF | HKG | Yiu Kam Ming |
| 13 | FW | HKG | Ngai Pok Keung |
| 14 | DF | HKG | Ma Yik Chun |
| 15 | DF | HKG | Wong Ho Yin |
| 16 | DF | HKG | Ng Ho Lun |

| No. | Pos. | Nation | Player |
|---|---|---|---|
| 17 | MF | HKG | Tam Chi Fung |
| 18 | DF | HKG | Wong King Wah |
| 19 | DF | HKG | Lau Cheuk Nam |
| 20 | FW | HKG | Chung Chi Kit |
| 21 | FW | HKG | Wong Chi Hong |
| 22 | GK | HKG | Yeung Lap Wai |
| 23 | DF | HKG | Chan Wun |
| 25 | MF | HKG | Pau Ka Yiu |
| 26 | MF | HKG | Ng Tsz Chung |
| 27 | MF | HKG | Au Kin Siu |
| 28 | DF | HKG | Cheng King Lok |
| 29 | MF | HKG | Luk Koon Pong |
| 30 | GK | HKG | Yu Ka Wai |
| 31 | MF | HKG | Yung Hui To |
| 32 | MF | HKG | Ku Wing Yip |

== Competitions ==
Win Draw Loss

=== Hong Kong Second Division League ===
==== Table ====
| Pos | Team | Pld | W | D | L | GF | GA | GD | Pts | Promotion or relegation |
|---|---|---|---|---|---|---|---|---|---|---|
| 1 | Happy Valley (C, P) | 26 | 19 | 6 | 1 | 58 | 16 | +42 | 63 | Promotion to First Division |
| 2 | Central & Western (P) | 26 | 14 | 9 | 3 | 48 | 21 | +27 | 51 | Promotion to First Division |
| 3 | Tuen Mun | 26 | 14 | 4 | 8 | 34 | 35 | −1 | 46 | |
| 4 | Sun Source | 26 | 14 | 2 | 10 | 48 | 44 | +4 | 44 | |
| 5 | Wing Go Fu Moon | 26 | 12 | 3 | 11 | 35 | 42 | −7 | 39 | |

Updated to match(es) played on 13 May 2018. Source: Hong Kong Football Association
Rules for classification: 1) Points; 2) Head-to-head points; 3) Head-to-head goal difference; 4) Head-to-head goals scored; 5) Goal difference; 6) Goals scored; 7) Fair-play points; 8) Drawing lots
(C) Champions; (P) Promoted

==== League Matches ====
| 10 September 2017 2 | Sai Kung | 1 - 3 | Happy Valley | Ma On Shan, New Territories |
| 13:30 (UTC+8) | Lee Kai Wing 57' (pen.) | Report | Liu Yik Shing 10'; Lai Ming Lai 52'; Chung Chi Kit 68' | Stadium: Ma On Shan Recreation Ground |

| 17 September 2017 3 | Happy Valley | 2 - 1 | Sun Source | Tai Po, New Territories |
| 13:30 (UTC+8) | Tam Chi Kit 21'; Lai Ming Lai 85' | Report | Yip Ching Fung 17' | Stadium: Kwong Fuk Park Football Pitch |

| 24 September 2017 4 | Tuen Mun | 0 - 2 | Happy Valley | Tuen Mun, New Territories |
| 15:30 (UTC+8) | | Report | Ngai Pok Keung 45+4'; Luk Koon Pong 88' (pen.) | Stadium: Wu Shan Recreation Playground |

| 8 October 2017 5 | Happy Valley | 5 - 0 | Kwai Tsing | Tuen Mun, New Territories |
| 13:30 (UTC+8) | Ngai Pok Keung 5'; Lai Ming Lai 50', 78' (pen.); Tam Chi Kit 65'; Yuen Sai Kit 84' | Report | | Stadium: Tuen Mun Tang Shiu Kin Sports Ground |

| 22 October 2017 7 | Yau Tsim Mong | 0 - 1 | Happy Valley | Ma On Shan, New Territories |
| 13:30 (UTC+8) | | Report | Wong Sheung Choi 24' | Stadium: Ma On Shan Sports Ground |

| 29 October 2017 8 | Happy Valley | 3 - 0 | Kwong Wah | Tsing Yi, New Territories |
| 15:30 (UTC+8) | Ngai Pok Keung 2'; Wong Chi Hong 28'; Lai Ming Lai 61' | Report | | Stadium: Tsing Yi Northeast Park |

| 12 November 2017 9 | Kowloon City | 2 - 3 | Happy Valley | Kowloon Tsai, Kowloon |
| 13:30 (UTC+8) | Chan Tsz Lok 77'; Ma Man Chun 85' (o.g.) | Report | Luk Koon Pong 20' (pen.), 55'; Chung Chi Kit 43' | Stadium: Kowloon Tsai Park #1 |

| 19 November 2017 10 | Happy Valley | 0 - 0 | Fukien | Tai Po, New Territories |
| 15:30 (UTC+8) | | Report | | Stadium: Kwong Fuk Park Football Pitch |

| 25 November 2017 11 | Central & Western | 1 - 1 | Happy Valley | Happy Valley, Hong Kong Island |
| 18:30 (UTC+8) | Chan Ho Yin 63' | Report | Tam Chi Kit 85' | Stadium: Happy Valley Recreation Ground #2 |

| 3 December 2017 12 | Happy Valley | 0 - 0 | Wing Go Fu Moon | Ma On Shan, New Territories |
| 13:30 (UTC+8) | | Report | | Stadium: Ma On Shan Sports Ground |

| 10 December 2017 13 | Happy Valley | 3 - 1 | Sham Shui Po | Tin Shui Wai, New Territories |
| 13:30 (UTC+8) | Tsang Chung Nam 5'; Lai Ming Lai 64'; Pau Ka Yiu 75' | Report | Mak Ho San 35' (pen.) | Stadium: Tin Yip Road Park |

| 14 January 2018 6 | Happy Valley | 3 - 0 | GFC Friends | Ma On Shan, New Territories |
| 15:30 (UTC+8) | Wong Chi Hong 42', 59'; Chung Chi Kit 66' | Report | | Stadium: Ma On Shan Recreation Ground |

| 21 January 2018 1 | Happy Valley | 4 - 2 | Lucky Mile | Tin Shui Wai, New Territories |
| 15:30 (UTC+8) | Lai Ming Lai 1'; Wong King Wa 15'; Yuen Sai Kit 50'; Ng Tsz Chung 75' | Report | Wong Chi Chuen 76', 81' | Stadium: Tin Yip Road Park |

| 4 February 2018 14 | Fukien | 0 - 1 | Happy Valley | Sai Kung, New Territories |
| 15:30 (UTC+8) | | Report | Chung Chi Kit 71' | Stadium: Sai Kung Tang Shiu Kin Sports Ground |

| 11 February 2018 15 | Happy Valley | 1 - 0 | Sai Kung | Tuen Mun, New Territories |
| 15:30 (UTC+8) | Luk Koon Pong 48' | Report | | Stadium: Wu Shan Recreation Playground |

| 25 February 2018 16 | Sun Source | 1 - 3 | Happy Valley | Tsing Yi, New Territories |
| 13:30 (UTC+8) | Ma Man Chun 4'; Luk Koon Pong 85' (pen.); Pau Ka Yiu 90' | Report | Cheung Wai Sing 54' | Stadium: Tsing Yi Northeast Park |

=== Hong Kong FA Cup Junior Division ===
| 17 December 2017 R1 | Happy Valley | 1 - 0 | Wing Go Fu Moon | Ma On Shan, New Territories |
| 15:30 (UTC+8) | Au Kin Siu 44' | Report | | Stadium: Ma On Shan Recreation Ground |

| 24 December 2017 R2 | Shatin | 5 - 1 | Happy Valley | Diamond Hill, Kowloon |
| 13:00 (UTC+8) | Law Pui Yuen 9'; David Jordan 41', 66', 81', 90+2' | Report | Yuen Sai Kit 49' | Stadium: Po Kong Village Road Park Pitch #1 (A-TURF) |
