= 2008–09 Hong Kong Third Division League =

2008–09 Hong Kong Third Division League is the 7th season since the establishment of Hong Kong Third Division "District" League.

== League tables ==
=== Third "A" ===
Pos	Team	Pld	W	D	L	GF	GA	GD	Pts	Qualification
1	Lucky Mile (C, A)	19	15	1	3	45	17	+28	46	Third Division final round
2	Derico (A, P)	19	13	3	3	51	10	+41	42	Third Division final round
3	Ornament	19	12	3	4	42	21	+21	39	
4	St. Joseph's	19	10	8	1	39	22	+17	38	
5	Five-One-Seven	19	10	6	3	42	25	+17	36	
6	Fire Services	19	9	7	3	19	11	+8	34	
7	Lung Moon	19	9	4	6	41	25	+16	31 (Note: LUM 1–1 BLG)	
8	Blake Garden	19	8	7	4	41	28	+13	31	
9	Telecom	19	7	5	7	33	31	+2	26	
10	New Fair Kui Tan	19	6	6	7	24	30	−6	24 (Note: NKT 2–1 FUM)	
11	Fu Moon	19	7	3	9	23	26	−3	24	
12	Hi Lee	19	6	5	8	26	18	+8	23 (Note: SUS 0–3 HIL)	
13	Sun Source	19	7	2	10	17	33	−16	23	
14	KCDRSC	19	5	5	9	22	25	−3	20	
15	Kln. Fruit	19	4	6	9	16	35	−19	18 (Note: FRU: 6 pts, 3–1; TUS: 4 pts, 3–4; TUM: 1 pts, 2–3)	
16	Tung Sing	19	4	6	9	22	30	−8	18	
17	Tuen Mun FC	19	4	6	9	29	45	−16	18	
18	Kwong Wah	19	5	1	13	25	57	−32	16	
19	Solon	19	4	3	12	20	35	−15	15	Third Division elimination playoff
20	Yau Luen Golden Sea	19	1	1	17	16	69	−53	4	Third Division elimination playoff

Updated to match(es) played on 29 March 2009. Source: The Hong Kong Football Association
Rules for classification: 1) points; 2) head-to-head points; 3) head-to-head goal difference; 4) head-to-head goals scored; 5) goal difference; 6) number of goals scored.
(A) Advance to a further round; (C) Champions; (P) Promoted

=== Third "District" ===
Pos	Team	Pld	W	D	L	GF	GA	GD	Pts	Qualification
1	Tuen Mun (C, A, O, P)	14	11	3	0	40	12	+28	36	Third Division final round
2	Sai Kung (A)	14	10	3	1	48	15	+33	33 (Note: SAK 4–2 SSP)	Third Division final round
3	Sham Shui Po	14	10	3	1	49	15	+34	33	
4	Southern	14	10	1	3	42	12	+30	31	
5	HKSSF	14	7	2	5	27	21	+6	23	
6	Tsuen Wan	14	6	3	5	28	20	+8	21	
7	Yau Tsim Mong	14	5	4	5	19	14	+5	19 (Note: YUL 0–2 YTM)	
8	Yuen Long	14	6	1	7	23	35	−12	19	
9	Central & Western	14	5	3	6	28	26	+2	18	
10	Kwun Tong	14	5	2	7	23	20	+3	17	
11	Kowloon City	14	5	0	9	19	38	−19	15	
12	Wong Tai Sin	14	4	2	8	7	20	−13	14	
13	Eastern District	14	4	0	10	15	41	−26	12	
14	North District	14	1	3	10	6	32	−26	6	Third Division elimination playoff
15	Wanchai	14	1	0	13	7	60	−53	3	Third Division elimination playoff

Updated to match(es) played on 22 March 2009. Source: The Hong Kong Football Association
Rules for classification: 1) points; 2) head-to-head points; 3) head-to-head goal difference; 4) head-to-head goals scored; 5) goal difference; 6) number of goals scored.
(A) Advance to a further round; (C) Champions; (O) Play-off winners; (P) Promoted

=== Final Round ===
Pos	Team	Pld	W	D	L	GF	GA	GD	Pts	Promotion
1	Tuen Mun (C, P)	3	3	0	0	6	3	+3	9	Promotion to 2009–10 Hong Kong Second Division League
2	Derico Friends (P)	3	1	1	1	5	2	+3	4 (Note: DER 1–1 LML)	Promotion to 2009–10 Hong Kong Second Division League
3	Lucky Mile	3	1	1	1	3	2	+1	4	
4	Sai Kung	3	0	0	3	3	10	−7	0	

Updated to match(es) played on 19 April 2009. Source: The Hong Kong Football Association
Rules for classification: 1) points; 2) head-to-head points; 3) head-to-head goal difference; 4) head-to-head goals scored; 5) goal difference; 6) number of goals scored.
(C) Champions; (P) Promoted

=== Elimination playoff ===
Pos	Team	Pld	W	D	L	GF	GA	GD	Pts	Relegation
1	Solon	3	2	1	0	10	2	+8	7	
2	North District	3	2	0	1	6	5	+1	6	
3	Yau Luen Golden Sea (R)	3	1	1	1	12	5	+7	4	Elimination from Hong Kong football league system
4	Wanchai (R)	3	0	0	3	3	19	−16	0	Elimination from Hong Kong football league system

Updated to match(es) played on 19 April 2009. Source: The Hong Kong Football Association
Rules for classification: 1) points; 2) head-to-head points; 3) head-to-head goal difference; 4) head-to-head goals scored; 5) goal difference; 6) number of goals scored.
(R) Relegated
