= 2018–19 Hong Kong Second Division League =

Hong Kong Second Division
- Season: 2018–19
- Champions: North District
- Promoted: North District; Kwun Tong
- Relegated: Qiyi Hanstti; Sun Hei
- Matches played: 182
- Goals scored: 799 (4.39 per match)
- Top goalscorer: Ng Man Hei (Kwun Tong) (21 goals)
- Biggest home win: North District 7–0 Tung Sing (28 April 2019)
- Biggest away win: Sun Hei 0–8 St. Joseph's (31 March 2019)
- Highest scoring: Kwong Wah 6–3 Lucky Mile (25 November 2018); Kwun Tong 6–3 Tuen Mun (23 February 2019)
- Longest winning run: 10 matches North District
- Longest unbeaten run: 21 matches North District
- Longest winless run: 9 matches Sun Hei
- Longest losing run: 8 matches Sun Hei

The 2018–19 Hong Kong Second Division League was the 5th season of the Hong Kong Second Division since it became the third-tier football league in Hong Kong in 2014–15. The season began on 9 September 2018 and ended on 26 May 2019.

== Teams ==
=== Changes from last season ===
==== From Second Division ====
===== Promoted to First Division =====
- Happy Valley
- Central & Western

===== Relegated to Third Division =====
- Kwai Tsing
- GFC Friends
- Sai Kung
- Fukien

==== To Second Division ====
===== Relegated from First Division =====
- Sun Hei
- Tung Sing
- Kwun Tong
- Wan Chai

===== Promoted from Third Division =====
- North District
- St. Joseph's

== League table ==
Pos	Team	Pld	W	D	L	GF	GA	GD	Pts	Promotion or relegation
1	North District (C, P)	26	21	3	2	67	20	+47	66	Promotion to First Division
2	Sham Shui Po (P)	26	18	1	7	60	27	+33	55	Promotion to First Division
3	Kwun Tong	26	17	3	6	54	29	+25	54	
4	St. Joseph's	26	15	4	7	57	34	+23	49	
5	Kwong Wah	26	12	6	8	51	33	+18	42	
6	Tuen Mun	26	11	6	9	46	46	0	39	
7	Lucky Mile	26	11	4	11	46	43	+3	37	
8	Wing Go Fu Moon	26	11	2	13	36	43	−7	35	
9	Yau Tsim Mong	26	10	2	14	39	45	−6	32	
10	Wan Chai	26	8	5	13	33	47	−14	29	
11	Kowloon City	26	8	3	15	28	46	−18	27	
12	Tung Sing	26	8	2	16	36	53	−17	26	
13	Qiyi Hanstti (R)	26	6	2	18	25	59	−34	20	Relegation to Third Division
14	Sun Hei (R)	26	3	3	20	21	74	−53	12	Relegation to Third Division

Updated to match(es) played on 26 May 2019. Source: Hong Kong Football Association
Rules for classification: 1) Points; 2) Head-to-head points; 3) Head-to-head goal difference; 4) Head-to-head goals scored; 5) Goal difference; 6) Goals scored; 7) Fair-play points; 8) Drawing lots
(C) Champions; (P) Promoted; (R) Relegated
