= 2019–20 Hong Kong Third Division League =

Hong Kong Third Division
- Season: 2019–20
- Champions: N/A (season abandoned)
- Matches: 118
- Goals: 403 (3.42 per match)
- Top goalscorer: Yim Tsz Wai (Lansbury) (13 goals)
- Biggest home win: Kwok Keung 7–1 Sai Kung (5 January 2020)
- Biggest away win: Kui Tan 1–7 Kwok Keung (12 January 2020)
- Highest scoring: Lansbury 8–4 King Mountain (12 December 2019)
- Longest winning run: 14 matches Wing Go
- Longest unbeaten run: 15 matches Wing Go
- Longest winless run: 15 matches King Mountain
- Longest losing run: 15 matches King Mountain

The 2019–20 Hong Kong Third Division League was the 6th season of Hong Kong Third Division since it became the fourth-tier football league in Hong Kong in 2014–15. The season began on 8 September 2019 and ended on 16 April 2020 when the Hong Kong Football Association announced the cancellation of all lower division seasons due to the 2020 coronavirus pandemic in Hong Kong.

== Teams ==
=== Changes from last season ===
==== From Third Division ====
===== Promoted to Second Division =====
- CFCSSHK
- Kwai Tsing

===== Eliminated from league =====
- MLFA
- Freemen FC

==== To Third Division ====
===== Relegated from Second Division =====
- Qiyi Hanstti
- Sun Hei

===== New Clubs =====
- WSE
- Ravia King Mountain
- Kowloon Cricket Club
- Wing Go

==== Name changes ====
- Qiyi Hanstti renamed as Lansbury

== League table ==
Pos	Team	Pld	W	D	L	GF	GA	GD	Pts
1	Wing Go	15	14	1	0	39	11	+28	43
2	Kwok Keung	14	10	1	3	44	15	+29	31
3	WSE	15	9	4	2	30	11	+19	31
4	Lansbury	15	8	4	3	36	22	+14	28
5	Sun Hei	15	9	1	5	34	23	+11	28
6	Fukien	15	8	2	5	19	16	+3	26
7	Islands	14	8	1	5	31	22	+9	25
8	GFC Friends	15	7	3	5	27	21	+6	24
9	Lung Moon	14	6	1	7	25	29	−4	19
10	Sai Kung	15	4	3	8	18	28	−10	15
11	Ornament	15	3	5	7	22	32	−10	14
12	Kowloon Cricket Club	14	4	2	8	14	26	−12	14
13	Tsuen Wan	15	4	2	9	18	28	−10	14
14	KCDRSC	15	4	2	9	15	31	−16	14
15	Kui Tan	15	3	2	10	17	39	−22	11
16	King Mountain	15	0	0	15	13	48	−35	0

Updated to match(es) played on 22 January 2020. Source: Hong Kong Football Association
