= 2017–18 Hong Kong Second Division League =

Hong Kong Second Division
- Season: 2017-18
- Champions: Happy Valley
- Promoted: Happy Valley; Central & Western
- Relegated: Kwai Tsing; GFC Friends; Sai Kung; Fukien
- Matches: 182
- Goals: 503 (2.76 per match)
- Top goalscorer: Chung Man Ho (Central & Western); Lam Wai Lok (Tuen Mun) (14 goals)
- Biggest home win: Happy Valley 5-0 Kwai Tsing (8 October 2017)
- Biggest away win: Wing Go Fu Moon 0-6 Happy Valley (11 March 2018)
- Highest scoring: Kowloon City 7-3 Tuen Mun (13 May 2017)
- Longest winning run: 8 matches Happy Valley
- Longest unbeaten run: 22 matches Happy Valley
- Longest winless run: 9 matches Sai Kung
- Longest losing run: 5 matches Sai Kung; Fukien

The 2017–18 Hong Kong Second Division League was the 4th season of Hong Kong Second Division since it became the third-tier football league in Hong Kong in 2014–15. The season began on 3 September 2017 and ended on 13 May 2018.

== Teams ==
=== Changes from last season ===
==== From Second Division ====
Promoted to First Division

- Sparta Rotterdam (Mutual)
- Hoi King

Relegated to Third Division

- Kwok Keung
- Tuen Mun FC

==== To Second Division ====
Relegated from First Division

- Kwai Tsing
- Yau Tsim Mong

Promoted from Third Division

- Happy Valley
- Fu Moon
- GFC Friends
- Fukien

== League table ==
Pos	Team	Pld	W	D	L	GF	GA	GD	Pts	Promotion or relegation
1	Happy Valley (C, P)	26	19	6	1	58	16	+42	63	Promotion to First Division
2	Central & Western (P)	26	14	9	3	48	21	+27	51	Promotion to First Division
3	Tuen Mun	26	14	4	8	34	35	−1	46	
4	Sun Source	26	14	2	10	48	44	+4	44	
5	Wing Go Fu Moon	26	12	3	11	35	42	−7	39	
6	Sham Shui Po	26	9	11	6	36	24	+12	38	
7	Kowloon City	26	10	6	10	43	42	+1	36	
8	Kwong Wah	26	10	4	12	34	31	+3	34	
9	Yau Tsim Mong	26	9	3	14	29	44	−15	30	
10	Lucky Mile	26	6	8	12	38	43	−5	26 (Note: Lucky Mile wins head-to-head against Kwai Tsing)	
11	Kwai Tsing (R)	26	6	8	12	27	42	−15	26	Relegation to Third Division
12	GFC Friends (R)	26	7	3	16	25	48	−23	24 (Note: GFC Friends wins head-to-head against Fukien and Sai Kung)	Relegation to Third Division
13	Sai Kung (R)	26	6	6	14	28	45	−17	24	Relegation to Third Division
14	Fukien (R)	26	5	9	12	20	26	−6	24	Relegation to Third Division

Updated to match(es) played on 13 May 2018. Source: Hong Kong Football Association
Rules for classification: 1) Points; 2) Head-to-head points; 3) Head-to-head goal difference; 4) Head-to-head goals scored; 5) Goal difference; 6) Goals scored; 7) Fair-play points; 8) Drawing lots
(C) Champions; (P) Promoted; (R) Relegated
