= Hong Kong Fourth Division League =

- Founded: 1955
- Folded: 2014
- Country: Hong Kong
- Confederation: AFC
- Number of clubs: 14
- Level on pyramid: 4
- Promotion to: Hong Kong Third Division League
- Relegation to: Disaffiliated
- Domestic cup: FA Cup Junior Division
- Last champions: Yau Tsim Mong
- Most championships: Tai Wah, Yau Tsim Mong, Sai Kung (1)
- Website: HKFA
- Current: 2013–14 Hong Kong Fourth Division League

Hong Kong Fourth Division League was a division of the Hong Kong Football Association in Hong Kong. It was the fourth overall tier of the Hong Kong football league system.

Hong Kong Fourth Division League was originally introduced in 1955 and dissolved in 1956 but was reintroduced in 2012 again as a fourth tier league. It was folded again in 2014 after the establishment of the Hong Kong Premier League.

== Past winners ==
- 1955–56: Tai Wah
- 2012–13: Yau Tsim Mong
- 2013–14: Sai Kung

== 2012–13 standings ==
Pos	Team	Pld	W	D	L	GF	GA	GD	Pts	Promotion or relegation
1	Yau Tsim Mong (C, P)	28	26	0	2	148	20	+128	78	Promotion to Third Division
2	Mutual (P)	28	23	2	3	132	38	+94	71	Promotion to Third Division
3	Kwong Wah (P)	28	18	4	6	72	36	+36	58	Promotion to Third Division
4	Sun Source (P)	28	17	4	7	98	38	+60	55	Promotion to Third Division
5	Sai Kung Friends	28	15	5	8	62	41	+21	50	
6	St. Joseph's	28	13	6	9	43	39	+4	45	
7	Sai Kung	28	12	3	13	58	46	+12	39	
8	Central & Western	28	10	2	16	49	74	−25	32	
9	Solon	28	9	5	14	44	76	−32	32	
10	Lung Moon	28	10	1	17	28	66	−38	31	
11	North District	28	8	4	16	47	101	−54	28	
12	Ornament	28	8	4	16	46	74	−28	28	
13	Islands	28	8	3	17	49	70	−21	27	
14	Tung Sing	28	5	7	16	33	77	−44	22	
15	Blake Garden (E)	28	2	2	24	18	131	−113	8	Elimination from Hong Kong league

Updated to match(es) played on 19 May 2013. Source: Fourth Division Score Table
Rules for classification: 1) points; 2) head-to-head points; 3) head-to-head goal difference; 4) head-to-head goals scored; 5) goal difference; 6) number of goals scored.
(C) Champions; (E) Eliminated; (P) Promoted

== 2013–14 standings ==
Pos	Team	Pld	W	D	L	GF	GA	GD	Pts	Promotion or relegation
1	Sai Kung	20	17	1	2	86	10	+76	52	Promotion to Third Division
2	GFC Friends	20	14	4	2	41	21	+20	46	
3	Central & Western	20	12	2	6	47	20	+27	38	
4	Tung Sing	20	11	4	5	51	18	+33	37	
5	Ornament	20	8	7	5	31	46	−15	31	
6	Islands	20	9	2	9	39	44	−5	29	
7	St. Joseph's	20	8	1	11	32	28	+4	25	
8	Fukien	20	7	3	10	41	30	+11	24	
9	Rainbow Legend North District	20	5	3	12	30	51	−21	18	
10	Lung Moon	20	4	3	13	27	46	−19	15	
11	Solon	20	0	0	20	7	118	−111	0	Eliminated from League System

Updated to match(es) played on 1 December 2013. Source:
Rules for classification: 1) points; 2) head-to-head points; 3) head-to-head goal difference; 4) head-to-head goals scored; 5) goal difference; 6) number of goals scored.
