= 2022–23 Hong Kong Second Division League =

Hong Kong Second Division
- Season: 2022–23
- Champions: 3 Sing
- Promoted: 3 Sing; Sai Kung
- Relegated: Double Flower; St. Joseph's
- Matches: 240
- Goals: 889 (3.7 per match)
- Top goalscorer: Caleb Ekwegwo (3 Sing) (35 goals)
- Biggest home win: 3 Sing 7–1 Fu Moon (11 December 2022)
- Biggest away win: St. Joseph's 0–10 Sai Kung (6 November 2022)
- Highest scoring: St. Joseph's 4–9 CFCSSHK (21 May 2023)
- Longest winning run: 17 matches 3 Sing
- Longest unbeaten run: 30 matches 3 Sing
- Longest winless run: 28 matches St. Joseph's
- Longest losing run: 16 matches St. Joseph's

The 2022–23 Hong Kong Second Division League is the 9th season of the Hong Kong Second Division since it became the third-tier football league in Hong Kong in 2014–15. The season began on 9 October 2022.

== Teams ==
=== Changes from last season ===
==== From Second Division ====
===== Promoted to First Division =====
- Kowloon City
- Kwai Tsing

==== To Second Division ====
===== Promoted from Third Division =====
- 3 Sing
- Kowloon Cricket Club
- Sai Kung
- Wing Go

== League table ==
Pos	Team	Pld	W	D	L	GF	GA	GD	Pts	Promotion or relegation
1	3 Sing (C, P)	30	28	2	0	116	17	+99	86	Promotion to the First Division
2	Sai Kung (P)	30	22	2	6	86	35	+51	68	Promotion to the First Division
3	Wing Go	30	18	4	8	78	52	+26	58	
4	Kowloon Cricket Club	30	17	4	9	63	42	+21	55	
5	Yau Tsim Mong	30	15	8	7	64	43	+21	53	
6	Mutual	30	16	3	11	68	58	+10	51	
7	Lucky Mile	30	15	6	9	59	37	+22	51	
8	CFCSSHK	30	11	6	13	53	52	+1	39	
9	Kwun Tong	30	11	4	15	35	40	−5	37	
10	Kwong Wah	30	11	4	15	39	59	−20	37	
11	Wan Chai	30	9	6	15	48	52	−4	33	
12	Tuen Mun	30	8	8	14	41	57	−16	32 (Note: Tuen Mun is ahead on goal difference.)	
13	Fu Moon	30	9	5	16	37	69	−32	32	
14	Tung Sing	30	10	1	19	48	82	−34	31	
15	Double Flower (R)	30	4	3	23	30	87	−57	15	Relegation to the Third Division
16	St. Joseph's (R)	30	1	4	25	24	107	−83	7	Relegation to the Third Division

Updated to match(es) played on 25 June 2023. Source: Hong Kong Football Association
Rules for classification: 1) Points; 2) Head-to-head points; 3) Head-to-head goal difference; 4) Head-to-head goals scored; 5) Goal difference; 6) Goals scored; 7) Fair-play points; 8) Drawing lots
(C) Champions; (P) Promoted; (R) Relegated
