= So Dick On =

Hong Kong footballer

Personal information
- Full name: So Dick On
- Date of birth: 4 February 2002 (age 24)
- Place of birth: Hong Kong
- Height: 1.75 m (5 ft 9 in)
- Position: Forward

Youth career
- 2014–2019: Chelsea Soccer School (Hong Kong)
- 2019–2020: Happy Valley

Senior career*
Years	Team	Apps	(Gls)
2020–2021	Happy Valley	2	(0)
2021	Southern	0	(0)
2022–2024	Sai Kung	18	(4)
2025	Sai Kung	2	(0)
- * Club domestic league appearances and goals

So Dick On (Chinese: 蘇荻安; born 4 February 2002) is a former Hong Kong professional footballer who played as a forward.

== Club career ==
On 18 September 2020, So was promoted to the first team of Happy Valley.

On 14 August 2021, So joined Southern.

== Career statistics ==
=== Club ===
As of 30 September 2020.

Club	Season	League			National Cup		League Cup		Continental		Other		Total	
Club	Season	Division	Apps	Goals	Apps	Goals	Apps	Goals	Apps	Goals	Apps	Goals	Apps	Goals
Happy Valley	2019–20	Hong Kong Premier League	1	0	0	0	0	0	–		0	0	1	0
Career total			1	0	0	0	0	0	0	0	0	0	1	0
