= 2025–26 Hong Kong Third Division League =

Hong Kong Third Division
- Season: 2025–26
- Champions: Sun Hei
- Promoted: Sun Hei; Double Flower; Tsun Tat
- Relegated: Chandler Lambert
- Matches: 176
- Goals: 643 (3.65 per match)
- Top goalscorer: Reinaldo (Double Flower) (28 goals)
- Biggest home win: Ravia 10–0 Wui Hong (9 November 2025)
- Biggest away win: Qi Yi 1–5 Sun Hei (19 October 2025); St. Joseph's 1–5 Sun Hei (26 October 2025); Tsun Tat 1–5 Sun Hei (10 May 2026)
- Highest scoring: Ravia 8–0 KCDRSC (12 April 2025)
- Longest winning run: 9 matches Sun Hei
- Longest unbeaten run: 18 matches Sun Hei
- Longest winless run: 11 matches Wui Hong
- Longest losing run: 7 matches Wui Hong

The 2025–26 Hong Kong Third Division League is the 12th season of Hong Kong Third Division since it became the fourth-tier football league in Hong Kong in 2014–15. The season began on 7 September 2025 and ended on 31 May 2026.

== Teams ==
=== Changes from last season ===
==== From Third Division ====
===== Promoted to Second Division =====
- Kui Tan
- Gospel
- Sui Tung
- Kowloon Cricket Club
- Fukien
- Wan Chai

===== Eliminated from league =====
- Pak Hei

==== To Third Division ====
===== Relegated from Second Division =====
- Sun Hei
- Sai Kung

===== New Clubs =====
- Chandler Lambert
- Qi Yi
- Ornament
- Wui Hong
- CityLinkers SW

== League table ==
Pos	Team	Pld	W	D	L	GF	GA	GD	Pts	Promotion or relegation
1	Sun Hei	15	14	1	0	52	9	+43	43	Qualification for the Championship round
2	Double Flower	15	12	1	2	35	12	+23	37	Qualification for the Championship round
3	Tsun Tat	15	8	6	1	31	16	+15	30	Qualification for the Championship round
4	Ravia	15	8	2	5	44	17	+27	26	Qualification for the Championship round
5	Qi Yi	15	7	3	5	23	26	−3	24	Qualification for the Championship round
6	Tuen Mun FC	15	7	2	6	25	22	+3	23	Qualification for the Championship round
7	KCDRSC	15	5	6	4	19	20	−1	21	Qualification for the Championship round
8	Sai Kung	15	6	2	7	28	28	0	20	Qualification for the Championship round
9	Ornament	15	5	4	6	33	33	0	19	Qualification for the Relegation round
10	St. Joseph's	15	5	4	6	24	26	−2	19	Qualification for the Relegation round
11	Ling Yui Orion	15	5	2	8	27	38	−11	17	Qualification for the Relegation round
12	CityLinkers SW	15	4	2	9	18	39	−21	14	Qualification for the Relegation round
13	Islands	15	4	2	9	20	23	−3	14	Qualification for the Relegation round
14	Konter	15	3	3	9	21	40	−19	12	Qualification for the Relegation round
15	Wui Hong Sports Centre	15	2	2	11	14	44	−30	8	Qualification for the Relegation round
16	Chandler Lambert	15	2	2	11	10	37	−27	8	Qualification for the Relegation round

Updated to match(es) played on 11 January 2026. Source: Hong Kong Football Association

== Championship round ==
Pos	Team	Pld	W	D	L	GF	GA	GD	Pts	Promotion or relegation
1	Sun Hei (C, P)	22	19	1	2	73	19	+54	58	Promotion to the Second Division
2	Double Flower (P)	22	16	2	4	50	19	+31	50	Promotion to the Second Division
3	Tsun Tat (P)	22	11	7	4	41	31	+10	40	Promotion to the Second Division
4	Ravia	22	12	3	7	62	28	+34	39	
5	Qi Yi	22	11	4	7	41	37	+4	37	
6	Tuen Mun FC	22	9	3	10	35	39	−4	30	
7	Sai Kung	22	8	3	11	36	42	−6	27	
8	KCDRSC	22	6	6	10	27	43	−16	24	

Updated to match(es) played on 24 May 2026. Source: Hong Kong Football Association
Rules for classification: 1) Points; 2) Head-to-head points; 3) Head-to-head goal difference; 4) Head-to-head goals scored; 5) Goal difference; 6) Goals scored; 7) Fair-play points; 8) Drawing lots
(C) Champions; (P) Promoted

== Relegation round ==
Pos	Team	Pld	W	D	L	GF	GA	GD	Pts	Promotion or relegation
1	St. Joseph's	22	10	4	8	48	37	+11	34	
2	CityLinkers SW	22	8	4	10	40	52	−12	28	
3	Islands	22	7	4	11	31	29	+2	25 (Note: Islands won the head-to-head over Konter)	
4	Konter	22	7	4	11	35	49	−14	25	
5	Ornament	22	6	5	11	44	51	−7	23 (Note: Ornament won the head-to-head over Orion)	
6	Ling Yui Orion	22	6	5	11	34	57	−23	23	
7	Wui Hong Sports Centre	22	5	4	13	31	59	−28	19	
8	Chandler Lambert (E)	22	3	3	16	15	57	−42	12	Elimination from league system

Updated to match(es) played on 31 May 2026. Source: Hong Kong Football Association
Rules for classification: 1) Points; 2) Head-to-head points; 3) Head-to-head goal difference; 4) Head-to-head goals scored; 5) Goal difference; 6) Goals scored; 7) Fair-play points; 8) Drawing lots
(E) Eliminated
