= 2023–24 Hong Kong Second Division League =

Hong Kong Second Division
- Season: 2023–24
- Champions: Wofoo Social Enterprises
- Promoted: Wofoo Social Enterprises; Tuen Mun
- Relegated: Kowloon Cricket Club; Wan Chai
- Matches played: 240
- Goals scored: 740 (3.08 per match)
- Top goalscorer: Kam Wai Liam (Tuen Mun) (26 goals)
- Biggest home win: Leaper 8–0 Kowloon Cricket Club (26 May 2024); Wan Chai 7–1 Kwai Tsing (10 December 2023)
- Biggest away win: Kwai Tsing 2–7 Fu Moon (24 September 2023)
- Highest scoring: Kwai Tsing 2–7 Fu Moon (24 September 2023)
- Longest winning run: 6 matches Tuen Mun; WSE
- Longest unbeaten run: 19 matches WSE
- Longest winless run: 11 matches Kwong Wah
- Longest losing run: 9 matches Tung Sing

The 2023–24 Hong Kong Second Division League was the 10th season of the Hong Kong Second Division since it became the third-tier football league in Hong Kong in 2014–15. The season began on 24 September 2023 and ended on 16 June 2024.

== Teams ==
=== Changes from last season ===
==== From Second Division ====
===== Promoted to First Division =====
- 3 Sing
- Sai Kung

===== Relegated to Third Division =====
- Double Flower
- St. Joseph's

==== To Second Division ====
===== Promoted from Third Division =====
- Sun Hei
- Wofoo Social Enterprises

===== Relegated from First Division =====
- Kwai Tsing
- Leaper MG

== League table ==
Pos	Team	Pld	W	D	L	GF	GA	GD	Pts	Promotion or relegation
1	Wofoo Social Enterprises (C, P)	30	19	10	1	69	18	+51	67	Promotion to the First Division
2	Tuen Mun (P)	30	19	6	5	61	35	+26	63	Promotion to the First Division
3	Leaper	30	16	9	5	60	26	+34	57	
4	Yau Tsim Mong	30	16	4	10	70	40	+30	52	
5	Lucky Mile	30	13	9	8	52	37	+15	48	
6	Kwun Tong	30	11	13	6	49	38	+11	46	
7	Wing Go	30	11	8	11	44	41	+3	41	
8	Kwai Tsing	30	10	6	14	41	59	−18	36	
9	Kwong Wah	30	8	10	12	42	48	−6	34 (Note: Kwong Wah win head-to-head against Chelsea Soccer School)	
10	CFCSSHK (W)	30	9	7	14	42	56	−14	34	Withdrew from league system
11	Tung Sing	30	9	6	15	33	46	−13	33	
12	Fu Moon	30	8	8	14	49	67	−18	32	
13	Sun Hei	30	8	7	15	31	47	−16	31 (Note: Sun Hei win head-to-head against Mutual)	
14	Mutual	30	9	4	17	35	67	−32	31	
15	Kowloon Cricket Club (R)	30	8	6	16	34	61	−27	30	Relegation to the Third Division
16	Wan Chai (R)	30	5	9	16	28	54	−26	24	Relegation to the Third Division

Updated to match(es) played on 16 June 2024. Source: Hong Kong Football Association
Rules for classification: 1) Points; 2) Head-to-head points; 3) Head-to-head goal difference; 4) Head-to-head goals scored; 5) Goal difference; 6) Goals scored; 7) Fair-play points; 8) Drawing lots
(C) Champions; (P) Promoted; (R) Relegated; (W) Withdrew
