= 1935–36 Hong Kong Third Division League =

Hong Kong Third Division season

Statistics of Hong Kong Third Division League in the 1935/1936 season.

== Overview ==
Eastern Lancashire Regiment won the championship.

== League table ==
Pos	Team	Pld	W	D	L	GF	GA	GD	Pts
1	Eastern Lancashire Regiment (C)	20	15	3	2	84	25	+59	33
2	Royal Welch Fusiliers	20	13	5	2	60	25	+35	31
3	Chinese Police	20	12	4	4	50	28	+22	28
4	Medicals	20	11	4	5	40	30	+10	26
5	Royal Air Force	20	10	4	6	52	37	+15	24
6	Royal Engineers	20	8	3	9	42	35	+7	19
7	Liga Portuguesa	20	9	1	10	42	38	+4	19
8	Royal Ulster Rifles	20	8	2	10	47	54	-7	18
9	European Police	20	6	2	12	35	48	-13	14
10	St. Joseph's	20	2	2	16	27	76	-49	6
11	Railway	20	1	0	19	11	94	-83	2
