= Kiranbir Singh =

Hong Kong footballer

Kiranbir Singh 波比
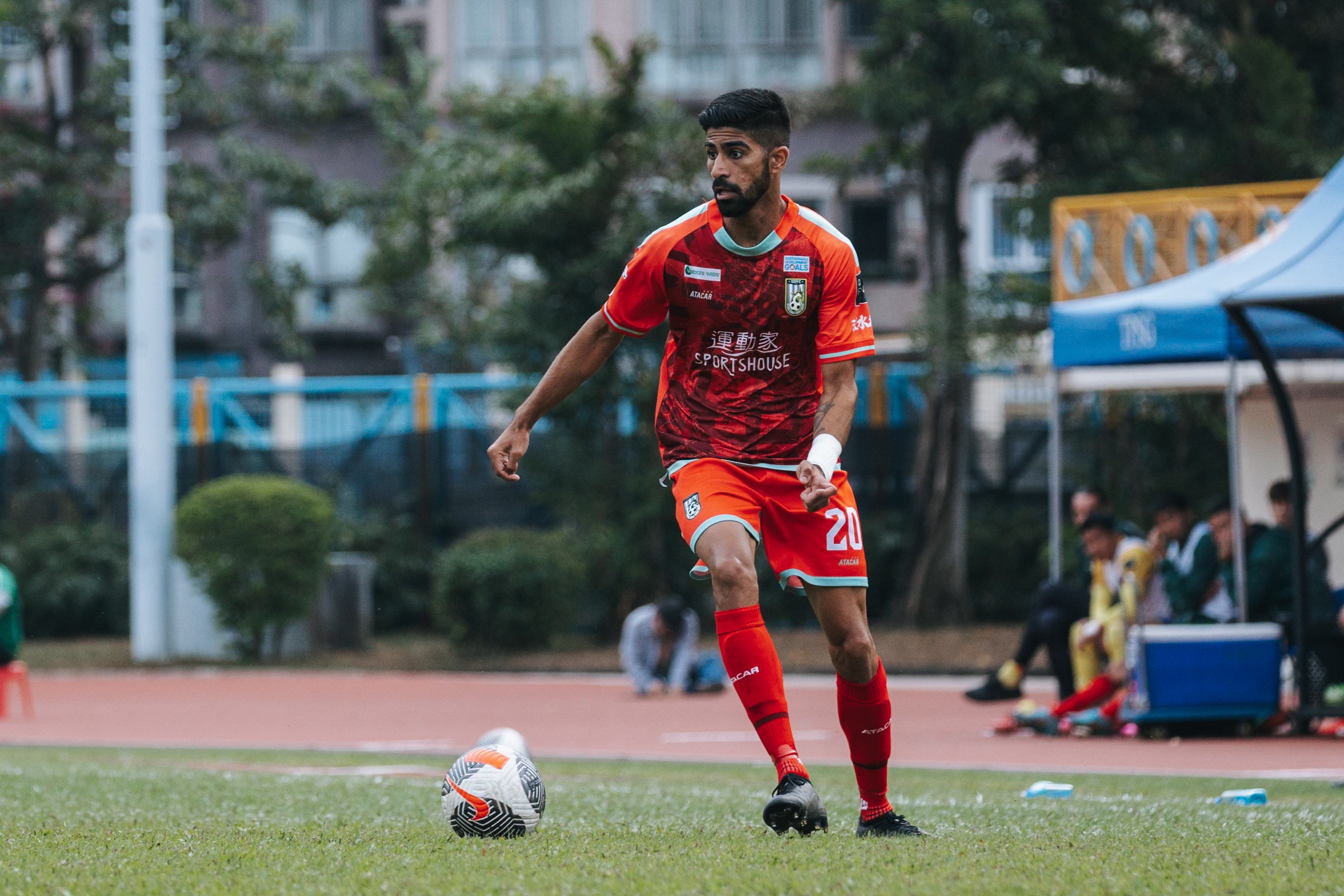

Personal information
- Full name: Bobby Kiranbir Singh
- Date of birth: 27 September 1998 (age 28)
- Place of birth: Hong Kong
- Height: 1.81 m (5 ft 11 in)
- Position: Full-back

Team information
- Current team: North District
- Number: 2

Youth career
- Rangers

Senior career*
Years	Team	Apps	(Gls)
2019–2020	Metro Gallery	11	(3)
2020–2021	Pegasus	8	(3)
2021–2022	Yuen Long	12	(4)
2022	Shatin	10	(5)
2023–2024	Sham Shui Po	28	(1)
2024–	North District	40	(1)
- * Club domestic league appearances and goals as of 20 November 2026

Bobby Kiranbir Singh (Chinese: 波比; born 27 September 1998) is a Hong Kong professional footballer who currently plays as a defender or a winger for Hong Kong Premier League club North District.

== Club career ==
On 7 January 2023, Singh joined Sham Shui Po.

On 8 August 2024, Singh joined North District.

== Personal life ==
Born in Hong Kong, Singh is of Indian descent. He moved to India at the age of three before returning to Hong Kong at twelve. In 2020, Singh received a HKSAR passport and is eligible to represent Hong Kong internationally.

== Career statistics ==
=== Club ===
As of 26 June 2021

Club	Season	League			Domestic Cup		Continental		Total	
Club	Season	Division	Apps	Goals	Apps	Goals	Apps	Goals	Apps	Goals
Pegasus	2020–21	Hong Kong Premier League	8	0	2 (Note: Appearances in the Hong Kong Sapling Cup)	0	0	0	10	0
Career total			8	0	2	0	0	0	10	0
