= 2022–23 Hong Kong First Division League =

Hong Kong First Division
- Season: 2022–23
- Champions: Central & Western
- Promoted: North District
- Relegated: Leaper MG; Kwai Tsing
- Matches: 182
- Goals: 676 (3.71 per match)
- Top goalscorer: Walter Vaz (South China) (27 goals)
- Biggest home win: Central & Western 8–0 Kwai Tsing (18 December 2022) Central & Western 8–0 Happy Valley (15 January 2023)
- Biggest away win: Kwai Tsing 1–8 Central & Western (2 April 2023)
- Highest scoring: Eastern District 3–6 Happy Valley (4 December 2022) Kwai Tsing 1–8 Central & Western (2 April 2023) Central & Western 6–3 Wong Tai Sin (12 February 2023)
- Longest winning run: Central & Western (10 matches)
- Longest unbeaten run: Central & Western (14 matches)
- Longest winless run: Leaper MG (20 matches)
- Longest losing run: Leaper MG (10 matches)

The 2022–23 Hong Kong First Division League was the 9th season of Hong Kong First Division since it became the second-tier football league in Hong Kong in 2014–15. The season began on 2 October 2022 and ended on 28 May 2023.

== Teams ==
=== Changes from last season ===
==== From First Division ====
===== Promoted to the Premier League =====
- Sham Shui Po
- Tai Po

==== To First Division ====
===== Promoted from the Second Division =====
- Kowloon City
- Kwai Tsing

==== Name changes ====
- Metro Gallery renamed as Leaper MG

== League table ==
Pos	Team	Pld	W	D	L	GF	GA	GD	Pts	Promotion or relegation
1	Central & Western (C)	26	21	4	1	79	21	+58	67	
2	Kowloon City	26	17	6	3	67	28	+39	57	
3	North District (P)	26	14	4	8	50	27	+23	46	Promotion to the Premier League
4	South China	26	12	7	7	62	31	+31	43	
5	Sha Tin	26	14	0	12	50	48	+2	42	
6	Yuen Long	26	11	8	7	42	35	+7	41 (Note: Head-to-head points: Yuen Long 4, Wing Yee 1.)	
7	Wing Yee	26	11	8	7	48	29	+19	41	
8	Hoi King	26	10	8	8	58	42	+16	38	
9	Eastern District	26	9	4	13	47	59	−12	31	
10	Citizen	26	8	6	12	44	43	+1	30	
11	Happy Valley (W)	26	8	5	13	47	84	−37	29	Withdrew from league system
12	Wong Tai Sin	26	5	5	16	30	59	−29	20	
13	Leaper MG (R)	26	3	3	20	25	70	−45	12	Relegation to the Second Division
14	Kwai Tsing (R)	26	3	2	21	27	106	−79	11	Relegation to the Second Division

Updated to match(es) played on 28 May 2023. Source: Hong Kong Football Association
Rules for classification: 1) Points; 2) Head-to-head points; 3) Head-to-head goal difference; 4) Head-to-head goals scored; 5) Goal difference; 6) Goals scored; 7) Fair-play points; 8) Drawing lots
(C) Champions; (P) Promoted; (R) Relegated; (W) Withdrew

== Results ==
Home \ Away	BYL	CWD	CIT	EAS	GND	HVA	HOK	KLC	KTS	LMG	SHT	SCA	WYP	WTS
Yuen Long	—	0–0	3–1	0–3 (Note: Eastern District and Yuen Long were both charged with a 0–3 loss due to equipment violation)	1–0	6–1	1–1	2–1	2–2	1–1	3–1	3–2	2–1	1–3
Central & Western	2–2	—	3–1	2–0	4–0	8–0	7–1	2–1	8–0	7–1	2–1	2–1	2–0	6–3
Citizen	1–0	1–2	—	0–2	0–1	1–1	2–2	0–4	5–1	0–1	5–2	1–1	0–2	1–1
Eastern District	0–1	2–3	1–3	—	0–2	3–6	4–3	2–3	1–0	3–1	4–2	2–5	4–3	2–0
North District	2–0	0–1	2–1	7–0	—	4–0	1–1	1–1	3–1	3–1	1–2	1–3	0–2	4–1
Happy Valley	1–1	2–3	0–6	2–2	1–3	—	0–6	4–4	4–2	3–2	1–4	2–5	4–3	3–0
Hoi King	3–1	3–2	2–2	1–1	0–1	3–4	—	1–2	5–1	1–1	1–2	1–1	0–1	4–1
Kowloon City	2–1	0–0	3–0	2–0	2–0	4–1	2–1	—	6–0	2–1	4–0	2–0	2–0	3–4
Kwai Tsing	1–4	0–2	3–2	1–8	0–6	1–2	2–4	0–5	—	2–0	1–4	1–7	1–5	2–4
Leaper MG	0–2	2–5	1–3	2–3	0–3	3–2	0–1	1–3	2–2	—	1–0	1–7	0–3	1–2
Sha Tin	3–1	0–3	2–1	3–0	0–4	3–0	2–5	1–3	7–1	1–0	—	0–3	0–1	4–1
South China	1–1	0–2	1–2	2–2	4–0	1–1	0–1	1–1	3–0	3–0	1–2	—	0–0	3–1
Wing Yee	1–1	0–0	2–2	1–0	1–1	5–0	1–1	3–3	6–0	4–1	1–3	1–2	—	0–0
Wong Tai Sin	1–2	0–1	0–3	1–1	0–0	1–2	0–4	2–2	1–2	2–1	0–1	1–5	0–1	—

Updated to match(es) played on 28 May 2023. Source: HKFA
Legend: Blue = home team win; Yellow = draw; Red = away team win.
