= 2021–22 Hong Kong First Division League =

Hong Kong First Division
- Season: 2021–22
- Champions: None
- Promoted: Tai Po; Sham Shui Po
- Relegated: None
- Matches played: 90
- Goals scored: 293 (3.26 per match)
- Top goalscorer: Law Chun Yan (North District); Mahama Awal (North District) (11 goals)
- Biggest home win: Tai Po 6–0 South China (21 November 2021)
- Biggest away win: Metro Gallery 0–6 North District (21 November 2021)
- Highest scoring: South China 4–5 Sha Tin (19 September 2021)

The 2021–22 Hong Kong First Division League was the 8th season of Hong Kong First Division since it became the second-tier football league in Hong Kong in 2014–15. The season began on 19 September 2021 and ended on 26 December 2021.

== Effects of the COVID-19 pandemic ==
On 5 January 2022, the Hong Kong government announced a tightening of social distancing measures between 7 January to 20 January in order to control the Omicron outbreak. Public recreation facilities, such as football pitches, were closed and members of the public were barred from gathering in groups of more than two, making it impossible for the season to continue. The Hong Kong Football Association announced on the same day that it would also postpone any scheduled matches in the successive two week period.

After the measures were extended several times in the following weeks, the government announced on 22 February that it would extend the measures until 20 April, making it nearly impossible to complete the season before most player contracts expired on 31 May. The HKFA held an emergency meeting with the clubs on 25 February, after which it was determined that the remainder of the season would be cancelled.

== Format ==
Relegation was suspended during the 2020–21 season and the season was shortened to a single round-robin due to the COVID-19 pandemic in Hong Kong. As a result, all 14 teams from the previous season were permitted to remain during the 2021–22 season.

== Teams ==
=== Changes from last season ===
==== From First Division ====
===== Promoted to Premier League =====
- HKFC

==== To First Division ====
===== Relegated from Premier League =====
- Happy Valley

== League table ==
Pos	Team	Pld	W	D	L	GF	GA	GD	Pts	Promotion or relegation
1	Tai Po (P)	13	9	1	3	37	12	+25	28	Promotion to the Premier League
2	Sha Tin	13	8	3	2	31	19	+12	27	
3	Yuen Long	13	8	2	3	27	9	+18	26	
4	Eastern District	13	8	1	4	25	17	+8	25	
5	North District	13	7	4	2	29	10	+19	25	
6	Sham Shui Po (P)	13	6	4	3	20	12	+8	22	Promotion to the Premier League
7	Wing Yee	13	6	3	4	19	12	+7	21	
8	Hoi King	13	5	2	6	15	22	−7	17	
9	Central & Western	13	4	4	5	19	24	−5	16	
10	South China	12	4	2	6	16	22	−6	14	
11	Happy Valley	13	4	1	8	24	31	−7	13	
12	Citizen	13	2	4	7	12	27	−15	10	
13	Wong Tai Sin	13	3	1	9	12	32	−20	10	
14	Metro Gallery	12	0	0	12	7	44	−37	0	

Updated to match(es) played on 26 December 2021. Source: Hong Kong Football Association
Rules for classification: 1) Points; 2) Head-to-head points; 3) Head-to-head goal difference; 4) Head-to-head goals scored; 5) Goal difference; 6) Goals scored; 7) Fair-play points; 8) Drawing lots
(P) Promoted
