= Carlos Páez (footballer) =

Colombian footballer (born 1998)

Personal information
- Full name: Carlos Andrés Páez Rivera
- Date of birth: 22 June 1998 (age 28)
- Place of birth: Colombia
- Position: Centre-back

Team information
- Current team: North District
- Number: 5

Senior career*
Years	Team	Apps	(Gls)
2016–2017	Envigado	12	(0)
2023–2024	Jaguares	18	(0)
2025–	North District	25	(1)
- * Club domestic league appearances and goals as of 20 November 2026

Carlos Andrés Páez Rivera (born 22 June 1998) is a Colombian professional footballer who currently plays as a centre-back for Hong Kong Premier League club North District.

== Club career ==
On 6 August 2025, Páez joined Hong Kong Premier League club North District.
