= KMB Football Team =

KMB
- Full name: KMB Football Team
- Founded: 1947 (original club); 2017 (reformed club)
- Dissolved: 1981 (original club); 2018 (reformed club)
- 2017–18: 12th (eliminated)
Home colours	Away colours

KMB Football Team (Chinese: 九巴足球會) was a Hong Kong football club.

The club last played in the Hong Kong football league system during the 2017–18 season when they finished bottom, and were eliminated from the league system as a result.

== Honours ==
=== Domestic ===
- Hong Kong First Division League (1st tier)

Champions (2): 1953–54, 1966–67

- Hong Kong Senior Shield

Champions (1): 1950–51
Runners-up (1): 1953–54, 1956–57, 1957–58, 1963–64

== Performance in Asian club competitions ==
Season	Round	Date	Opponent	Score	Venue
1969	GS	16 January 1969	(Malaysia) Perak FA	2–6	Bangkok, Thailand
1969	GS	19 January 1969	(Israel) Maccabi Tel Aviv	0–5	Bangkok, Thailand
1969	GS	21 January 1969	(Japan) Toyo Kogyo	0–1	Bangkok, Thailand
1969	GS	23 January 1969	(Iran) Persepolis	0–4	Bangkok, Thailand

== See also ==
- Kowloon Motor Bus
