= North District F.C. =

North District
- Full name: North District Football Club
- Founded: 2002; 24 years ago
- Ground: North District Sports Ground
- Capacity: 2,500
- Chairman: Chu Ho Yin
- Head coach: Sin Ka Yu
- League: Hong Kong Premier League
- 2025–26: Hong Kong Premier League, 5th of 10
Home colours	Away colours

North District Football Club (Chinese: 北區足球會), currently known as Golik North District due to sponsorship reasons, is a Hong Kong professional football club which currently competes in the Hong Kong Premier League, the top tier of Hong Kong football.

== History ==
North District began fielding a football team in the Hong Kong football league system in 2002 as part of a Hong Kong Football Association initiative to involve district representative teams. North District were part of a group of 11 districts who participated in the inaugural season of this project.

During the 2008–09 season, North District finished second bottom from the table and came close to being eliminated from the football league. However, the club was able to finish second in the Elimination Playoff and was allowed to remain.

As part of the HKFA's decision to unify the Third Division A League and the Third Division District League, North District were placed in the Hong Kong Fourth Division during the 2012–13 season based on their prior season's results.

Starting from the 2016–17 season, North District has been branded as Golik North District due to sponsorship reasons.

On 29 April 2018, North District defeated KCDRSC 4–1 to clinch the Hong Kong Third Division title for the first time. They gained promotion to the Hong Kong Second Division.

In the 2018–19 season, North District won the Hong Kong Second Division title and was promoted to the Hong Kong First Division.

On 22 June 2023, after finishing third in the First Division, North District was granted promotion to the Hong Kong Premier League by the HKFA board of directors.

Starting from the 2023–24 season, North District has been rebranded as Crownity North District due to sponsorship reasons.

Starting from the 2025–26 season, North District has been rebranded as Golik North District again due to sponsorship reasons.

== Name history ==
- 2002–2012: North District (北區)
- 2012–2015: Rainbow Legend North District (彩俊北區)
- 2015–2016: REX Global North District (御濠北區)
- 2016–2023: Golik North District (高力北區)
- 2023–2025: Crownity North District (均業北區)
- 2025: North District (北區)
- 2025–: Golik North District (高力北區)

== Team staff ==
Position	Staff
Technical director	
Head coach	(Hong Kong) Sin Ka Yu
Assistant coach	(Hong Kong) Chan Chun Yu
Goalkeeping coach	(Hong Kong) Ho Kwok Chuen
Fitness coach	(Hong Kong) Tam Long Ming
Admin manager	(Hong Kong) Chow Ho Nam Tommy

== Current squad ==
=== First team ===
As of 28 August 2026

Note: Flags indicate national team as defined under FIFA eligibility rules; some limited exceptions apply. Players may hold more than one non-FIFA nationality.

No.	Pos.	Nation	Player
1	GK	HKG	Yuen Wang Chun
2	DF	HKG	Kiranbir Singh
3	DF	HKG	Wong Chun Ho
4	MF	HKG	Fung Kwun Ming
5	DF	COL	Carlos Páez
6	DF	HKG	Tsang Chun Hin
7	FW	HKG	Yuen Sai Kit
8	FW	BRA	Vinicius Soares
9	FW	HKG	Lo Kong Wai (captain)
10	MF	HKG	Law Hiu Chung (vice-captain)
11	MF	BRA	Weverton Gudula
13	GK	HKG	Chan Kun Sun
15	DF	HKG	Wong Ho Yin
16	DF	COL	Kleymar Mosquera
17	FW	HKG	Yiu Ho Chit
18	MF	HKG	Dai Tsz Hin

No.	Pos.	Nation	Player
19	MF	HKG	Jahangir Khan
20	MF	BRA	Kayke David
21	DF	HKG	Yau Tsz Yin
22	MF	COL	Yilber Arboleda
23	MF	HKG	Siu Chung Nam
26	MF	HKG	Chan Chun Hei
30	MF	COL	Franklin Navarro
33	DF	HKG	Tsang Chung Nam
37	DF	HKG	Wong Tsz Ho
63	GK	HKG	Li Hon Ho
70	FW	BRA	Samuel Granada
77	MF	BRA	Victor Kauan
87	MF	HKG	Tsui Long
88	FW	HKG	Lai Sheung Hui
90	MF	POR	Yuri Pinto

== Season-to-season record ==
Season	Tier	Division	Teams	Position	Home stadium	Attendance/G	FA Cup	Senior Shield	League Cup	Sapling Cup
2002–03	3	Third District Division	13				Did not enter			
2003–04	3	Third District Division					Did not enter			
2004–05	3	Third District Division					Did not enter			
2005–06	3	Third District Division	16	14			Did not enter			
2006–07	3	Third District Division	17	14			Did not enter			
2007–08	3	Third District Division	16	9			Did not enter			
2008–09	3	Third District Division	15	14			Did not enter			
2009–10	3	Third District Division	14	8			Did not enter			
2010–11	3	Third District Division	11	8			Did not enter			
2011–12	3	Third District Division	8	8			Did not enter			
2012–13	4	Fourth Division	15	11			Did not enter			
2013–14	4	Fourth Division	11	9			Did not enter			
2014–15	4	Third Division	14	6			Did not enter			
2015–16	4	Third Division	16	4			Did not enter			
2016–17	4	Third Division	14	5			Did not enter			
2017–18	4	Third Division	12	1			Did not enter			
2018–19	3	Second Division	14	1			Did not enter			
2019–20	2	First Division	14	Cancelled			Did not enter			
2020–21	2	First Division	14	2			Did not enter			
2021–22	2	First Division	14	Cancelled			Did not enter			
2022–23	2	First Division	14	3			Did not enter			
2023–24	1	Premier League	11	8	North District Sports Ground	560	First round	First round	Not held	Group stage
2024–25	1	Premier League	9	8	North District Sports Ground	381	First round	Quarter-finals	Not held	Group stage
2025–26	1	Premier League	10	5	North District Sports Ground	517	Semi-finals	Semi-finals	Quarter-finals	Defunct
2026–27	1	Premier League	11		North District Sports Ground			Quarter-finals		Defunct

Note:

1st or Champions 2nd or Runners-up 3rd place Promotion Relegation

== Honours ==
=== League ===
- Hong Kong Second Division
  - Champions (1): 2018–19
- Hong Kong Third Division
  - Champions (1): 2017–18

== Past head coaches ==
- (Hong Kong) Lam Hiu Fung (2016–2017)
- (Hong Kong) Choi Chung Yin (2019–2023)
- (Hong Kong) Leung Chi Wing (2023–2024)
- (Hong Kong) Pau Ka Yiu (2024–2025)
- (Hong Kong) Chan Chi Hong (2025–2026)
