= Happy Valley AA =

Hong Kong football club

Happy Valley
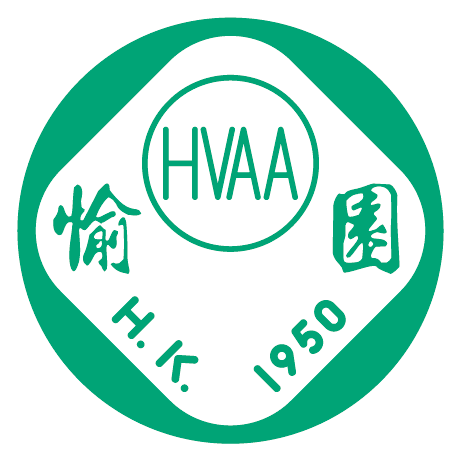
- Full name: Happy Valley Athletic Association Limited
- Nickname: 快活谷 (Happy Valley)
- Short name: HVAA
- Founded: 1950; 76 years ago
- Dissolved: 2022; 4 years ago
- League: Hong Kong First Division
- 2022–23: 11th (football team defunct after season)
- Website: hvfc.hk
Home colours	Away colours

Happy Valley Athletic Association (Chinese: 愉園體育會), known simply as Happy Valley or HVAA, is a Hong Kong sports club which no longer competes in the Hong Kong football league system. They are historically one of the most successful football clubs in Hong Kong, having won the First Division six times and had consistently been in the top division, until they were relegated to the Second Division after the 2009–10 season.

The football section is part of a sports association which also operates swimming, basketball, first aid, table tennis, athletics and various other recreation activities under its umbrella.

== History ==
Following the Second World War, the club was unofficially formed by five former schoolmates at Overseas Chinese University in Taichung, Taiwan. The schoolmates, Ng Kai Chi, Cheung Bing Fat, Cheung Bing Hung, Xie Gun Yang and Yip Wing Tim, frequently gathered at Ng's residence for meetings and were the club's founding fathers as well as players. Although not officially a club at the time, they organized pickup matches against other local teams.

=== 1950s ===
Happy Valley formally registered with the Hong Kong Football Association in 1950 and in 1955 participated in the Chinese Amateur Athletic Federation of Hong Kong's summer football tournament, their first official competition.

During the 1957–58 season, the club were accepted into the Hong Kong Third A Division League. Success at the league level was immediate as the club won league titles in successive years, first winning the Third Division in 1957–58 and then winning the Second Division in 1958–59. Led by manager Chu Wing Keung, Happy Valley finished runners during their inaugural First Division campaign. The squad that season was notably young in age and featured future star Wong Man Wai.

=== 1960s ===
In the aftermath of the 1967 Leftist riots, Happy Valley strongly opposed the HKFA's decision to issue a statement in support of the police. The club responded by withdrawing from the First Division in protest. They reentered the Hong Kong football league system a year later in 1968 through the Third Division with a three-year plan to return to the top flight. The club recruited new players such as Lo Tak Kuen, Chan Jong Deng, and former Hong Kong Rangers star Chung Cho Wai. The plan was successful and Happy Valley returned to the First Division in 1970.

=== 1970s – 2000s ===
Happy Valley finished near the top of the table many times during this decade but were never able to finish as champions. In 1988–89, however, the club finally won the league for the first time since 1965.

With the success of Eastern and other company sponsored teams in the early '90s, Happy Valley were only able to achieve mid table finishes. By the middle of the decade, Eastern decided to rebuild with a young squad following their relegation and the company sponsored teams withdrew from the league. This allowed Happy Valley to enjoy their greatest run of success to date, winning four league titles, two Hong Kong FA Cups and three Senior Shields between 1997 and 2004. The team was led by notable players such as Cheung Sai Ho, Fan Chun Yip, Gerard, Lee Wai Man and Poon Yiu Cheuk.

At the conclusion of the 2008–09, chairman Pui Kwan Kay announced that Kwong Hiu Ming had been hired as Director of Football. His hiring led to a decision to restructure the football club, so as to reduce to the operational budget down to $3 million HKD. All players, with the exception of the three foreign players Ling Cong, Ciu Lin and Godfred Karikari were released and cheaper, younger players were signed.

In January 2010, several players boycotted training due to salary arrears. During the same year on 5 May, the ICAC arrested Ling Cong, Niu Jianlong, Wu Haopeng, Yu Yang and one other former player on suspicion of bribery and match fixing. Ling, Niu, and Wu were later released and all have claimed that they were not arrested, but rather, brought in for questioning in order to assist in the investigation. Yu Yang pleaded guilty to one count of offering an advantage to an agent and was sentenced to 10 months in jail. He was later banned for life by the HKFA following a Disciplinary Task Force meeting. The 60th anniversary of the club ended unceremoniously as the club finished at the bottom of the table, relegating them to the Second Division following a 40-year run in the top flight.

=== 2010s ===
During the club's spell in the Second Division, they were able to retain important pieces such as keeper Cheung Wai Hong while signing Yuen Kin Man and Giorgi Kobakhidze. After a three-year absence, the club were promoted back to the First Division following a second-place finish in 2012–13.

On 5 January 2014, Happy Valley were once again at the centre of match fixing allegations as seven coaching staff and players were arrested by the ICAC following a big 5–0 loss to Sun Hei. Officials entered the team's dressing room at Tsing Yi Sports Ground immediately after the loss and took the seven members in for questioning on suspicion. Three days later, the HKFA postponed all of Happy Valley's for the next month pending the result of a hearing in which the club was to present to an Ad Hoc Committee that they were financially and operationally able to continue the remainder of the season. On 12 February 2014, the HKFA suspended Happy Valley for the duration of the First Division League season as well as expelling them from the FA Cup . The Eastern Court convicted player Saša Mus and deputy manager Hinson Leung of various crimes in connection to match fixing, sentencing Mus to 12 months of jail and fining Leung $4,000 HKD. The club were relegated following the year.

After a last place finish in 2015–16, the club were relegated to the bottom tier of Hong Kong football for the first time in 48 years.

Following successive relegations, it was decided that for the 2016–17 season, Happy Valley would loan players from Tung Sing and Chelsea Soccer School (HK). A U-18 academy team would also be restarted. The decisions proved to be very successful as Happy Valley lost only one league game all season en route to the Third Division title.

In the 2017–18 season, the club once again won the league title and were promoted back to the First Division.

Happy Valley won the First Division during the 2018–19 season. They applied for promotion to the Hong Kong Premier League at the conclusion of the season and were accepted on 17 June 2019.

=== 2020s ===
After two seasons in the Hong Kong Premier League, Happy Valley confirmed that they would not participate in the 2021–22 HKPL season on 1 July 2021 due to financial difficulties.

During the 2022–23 season, Happy Valley were once again embroiled in another match-fixing scandal that saw 11 players and coach Chill Chiu among those arrested.

Starting from the 2023–24 season, Happy Valley withdrew from the Hong Kong football league system. The football section that was ordered to be liquidated was operated by Happy Valley Football Club Co., Ltd. established by Chen Zhishi. The club itself operates independently as Happy Valley Sports Association, so the sports club is not affected in any way. Its track and field department, swimming department, basketball department and other departments are still operating normally after the liquidation of the football section.

== Honours ==
Major trophies are listed below.

=== League ===
- Hong Kong First Division (Tier 1)

Champions (6): 1964–65, 1988–89, 1998–99, 2000–01, 2002–03, 2005–06

- Hong Kong Second Division/Hong Kong First Division (Tier 2)

Champions (3): 1958–59, 1969–70, 2018–19

- Hong Kong Third Division/Hong Kong Second Division (Tier 3)

Champions (3): 1957–58, 1968–69, 2017–18

- Hong Kong Third Division (Tier 4)

Champions (1): 2016–17

=== Cup competitions ===
- Hong Kong Senior Shield

Champions (5): 1977–78, 1982–83, 1989–90, 1997–98, 2003–04

- Hong Kong FA Cup

Champions (2): 1999–00, 2003–04

- Hong Kong Sapling Cup
- Hong Kong League Cup

Champions (1): 2000–01

- Hong Kong FA Cup Junior Division

Champions (1): 2018–19

- Hong Kong Viceroy Cup

Champions (1): 1975–76

== Continental record ==
Season	Competition	Round	Club	Home	Away	Aggregate
1998/99	Asian Cup Winners' Cup	First round	(Pakistan) PIA FC	(w/o)		
1998/99	Asian Cup Winners' Cup	Second round	(Maldives) New Radiant	1–5	3–1	4–6
1998/99	Asian Cup Winners' Cup	Quarter-final	(South Korea) Chunnam Dragons	0–3	1–4	1–7
2000	Asian Club Championship	First round	(Vietnam) Thể Công	Withdrew		
2000/01	Asian Cup Winners Cup	Second round	(Japan) Nagoya Grampus Eight	0–3	3–1	6–1
2002	Asian Club Championship	First round	(Macau) Lam Pak	7–0	0–5	12–0
2002	Asian Club Championship	Second round	(China) Dalian Shide	0–2	8–1	1–10
2005	AFC Cup	Group E	(Maldives) New Radiant	0–2	2–0	4th
2005	AFC Cup	Group E	(Singapore) Home United	0–1	5–0	4th
2005	AFC Cup	Group E	(Malaysia) Pahang	1–1	3–1	4th
2006	AFC Cup	Group F	(Maldives) Hurriyya SC	3–0	1–1	3rd
2006	AFC Cup	Group F	(Singapore) Tampines Rovers	0–4	3–1	3rd
2006	AFC Cup	Group F	(Malaysia) Selangor	2–3	4–3	3rd
2007	AFC Cup	Group E	(Maldives) New Radiant	2–1	0–2	3rd
2007	AFC Cup	Group E	(Singapore) Warriors FC	1–4	2–1	3rd
2007	AFC Cup	Group E	(India) Mahindra United	2–1	3–1	3rd

== Season-to-season record ==
Season	Tier	Division	Teams	Position	Home stadium	Attendance/G	FA Cup	Senior Shield	League Cup	Sapling Cup
2000–01	1	First Division	8	1			Semi-finals		Champions	Not held
2001–02	1	First Division	7	2			Quarter-finals		Group stage	Not held
2002–03	1	First Division	8	1			Quarter-finals	Runner-up	Runner-up	Not held
2003–04	1	First Division	10	3			Champions	Champions	Runner-up	Not held
2004–05	1	First Division	9	2			Runner-up	Runner-up	Runner-up	Not held
2005–06	1	First Division	8	1			Runner-up	Runner-up	Runner-up	Not held
2006–07	1	First Division	10	6			Runner-up	Quarter-finals	Runner-up	Not held
2007–08	1	First Division	10	4			Quarter-finals	Semi-finals	Group stage	Not held
2008–09	1	First Division	13	8			Quarter-finals	First round	First round	Not held
2009–10	1	First Division	11	10	Kowloon Bay Sports Ground	349	Runner-up	First round	Not held	Not held
2010–11	2	Second Division	12	5			Did not enter	Did not enter	Did not enter	Not held
2011–12	2	Second Division	12	6			Did not enter	Did not enter	Did not enter	Not held
2012–13	2	Second Division	11	2			Did not enter	Did not enter	Not held	Not held
2013–14	1	First Division	12	Disqualified	Siu Sai Wan Sports Ground; Tai Po Sports Ground; Kowloon Bay Sports Ground	730	Disqualified	Quarter-finals	Not held	Not held
2014–15	2	First Division	15	14			Did not enter	Did not enter	Did not enter	Not held
2015–16	3	Second Division	12	12			Did not enter	Did not enter	Did not enter	Did not enter
2016–17	4	Third Division	14	1			Did not enter	Did not enter	Not held	Did not enter
2017–18	3	Second Division	14	1			Did not enter	Did not enter	Not held	Did not enter
2018–19	2	First Division	14	1			Did not enter	Did not enter	Not held	Did not enter
2019–20	1	Premier League	10	6	Hammer Hill Road Sports Ground	555	Quarter-finals	First round	Not held	Group stage
2020–21	1	Premier League	8	8	Sham Shui Po Sports Ground	858	Cancelled due to COVID-19 pandemic		Not held	Runner-up
2021–22	2	First Division	14	11			Did not enter	Did not enter	Not held	Did not enter
2022–23	2	First Division	14	11			Did not enter	Did not enter	Not held	Did not enter

Note:

1st or Champions 2nd or Runner-up 3rd place Promotion Relegation

== Retired numbers ==
Note: Flags indicate national team as defined under FIFA eligibility rules; some limited exceptions apply. Players may hold more than one non-FIFA nationality.

No.	Pos.	Nation	Player
8	MF	HKG	Cheung Sai Ho (posthumous)

== Head coaches ==
- (Hong Kong) Chan Hung Ping (1997–2005)
- (Hong Kong) Wong Yiu Shun (2005–2006)
- (Brazil) José Ricardo Rambo (2006)
- (Hong Kong) Lo Kai Wah (2006–2007)
- (Hong Kong) Chan Hung Ping (2007–2008)
- (Hong Kong) Wong Yiu Shun (2008–2009)
- (China) He Jianbo & Cheng Qiang (2009–??)
- (Uruguay) Sergio Timoner (5 Jul 2013 – 8 Oct 2013)
- (Australia) Paul Foster (8 Oct 2013–2015)
- (Hong Kong) Poon Man Tik (20 Jan 2015–2016)
- (Hong Kong) Shum Kwok Pui (2016–2019)
- (Hong Kong) Pau Ka Yiu (2019–2021)
- (Hong Kong) Chill Chiu (2021–2023)

== Club's mascot ==
The mascot of Happy Valley is a panda, as the fan club's captain wearing the number 12 jersey on the squad list.
