= Tuen Mun FC =

- Full name: Tuen Mun Football Club
- Nickname: TMFC
- Founded: 2001
- President: Leung Chi Lap
- Head coach: Chung Pak Man
- League: Hong Kong Third Division
- 2025–26: Third Division, 6th of 16
Home colours	Away colours	Third colours

Tuen Mun Football Club (Chinese: 屯門足球會) is a Hong Kong football club which currently competes in the Hong Kong Third Division.

== History ==
Founded in 2001, the team had been representing Tuen Mun District to compete in the Hong Kong Third 'District' Division League, having won the Hong Kong Third 'District' Division League in the 2004–05 season. However, they became independent from the Tuen Mun District and joined the Hong Kong Third 'A' Division League.

In the 2006–07 season, they became the champions of the Hong Kong Third 'A' Division League, but eventually lost in the Hong Kong Third Division League final round and failed to gain promotion.

In the 2011–12 season, they became the runner-up of the Hong Kong Third 'A' Division League. Then in the Hong Kong Third Division League final round, they successfully gained promotion to the Hong Kong Second Division League next season.

In the 2016–17 season, TMFC finished bottom of the league and were relegated back to the Third Division, having lost 15 games and only winning 2 out of the 22 games in the season.

In the 2017–18 season, TMFC finished second bottom in the Third Division and were eliminated from the Hong Kong football league system.

After the expansion of the Third Division to 20 teams, TMFC re-entered the pyramid during the 2021–22 season.

== Honours ==
=== League ===
- Hong Kong Third A Division

Champions (1): 2006–07

- Hong Kong Third District Division

Champions (1): 2004–05
