= Sun Hei SC =

Hong Kong professional football club

Sun Hei
- Full name: Sun Hei Sports Club Limited
- Nickname: Sunrise
- Founded: 1986; 40 years ago
- Chairman: Chow Man Hei
- Head coach: Wong Kin Pong
- League: Hong Kong Second Division
- 2025–26: Third Division, 1st of 16 (promoted)
Home colours	Away colours

Sun Hei Sports Club (Chinese: 晨曦體育會) is a Hong Kong professional football club which currently competes in the Hong Kong Second Division League. The club has a long history in playing in the top flight, but decided to self-relegate in the 2013–14 season after declining to participate in the newly established Hong Kong Premier League.

== History ==
Sun Hei entered the Hong Kong First Division under the name Golden (Chinese: 好易通) in the 1994–95 season. In 1996, Golden under the name Golden XI played against England. England was in Hong Kong preparing for the UEFA Euro 1996 later in the summer. It was in Hong Kong that Paul Gascoigne's famous dentist chair incident took place.

After securing the sponsorship of Xiangxue Pharmaceutical, the club competed in the league under the team name Xiangxue Sun Hei (Chinese: 香雪晨曦) from 2005 to 2007.

In the season 2004–05, Sun Hei achieved The Quadruple, winning all four senior football competitions, including the Hong Kong First Division League, the Senior Shield, the League Cup and the FA Cup. In the 2005 AFC Cup, Sun Hei also got through to the semi-finals stage, the best result for a Hong Kong football club in the competition to date.

In season 2007–08, Sun Hei changed the club name to Convoy Sun Hei (Chinese: 康宏晨曦) as the club obtained sponsorship from Convoy Financial Services, a Hong Kong financial service company.

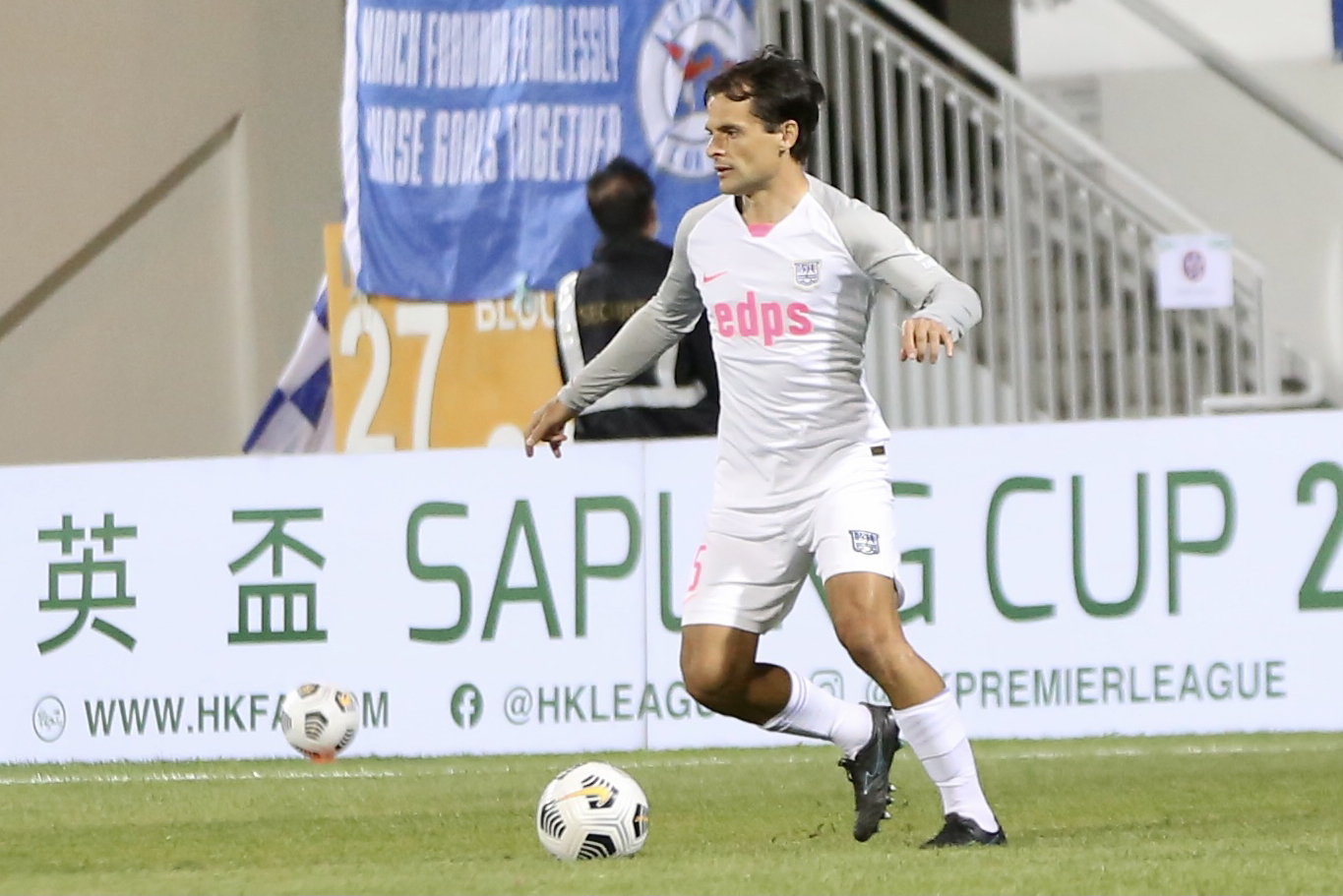
Roberto Júnior played 116 games for Sun Hei SC

In the 2009–10 and 2010–11 seasons, Sun Hei used Tsing Yi Sports Ground as their home ground.

In season 2011–12, the team changed its name to Sunray Cave JC Sun Hei due to sponsorship from Sunray Cave and JC Group, a company owned by Jackie Chan. The team used Mong Kok Stadium as its home ground for this season, but moved back to Tsing Yi Sports Ground for the 2013–14 season. As Sun Hei refused to take part in the NOW TV broadcast agreement, it did not have its home games shown live on Now TV, its personnel was not to be interviewed, it did not share any potential TV income and its sponsors' names were not mentioned on Now TV broadcasts.

In the 2009–10 season, Sun Hei starts using Tsing Yi as their home ground. The first home match against a local strong team, Kitchee, has attracted around 1,200 fans. It is the highest percentage home attendance in this season.

In the 2013–14 season, Sun Hei decided to self-relegate at the end of the season after declining to participate in the newly established Hong Kong Premier League.

During the 2016–17 season, Sun Hei captured their first league title in over ten years winning the title by one point over Wong Tai Sin. However, they declined promotion to the Hong Kong Premier League at the end of the season due to financial difficulties.

A year after winning the First Division, Sun Hei were relegated following a 13th-place finish in the 2017–18 season.

The club finished at the bottom of the table in the 2018–19 season and were relegated to the Hong Kong Third Division.

In the 2022–23 season, they got promoted back to the Hong Kong Second Division after finishing second.

== Name history ==
The club has joined Hong Kong football league system by using the membership of Voicelink since 1994.

- 1994–1999: Golden (Chinese: 好易通)
- 1999–2005: Sun Hei (Chinese: 晨曦)
- 2005–2007: Xiangxue Sun Hei (Chinese: 香雪晨曦)
- 2007–2009: Convoy Sun Hei (Chinese: 康宏晨曦)
- 2009–2011: Sun Hei (Chinese: 晨曦)
- 2011–2014: Sunray Cave JC Sun Hei (Chinese: 日之泉JC晨曦)
- 2014–2017: Sun Hei (Chinese: 晨曦)
- 2017–2018: Glorysky Sun Hei (Chinese: 灝天晨曦)
- 2018– : Sun Hei (Chinese: 晨曦)

== Continental record ==
Season	Competition	Round	Club	Home	Away	Aggregate
2005	AFC Cup	Group D	(Maldives) Club Valencia	6–1	1–1	1st
2005	AFC Cup	Group D	(Singapore) Tampines Rovers	1–1	1–1	1st
2005	AFC Cup	Group D	(Malaysia) Perak FA	2–1	1–0	1st
2005	AFC Cup	Quarter final	(Lebanon) Al Ahed Beirut	3–1	0–1	3–2
2005	AFC Cup	Semi final	(Lebanon) Al-Nejmeh Beirut	2–3	0–3	2–6
2006	AFC Cup	Group E	(Maldives) New Radiant	5–2	2–0	1st
2006	AFC Cup	Group E	(Singapore) Home United	0–1	2–0	1st
2006	AFC Cup	Group E	(Malaysia) Perlis FA	0–0	2–1	1st
2006	AFC Cup	Quarter final	(Jordan) Al-Faisaly	1–1	1–1	2–2 (4–5 p)
2007	AFC Cup	Group D	(Maldives) Victory SC	2–0	2–0	1st
2007	AFC Cup	Group D	(Vietnam) Hoa Phat Hanoi	7–4	2–1	1st
2007	AFC Cup	Group D	(Malaysia) Negeri Sembilan FA	2–0	0–1	1st
2007	AFC Cup	Quarter final	(Jordan) Al-Wahdat	0–1	1–3	1–4
2013	AFC Cup	Group F	(Maldives) New Radiant	0–3	0–1	3rd
2013	AFC Cup	Group F	(Indonesia) Persibo Bojonegoro	8–0	3–3	3rd
2013	AFC Cup	Group F	(Myanmar) Yangon United	1–3	0–2	3rd

== Honours ==
=== League ===
- Hong Kong First Division
  - Champions (4): 2001–02, 2003–04, 2004–05, 2016–17
- Hong Kong Third Division
  - Champions (1): 2025–26

=== Cup Competitions ===
- Hong Kong Senior Shield
  - Champions (2): 2004–05, 2011–12
- Hong Kong FA Cup
  - Champions (3): 2002–03, 2004–05, 2005–06
- Hong Kong League Cup
  - Champions (4): 2002–03, 2003–04, 2004–05, 2008–09
- Hong Kong FA Cup Junior Division
  - Champions (2): 2015–16, 2016–17

== References and notes ==
Awards
Preceded by Hong Kong national rugby union team	Hong Kong Sports Stars Award; Team Only Sport; 2005	Succeeded by Hong Kong national cricket team
