= Ornament (football club) =

- Full name: HK Gold & Silver Ornament Workers and Merchants General Union
- Founded: 1948
- League: Hong Kong Third Division League
- 2025–26: Third Division, 13th of 16th
Home colours	Away colours

Ornament (Chinese: 首飾) is a Hong Kong football club which currently competes in the Hong Kong Third Division League. Formed in 1948 by HK Gold & Silver Ornament Workers and Merchants General Union, the club has competed as high as the second tier of Hong Kong football.

== History ==
In the 1986–87 season, Ornament was the bottom team of Hong Kong Third B Division League. According to the rules, Ornament would have been disqualified for a year. However, Ornament requested a waiver of this requirement and the Hong Kong Football Association later accepted the request.

In the 2001–02 season, Ornament finished second in the Third Division, having been promoted to the Hong Kong Second Division.

In the 2004–05 season, Ornament was placed 11th of the 12 teams in the Second Division, having been relegated to the Hong Kong Third Division League after competing 3 seasons in the Hong Kong Second Division League.

In the 2010–11 season, Ornament was placed 17th of the 19 teams in the Hong Kong Third A Division League.

In the 2023–24 season, Ornament finished bottom in the Hong Kong Third Division League and was eliminated from the Hong Kong football league system.
