= Hong Kong Third Division League =

Men's association football league in Hong Kong

- Founded: 1951
- Country: Hong Kong
- Confederation: AFC
- Number of clubs: 16 (2025–26)
- Level on pyramid: 4 (2014–); 3 (1951–2014)
- Promotion to: Hong Kong Second Division
- Domestic cup: FA Cup Junior Division
- Current champions: Sun Hei (1st title) (2025–26)
- Most championships: Jardine SA, Five-One-Seven (3)
- Website: HKFA website
- Current: 2026–27 Hong Kong Third Division

Hong Kong Third Division League is the fourth-highest division overall in the Hong Kong football league system under the organization of Hong Kong Football Association.

Starting with the 2012–13 season, the two divisions of the Hong Kong Third Division League were merged into one. Teams of the Third Division League in the 2012–13 team were the 2 final round losing team and the 3rd to 10th placed teams of Hong Kong Third A Division League, along with the 3rd and 4th placed teams of Hong Kong Third District Division League. The remaining teams from Hong Kong Third A Division League and Hong Kong Third District Division League competed in Hong Kong Fourth Division League for the 2012–13 and 2013–14 seasons before the reformation was completed.

Prior to the 2012–13 season, the Third Division was divided into two parallel leagues: Hong Kong Third 'A' Division League and Hong Kong Third 'District' Division League. The first one was competed by club teams while the later one was played by teams sent by each District Council of Hong Kong. The top two teams in each league entered into the Third Division League Final Round to compete for the two promotion places to Hong Kong Second Division.

== Format & rules ==
- Every team plays every other team in the league, home and away. The top two teams in the table at the end of the season earn the right to be promoted to the Second Division. Meanwhile, the bottom team in the table will not be permitted to enter a team in the league system for the following season.
- No foreign players are allowed to be registered by any of the teams.
- Each team shall field at least two U22 players on the pitch at any given time.

== Past winners ==
=== As a 4th Tier League ===
Season	Champions	1st Runner-up	2nd Runner-up
2014–15	Tung Sing	Central & Western	St. Joseph's
2015–16	Hoi King	Central & Western	St. Joseph's
2016–17	Happy Valley	Wing Go Fu Moon	GFC Friends
2017–18	North District	Leaper St. Joseph's	Kwok Keung
2018–19	CFCSSHK	Kwai Tsing	Kui Tan
2019–20	Abandoned due to COVID-19 pandemic in Hong Kong		
2020–21	King Mountain	Sun Hei	WSE
2021–22	Abandoned due to COVID-19 pandemic in Hong Kong		
2022–23	WSE	Sun Hei	Fukien
2023–24	Supreme FC	Tsuen Wan	Double Flower
2024–25	Kui Tan	Gospel	Sui Tung
2025–26	Sun Hei	Double Flower	Tsun Tat

== See also ==
- Hong Kong Third 'A' Division League
- Hong Kong Third 'District' Division League
- Hong Kong Fourth Division League
- The Hong Kong Football Association
