= Kui Tan SC =

Kui Tan
- Full name: Kui Tan Sports Club 駒騰體育會
- League: Hong Kong First Division
- 2025–26: Second Division, 1st of 16 (promoted)
Home colours	Away colours

Kui Tan Sports Club (Chinese: 駒騰體育會) is a Hong Kong football club which currently competes in the Hong Kong First Division League.

== History ==
In 1975–76, Kui Tan won the Hong Kong Third A Division title, the first trophy in the club's history.

In 1977–78, Kui Tan finished runners up in the Hong Kong Second Division title and were promoted into the Hong Kong First Division for the first time. They also won the Hong Kong Junior Shield, the first cup competition victory in club history.

During their maiden season in the First Division, Kui Tan achieved a respectable fifth-place finish. The following season, 1979–80, the club were mired in a race for survival in the league with HKFC and Yuen Long. In the final match of the season against HKFC, keeper Lo Kwok Wah committed a crucial foul in the box leading to a penalty and goal for HKFC. The loss meant that Kui Tan would finish one point behind HKFC in the table and thus, were relegated.

In the 1989–90 season, Kui Tan finished 4th in the Second Division but were promoted after champions Mei Ching and runners up Fukien both declined promotion.

During the 1992–93 season, Kui Tan finished second last in the table and were due to be relegated. However, Ernest Borel folded and Kui Tan were permitted to remain.

Kui Tan would once again finish second last in 1994–95 and were relegated along with bottom dwellers Kitchee. The following year, they became runners-up in the Second Division but ultimately declined promotion. They have yet to come as close to the top flight since.

In the 2007–08 season, Kui Tan were relegated to the Hong Kong Third Division following a last place finish.

Kui Tan were promoted back into the Second Division after winning the 2024–25 Third Division. The club lost only two matches all season.

== Honours ==
=== League ===
- Hong Kong Second Division

Champions (1): 2025–26

- Hong Kong Third Division

Champions (2): 1975–76, 2024–25

=== Cup Competitions ===
- Hong Kong Junior Shield

Champions (1): 1977–78
