= Sai Kung Friends FC =

Sai Kung Friends
- Full name: Sai Kung Friends Football Club
- Founded: 2008
- League: Hong Kong Second Division
- 2025–26: Second Division, 6th of 16
Home colours	Away colours

Sai Kung Friends Football Club (Chinese: 西貢朋友足球會) is a Hong Kong football club which currently competes in the Hong Kong Second Division League.

== History ==
In 1997–98, they finished third in Hong Kong Second Division, but due to first and second HKFC and Jung Fuk gave up on promotion to Hong Kong First Division. Sai Kung Friends were promoted to Hong Kong First Division for the first time.

Although having Brazilian striker, Tomy Adriano Giacomeli on the team, their overall strength was rather weak. Of the 8 teams in the 1998-99 First Division, they ranked 7th. However, HKFC and Fire Services both declined promotion, allowing Friends to remain in the First Division. In 1999–2000, striker Tomy Adriano Giacomeli transferred to Happy Valley, Sai Kung Friends' strength continued to decline. Finally, after finishing seventh place in the top league for two seasons in a row, Sai Kung Friends announced retirement from football rather than accept a demotion back to lower divisions.

In 2004–05, Sai Kung Friends rejoined Hong Kong Third A Division League under the name of Derico Friends. They received first place in the Third Division and promoted to Hong Kong Second Division League once again. But in 2005–06, they received last place in the Second Division and was demoted back to Hong Kong Third A Division League after only one season.

After finishing in third place in the 2016–17 season, Friends were promoted into the Second Division after a decade-long exodus in the lowest tier of Hong Kong football. Their achievement did not last long as they were relegated the following year in the 2017–18 season.

After finishing second in the 2024–25 Third Division, Friends were promoted back into the Second Division for the first time in 7 years.

== Honours ==
=== League ===
- Hong Kong Third Division

Champions (1): 2004–05

=== Cup Competitions ===
- Hong Kong Junior Shield

Champions (1): 1997–98
