= Sai Kung District SA =

Sai Kung
- Full name: Sai Kung District Association
- Founded: 2000; 26 years ago
- Ground: Jockey Club HKFA Football Training Centre
- Chairman: Cheung Kwok Hang
- League: Hong Kong Third Division
- 2025–26: Third Division, 7th of 16
- Website: https://www.facebook.com/%E8%A5%BF%E8%B2%A2%E5%8D%80%E8%B6%B3%E7%90%83%E9%9A%8A-Sai-Kung-Football-Team-100897409011679/
Home colours	Away colours

Sai Kung District Sports Association (Chinese: 西貢區體育會) is a Hong Kong district sports association of Sai Kung District which currently competes in the Hong Kong Third Division League.

The club plays the majority of its home matches at Sai Kung Tang Shiu Kin Sports Ground.

== History ==
Sai Kung District began fielding a football team in the Hong Kong football league system in 2003 as part of a Hong Kong Football Association initiative to involve district representative teams. Sai Kung were part of a group of 11 districts who participated in the inaugural season of this project.

During the 2007–08, Sai Kung were able to recruit former Hong Kong national under-23 football team members Leung Sing Kit and Lee Wai Wo as coaches, as well as actor Jerry Lamb as a player.

During the 2008–09 Sai Kung were the runners up of the Hong Kong Third District Division League, winning a tie breaker over Sham Shui Po but they fell short of promotion as they lost all three of the promotion playoff group stage matches.

The HKFA reorganized the football league pyramid in advance of the 2012–13 season, unifying the Third Division A League and the Third Division District League. This meant that Sai Kung were placed in the 2012–13 Hong Kong Fourth Division based on their previous season's results.

The club won its first trophy during the 2013–14 season when it captured the Fourth Division title.

The club then had back-to-back promotions, getting promoted to the Second Division, then finished second to get promoted to the Hong Kong First Division.

== Honours ==
=== League ===
- Hong Kong Fourth Division
  - Champions (1): 2013–14
