= Fukien AC =

Hong Kong multi-sports club

Fukien
- Full name: Fukien Athletic Club
- Founded: 16 January 1925; 101 years ago
- General Manager: Drax Chan
- Website: https://www.facebook.com/fukienfootball/
Home colours	Away colours	Third colours

Fukien Athletic Club (Chinese: 香港福建體育會) was a Hong Kong multi-sports club, known for its football team.

== History ==
Fukien Athletic Club was founded in 1925. At the early period, the club was funded by Chinese businessman and philanthropist Tan Kah Kee, who heralded from Fujian, as well as by group of Fujian immigrants. The club entered the Hong Kong football league system in 1930.

In 1990, Fukien won their first trophy, capturing the Junior Shield. The club won their first league title nine years later, winning the Hong Kong Third A Division for 1998–99.

Three years later, Fukien won the 2001–02 Hong Kong Second Division title and were promoted into the top flight for the first time. Despite having a lower budget than most of their peers, Fukien pulled off several upsets in the Hong Kong First Division including a 2–1 victory of Happy Valley in 2004. During this period, the club were managed by future Kitchee head coach Chu Chi Kwong and featured players such as Chiu Chun Kit, Wong Chin Hung and Chu Wai Lam.

Following a second from the bottom finish in 2004–05, Fukien were relegated to the Second Division. In 2009–10, the club fell to the Third Division after a second last place finish.

During the 2016–17 season, Fukien finished fourth in the table and were promoted to the Second Division. The following season, in 2017–18 season, the club finished at the bottom of the table and were promptly relegated back to the Third Division.

Following the 2025–26 season, Fukien withdrew from the Hong Kong league system.

== Honours ==
=== League ===
- Hong Kong Second Division
  - Champions (1): 2001–02
- Hong Kong Third A Division
  - Champions (1): 1998–99

=== Cup competitions ===
- Hong Kong Junior Shield
  - Champions (3): 1989–90, 2000–01, 2006–07
