= 2011–12 South China AA season =

South China AA
2011–12 season
- Chairman: Steven Lo
- Head Coach: Ján Kocian
- Home ground: Hong Kong Stadium
- First Division: 3rd
- FA Cup: Quarter-finals
- League Cup: Semi-finals
- Senior Shield: Runners-up
- Top goalscorer: League: Joel (5 goals); All: Joel (6 goals)
- Highest home attendance: 3,979 (18 December vs Kitchee, First Division League)
- Lowest home attendance: 969 (10 February vs Hong Kong Sapling, First Division League)
- Average home league attendance: 2,404
Home colours	Away colours

South China AA will seek to win the Hong Kong First Division League championship after they failed to win it last year as Kitchee won. South China are competing in the First Division League, Senior Shield, FA Cup, and League Cup.

== Key events ==
- 17 June 2011: Chairman Steven Lo announced that Chiu Chun Kit and Poon Yiu Cheuk have transferred to Citizen and Sham Shui Po respectively.
- 28 June 2011: Chairman Steven Lo announced that South China appointed Ján Kocian as their new head coach. Ex-caretaker Chan Ho Yin has switched to be assistant coach.
- 30 June 2011: South China announced that 4 youth team players, Kot Cho Wai, Li Yim Lam, Cheung Chun Hei and Chan Pak Hang, are promoted to the first team.
- 21 July 2011: Chairman Steven Lo announced that South China has sealed the deal of Brazilian forward Leonel Alvim Neto.
- 26 July 2011: Chairman Steven Lo announced that South China has signed Canadian left back Paris Nakajima-Farran, who is also a Japanese descent.
- 21 August 2011: Leonel Alvim Neto leaves the club due to the uselessness for the team.
- 26 August 2011: Chairman Steven Lo announced that South China has signed Curacaoan forward Dyron Daal.
- 25 November 2011: South China and English Premier League club Tottenham Hotspur announced the renewal of their Club Partnership at a press conference held on 25 November 2011 at Jumbo Kingdom, Hong Kong.
- 29 December 2011: Chairman Steven Lo announced that 3 new players would join the club, including 2 Brazilian, Dhiego de Souza Martins and João Emir Porto Pereira, who were suggested by Brazilian club Internacional. The third one is Yeo Jeehoon, a South Korean.
- 7 January 2012: Chairman Steven Lo announced that Dyron Daal and Paris Nakajima-Farran, who joined the club at the beginning of the season, are released by the club.
- 23 January 2012: Serbian forward Mateja Kežman played for South China in 2012 Asian Challenge Cup after he announced to end his footballer career on 26 January in Hong Kong.

== Player ==
=== First Team squad ===
As of 26 August 2011.

Note: Flags indicate national team as defined under FIFA eligibility rules; some limited exceptions apply. Players may hold more than one non-FIFA nationality.

No.	Pos.	Nation	Player
1	GK	HKG	Yapp Hung Fai
2	DF	HKG	Lee Chi Ho
3	DF	KOR	Yeo Jeehoon
5	MF	HKG	Bai He
6	DF	HKG	Wong Chin Hung
7	FW	HKG	Chan Siu Ki (vice-captain)
8	MF	HKG	Xu Deshuai
9	MF	HKG	Lee Wai Lim
10	FW	HKG	Au Yeung Yiu Chung
11	MF	HKG	Li Haiqiang (captain)
12	MF	HKG	Man Pei Tak
15	DF	HKG	Chan Wai Ho
16	MF	HKG	Leung Chun Pong

No.	Pos.	Nation	Player
18	MF	HKG	Kwok Kin Pong
19	FW	BRA	Dhiego de Souza Martins
20	MF	BRA	João Emir Porto Ferreira
21	MF	BRA	Edgar Aldrighi Júnior
22	FW	BRA	Giovane
23	GK	HKG	Zhang Chunhui
25	MF	BRA	Wellingsson de Souza
26	MF	HKG	Chan Pak Hang
30	DF	BRA	Joel
31	FW	HKG	Cheng Lai Hin
32	GK	HKG	Fan Chun Yip
33	DF	HKG	Ng Wai Chiu

=== On loan ===
Note: Flags indicate national team as defined under FIFA eligibility rules; some limited exceptions apply. Players may hold more than one non-FIFA nationality.

No.	Pos.	Nation	Player
—	DF	HKG	Lau Nim Yat (at TSW Pegasus)
—	MF	HKG	Kot Cho Wai (at Hong Kong Sapling)

No.	Pos.	Nation	Player
—	FW	HKG	Li Yim Lam (at Hong Kong Sapling)
—	DF	HKG	Cheung Chun Hei (at Hong Kong Sapling)

== Transfers ==
=== In ===
Squad #	Position	Player	Transferred from	Fee	Date	Team	Source
20	MF	(Hong Kong) Kot Cho Wai	Youth Team		30 June 2011	South China	
19	FW	(Hong Kong) Li Yim Lam	Youth Team		30 June 2011	South China	
35	DF	(Hong Kong) Cheung Chun Hei	Youth Team		30 June 2011	South China	
26	MF	(Hong Kong) Chan Pak Hang	Youth Team		30 June 2011	South China	
17	FW	(Brazil) Leonel Alvim Noto	Sport Club São Paulo	Free Transfer	21 July 2011	South China	
21	MF	(Brazil) Edgar Aldrighi Júnior	Farroupilha	Free Transfer		South China	
3	DF	(Canada) Paris Nakajima-Farran	AC Horsens	Free Transfer	26 July 2011	South China	
27	FW	(Curaçao) Dyron Daal	North Queensland Fury	Free Transfer	26 August 2011	South China	
19	FW	(Brazil) Dhiego de Souza Martins	Operário Ferroviário Esporte Clube	Free Transfer	30 December 2011	South China	
20	MF	(Brazil) João Emir Porto Ferreira	Brasil de Pelotas	Free Transfer	30 December 2011	South China	
3	DF	(South Korea) Yeo Jeehoon	Myongji University	Free Transfer	30 December 2011	South China	

=== Out ===
Squad #	Position	Player	Transferred to	Fee	Date	Source
12	MF	(England) Nicky Butt	Retired		12 May 2011	
38	FW	(Serbia) Mateja Kežman	FC BATE Borisov	Free transfer	30 May 2011	
3	DF	(Hong Kong) Poon Yiu Cheuk	Sham Shui Po	Free transfer	17 June 2011	
4	DF	(Hong Kong) Chiu Chun Kit	Citizen	Free Transfer	17 June 2011	
20	DF	(Hong Kong) Lau Nim Yat	TSW Pegasus	On Loan	12 July 2011	
17	FW	(Brazil) Leonel Alvim Noto	Free Agent	Free Transfer	21 August 2011	
19	FW	(Hong Kong) Li Yim Lam	Hong Kong Sapling	Loan	17 August 2011	
20	MF	(Hong Kong) Kot Cho Wai	Hong Kong Sapling	Loan	17 August 2011	
35	DF	(Hong Kong) Cheung Chun Hei	Hong Kong Sapling	Loan	17 August 2011	
3	DF	(Hong Kong) Paris Nakajima-Farran	Not Attached	Released	7 January 2012	
27	FW	(Curaçao) Dyron Daal	Not Attached	Released	7 January 2012	
33	DF	(Hong Kong) Ng Wai Chiu	TSW Pegasus	Loan	26 January 2012	

== Stats ==
=== Squad stats ===
				Total				HKFDL		Senior Challenge Shield		FA Cup		League Cup		
N	Pos.	Name	Nat.	GS	App	Gls	Min	App	Gls	App	Gls	App	Gls	App	Gls	Notes
1	GK	Yapp Hung Fai	(Hong Kong)	14	14	-13	1260	10	-9	4	-4					(−) GA
23	GK	Zhang Chunhui	(Hong Kong)	1	1		90	1								(−) GA
32	GK	Fan Chun Yip	(Hong Kong)													(−) GA
2	RB	Lee Chi Ho	(Hong Kong)	10	10		885	6		4						
3	LB	Yeo Jeehoon	(South Korea)	2	2		90	2								Joined in January 2011
6	LB	Wong Chin Hung	(Hong Kong)	10	11		894	7		4						
15	CB	Chan Wai Ho	(Hong Kong)	12	12		1080	9		3						
30	CB	Joel Bertoti Padilha	(Brazil)	11	13	6	1016	9	5	4	1					
	CB	Ng Wai Chiu	(Hong Kong)	5	6	3	405	4	2	2	1					Loaned to TSW Pegasus in January
	LB	Paris Nakajima-Farran	(Canada)	3	3		225	2		1						Released in January 2012
5	DM	Bai He	(Hong Kong)	10	13		838	10		3						
8	RM	Xu Deshuai	(Hong Kong)	6	10	2	565	8	1	2	1					
9	RM	Lee Wai Lim	(Hong Kong)	4	5	1	381	5	1							
10	AM	Au Yeung Yiu Chung	(Hong Kong)	8	11	3	726	8	2	3	1					
11	CM	Li Haiqiang	(Hong Kong)	8	12	1	764	9	1	3						
12	DM	Man Pei Tak	(Hong Kong)	7	9		602	7		2						
16	DM	Leung Chun Pong	(Hong Kong)	9	11		818	9		2						
18	LM	Kwok Kin Pong	(Hong Kong)	13	15	1	1103	11	1	4						
20	CM	João Emir Porto Ferreira	(Brazil)	2	5		180	5								Joined in January 2012
21	DM	Edgar Aldrighi Júnior	(Brazil)													
25	LM	Wellingsson de Souza	(Brazil)	4	12	4	627	8	4	4						
26	CM	Chan Pak Hang	(Hong Kong)		2		20	2								
7	FW	Chan Siu Ki	(Hong Kong)	9	14	5	949	10	3	4	2					
19	FW	Dhiego de Souza Martins	(Brazil)	2	2	3	136	2	3							Joined in January 2012
22	SS	Giovane Alves da Silva	(Brazil)	7	11	2	613	9	2	2						
31	FW	Cheng Lai Hin	(Hong Kong)	3	5	1	219	2	1	3						
	CF	Dyron Daal	(Curaçao)	3	4	1	263	3	1	1						Released in January 2012

Last updated: 4 February 2012
Ordered by Position
0 shown as blank

=== Top scorers ===
Place	Position	Nationality	Number	Name	First Division League	Senior Challenge Shield	FA Cup	League Cup	Total
1	DF	(Brazil)	30	Joel	5	1	0	0	6
2	FW	(Hong Kong)	7	Chan Siu Ki	3	2	0	0	5
3	MF	(Brazil)	25	Wellingsson de Souza	4	0	0	0	4
=4	FW	(Brazil)	20	Dhiego de Souza Martins	3	0	0	0	3
=4	MF	(Hong Kong)	10	Au Yeung Yiu Chung	2	1	0	0	3
=4	FW	(Hong Kong)		Ng Wai Chiu	2	1	0	0	3
=7	MF	(Hong Kong)	8	Xu Deshuai	1	1	0	0	2
=7	FW	(Brazil)	22	Giovane Alves da Silva	2	0	0	0	2
=9	MF	(Hong Kong)	9	Lee Wai Lim	1	0	0	0	1
=9	MF	(Hong Kong)	11	Li Haiqiang	1	0	0	0	1
=9	MF	(Hong Kong)	18	Kwok Kin Pong	1	0	0	0	1
=9	FW	(Hong Kong)	31	Cheng Lai Hin	1	0	0	0	1
=9	FW	(Curaçao)		Dyron Daal	1	0	0	0	0
				TOTALS	27	6	0	0	33

=== Disciplinary record ===
Number	Nation	Position	Name	First Division League			Senior Challenge Shield			FA Cup			League Cup			Total		
Number	Nation	Position	Name	Yellow card	(yellow card) (yellow-red card)	Red card	Yellow card	(yellow card) (yellow-red card)	Red card	Yellow card	(yellow card) (yellow-red card)	Red card	Yellow card	(yellow card) (yellow-red card)	Red card	Yellow card	(yellow card) (yellow-red card)	Red card
2	(Hong Kong)	DF	Lee Chi Ho	3	0	0	0	0	0	0	0	0	0	0	0	3	0	0
3	(South Korea)	DF	Yeo Jeehoon	0	1	0	0	0	0	0	0	0	0	0	0	0	1	0
5	(Hong Kong)	MF	Bai He	2	0	0	1	0	0	0	0	0	0	0	0	3	0	0
7	(Hong Kong)	FW	Chan Siu Ki	2	0	0	0	0	0	0	0	0	0	0	0	2	0	0
8	(Hong Kong)	MF	Xu Deshuai	1	0	0	0	0	0	0	0	0	0	0	0	1	0	0
10	(Hong Kong)	MF	Au Yeung Yiu Chung	0	0	0	1	0	0	0	0	0	0	0	0	1	0	0
11	(Hong Kong)	MF	Li Haiqiang	3	0	0	1	0	0	0	0	0	0	0	0	4	0	0
12	(Hong Kong)	MF	Man Pei Tak	1	0	1	1	0	0	0	0	0	0	0	0	2	0	1
16	(Hong Kong)	MF	Leung Chun Pong	1	0	0	1	0	0	0	0	0	0	0	0	2	0	0
12	(Hong Kong)	MF	Man Pei Tak	1	0	0	1	0	0	0	0	0	0	0	0	2	0	0
22	(Brazil)	FW	Giovane	2	0	0	0	0	0	0	0	0	0	0	0	2	0	0
25	(Brazil)	MF	Souza	2	0	0	0	0	0	0	0	0	0	0	0	2	0	0
30	(Brazil)	DF	Joel Bertoti Padilha	2	0	0	3	0	0	0	0	0	0	0	0	5	0	0
	(Hong Kong)	DF	Ng Wai Chiu	2	0	0	1	0	0	0	0	0	0	0	0	3	0	0
			TOTALS	21	1	1	9	0	0	0	0	0	0	0	0	30	1	1

|} Last updated: 10 February 2012
Source: Match reports in Competitive matches
Only competitive matches
(yellow card) = Number of bookings; (second yellow card) = Number of sending offs after a second yellow card; (red card) = Number of sending offs by a direct red card.

=== Staff ===
Position	Staff
Manager	Steven Lo
Deputy manager	Hui Ka Chuen
Head Coach	Ján Kocian

Last updated: 12 July 2011

== Competitions ==
=== Overall ===
Competition	Started round	Current position / round	Final position / round	First match	Last match
First Division	—	4	3	13 August	
Senior Challenge Shield	Quarter-final	Final	Final	29 October	
FA Cup	—	—	Quarter-final		
League Cup	Quarter-final	Quarter-final	Semi-final	25 February	

Updated to match played 20 May 2012
Source: Competitions

=== First Division League ===
==== Classification ====
Pos	Team	Pld	W	D	L	GF	GA	GD	Pts	Qualification or relegation
1	Kitchee	18	13	3	2	44	20	+24	42	2013 AFC Cup Group stage
2	TSW Pegasus	18	12	2	4	48	26	+22	38	
3	South China	18	10	6	2	47	17	+30	36	
4	Sunray Cave JC Sun Hei	18	8	4	6	29	22	+7	28	2013 AFC Cup Group stage (Note: via 2011–12 Hong Kong Senior Challenge Shield)
5	Citizen	18	5	8	5	29	31	−2	23	

Updated to match(es) played on 20 May 2012. Source:
Rules for classification: 1) points; 2) head-to-head points; 3) head-to-head goal difference; 4) head-to-head goals scored; 5) goal difference; 6) number of goals scored.

==== Results summary ====
Overall								Home						Away					
Pld	W	D	L	GF	GA	GD	Pts	W	D	L	GF	GA	GD	W	D	L	GF	GA	GD
18	10	6	2	47	17	+30	36	5	3	1	20	5	+15	5	3	1	27	12	+15

Last updated: 19 May 2012.

==== Results by round ====
Round	1	2	3	4	5	6	7	8	9	10	11	12	13	14	15	16	17	18
Ground	H	A	H	H	A	A	H	H	A	A	H	H	A	A	A	H	A	H
Result	L	W	D	W	W	L	W	W	D	W	W	D	W	D	D	W	W	D
Position	7	6	5	5	3	5	4	4	3	3	3	3	3	3	3	3	3	3

Updated to match(es) played on 20 May 2012. Source:
A = Away; H = Home; W = Win; D = Draw; L = Loss

== Fixtures and results ==
=== Friendly ===
16 July 2011	South China (Hong Kong)	2–0	(Hong Kong) Kwun Tong	Happy Valley
	Giovane; Au Yeung Yiu Chung			Stadium: (Hong Kong) Happy Valley Recreation Ground

23 July 2011	South China (Hong Kong)	4–1	(Hong Kong) Sham Shui Po	Happy Valley
	Giovane; Cheng		Goal	Stadium: (Hong Kong) Happy Valley Recreation Ground

30 July 2011	South China (Hong Kong)	1–1	(Hong Kong) TSW Pegasus	Happy Valley
	Goal		Goal	Stadium: (Hong Kong) Happy Valley Recreation Ground

7 August 2011	Ajou University (South Korea)	1–2	(Hong Kong) South China	Busan
	?		Souza; Kwok	Stadium: (South Korea)

9 August 2011	Gyeongnam (South Korea)	3–3	(Hong Kong) South China	Busan
	? ? ?	Report	Giovane; Cheng	Stadium: (South Korea)

13 August 2011	Gyeongnam B (South Korea)	0–0	(Hong Kong) South China	Busan
				Stadium: (South Korea)

==== 2012 Asian Challenge Cup ====
24 January 2012 semi-final	South China (Hong Kong)	1–1 (1–3 p)	(Japan) Shimizu S-Pulse	So Kon Po
18:30(GMT+8)	Kežman (yellow card) 35'; Chan Siu Ki 67'	Report(In Chinese); Rerpot(In English)	26' Toshiyuki Takagi; (yellow card) 68' Takuma Edamura; (yellow card) 73' Yasuhiro Hiraoka; (yellow card) 84' Shinji Ono; (yellow card) 88' Inukai Tomoya; (yellow card) 90' Keisuke Iwashita	Stadium: Hong Kong Stadium (Capacity:40,000); Attendance: 9,879; Referee: Liu Kwok Man; Assistant referees: Chow Chun Kit; Cheng Oi Cho; Fourth official: Pau Sai Yin
	Penalties
	Joel (penalty missed); Wong Chin Hung (penalty scored); Chan Siu Ki (penalty missed); João Emir (penalty missed)		(penalty scored) Ono; (penalty missed) Omae; (penalty scored) Brosque; (penalty missed) Ito; (penalty scored) Takagi

26 January 2012 3rd Place Playoff	South China (Hong Kong)	1–1 (3–1 p)	(China) Guangzhou R&F	So Kon Po
18:00(GMT+8)	Joel (yellow card) 28'; Chan Wai Ho 42'	Report	90' Li Zhe	Stadium: Hong Kong Stadium (Capacity:40,000); Attendance: 10,610; Referee: Tong Kui Sum; Assistant referees: Chan Shui Hung; Ho Wai Sing; Fourth official: Pau Sai Yin
	Penalties
	Wong Chin Hung (penalty scored); Au Yeung Yiu Chung (penalty missed); Leung Chun Pong (penalty missed); Kežman (penalty missed)		(penalty scored) Lu Lin; (penalty missed) Yu Guijun; (penalty scored) Xu Bo; (penalty scored) Wu Weian

=== First Division League ===
10 September 2011 Week 1	South China	1–2	Tuen Mun	So Kon Po, Hong Kong
17:30(GMT+8)	Li Haiqiang (yellow card) 65'; Souza 75'	Report	12' Trnavac; (yellow card) 28' Chan Hin Kwong; 38' Bhengu; (yellow card) 78' Vujosevic; (yellow card) 78' Mirko	Stadium: Hong Kong Stadium (Capacity:40,000); Attendance: 3,126; Referee: Ng Kai Lam; Assistant referees: Cheng Oi Cho; Poon Ming Fai; Fourth official: Yau Ho Fai, Leo

18 September 2011 Week 2	Sham Shui Po	0–2	South China	Sham Shui Po, Hong Kong
14:30(GMT+8)		Report	6' Wellingsson de Souza; (yellow card) 9' Ng Wai Chiu; 13' Dyron Daal	Stadium: Sham Shui Po Sports Ground (Capacity:2,194); Attendance: 2,185; Referee: Ng Kai Lam; Assistant referees: Wong Chi Tang, Charlton; Chung Ming Sang; Fourth official: Lam Shing Yan, Franky

23 September 2011 Week 3	South China	0–0	Sunray Cave JC Sun Hei	So Kon Po, Hong Kong
20:00(GMT+8)	Lee Chi Ho (yellow card) 68'; Giovane (yellow card) 76'; Bai He (yellow card) 82'	Report	Cheng Siu Wai (yellow card) 39'	Stadium: Hong Kong Stadium (Capacity:40,000); Attendance: 2,776; Referee: Ng Chiu Kok; Assistant referees: Chan Shui Hung; Lam Nai Kei; Fourth official: Tong Kui Sum

15 October 2011 Week 4	South China	3–0	Biu Chun Rangers	So Kon Po, Hong Kong
17:30(GMT+8)	Joel (yellow card) 23'; Li Haiqiang (yellow card) 24'; Lee Wai Lim 50'; Ng Wai Chiu 81'; Giovane 86'; Man Pei Tak (yellow card) 89'	Report	(yellow card) 55' Ondoua; (yellow card) 79' Lam Hok Hei	Stadium: Hong Kong Stadium (Capacity:40,000); Attendance: 1,496; Referee: Wong Chi Tang, Charlton; Assistant referees: Chow Chun Kit; Lui Siu Chuen; Fourth official: Cheng Oi Cho

22 October 2011 Week 5	Hong Kong Sapling	0–5	South China	Mong Kok, Hong Kong
17:30(GMT+8)	Andreu Ramos Isus (yellow card) 31'; Eugene Mbome (yellow card) 63'	Report	5' Giovane; 36' Ng Wai Chiu; 42', 58' (yellow card) 31' Wellingsson de Souza; 51' Kwok Kin Pong; (yellow card) 71' Xu Deshuai	Stadium: Mong Kok Stadium (Capacity:6,680); Attendance: 3,994; Referee: Pau Sai Yin; Assistant referees: Lam Chi Ho; Lui Siu Chuen; Fourth official: Cheung Kwok Hung

20 November 2011 Week 6	TSW Pegasus	2–1	South China	Yuen Long, Hong Kong
17:30 (GMT+8)	Carrijo 47'; Itaparica (pen.), 56'; Takada (yellow card) 67'; Dodd (red card); Godfred (yellow card) 87'	Report	(yellow card) 17' Joel; 21' (yellow card) 36' Li Haiqiang; (yellow card) 67' Chan Siu Ki; (yellow card) 67' Souza	Stadium: Yuen Long Stadium (Capacity:4,932); Attendance: 2,397; Referee: Ng Chiu Kok; Assistant referees: Pau Sai Yin; Chung Ming Sang; Fourth official: Lui Siu Chuen

3 December 2011 Week 7	South China	3–0	Wofoo Tai Po	So Kon Po, Hong Kong
17:30 (GMT+8)	Joel 74'; Xu Deshuai 84'; Chan Siu Ki (yellow card) 80' (goal) 90'	Report	(yellow card) 26' Lui Chi Hing; (yellow card) 27' Lima; (yellow card) 48' Clayton; (yellow card) 77' Christian Annan	Stadium: Hong Kong Stadium (Capacity:40,000); Attendance: 1,700; Referee: Liu Kwok Man; Assistant referees: Pau Sai Yin; Poon Ming Fai; Fourth official: Poon Chung Kit

18 December 2011 Week 8	South China	2–0	Kitchee	So Kon Po, Hong Kong
17:30 (GMT+8)	Joel 43', 63' (pen.); Bai He (yellow card) 44'	Report	(yellow card) 62' Dani; (yellow card) 72' Liu Quankun	Stadium: Hong Kong Stadium (Capacity:40,000); Attendance: 3,979; Referee: Liu Kwok Man; Assistant referees: Chan Shui Hung; Poon Ming Fai; Fourth official: Chow Chun Kit

6 January 2012 Week 9	Citizen	3–3	South China	Mong Kok, Hong Kong
20:00(GMT+8)	Paulinho 3' (yellow card) 71'; Tam Lok Hin (yellow card) 13'; Nakamura 41'; So Loi Keung (yellow card) 78'; Sham Kwok Keung 85' (yellow card) 90+4' (yellow-red card) 90+4'; Campion (yellow card) 89'	Report	(yellow card) 18' (yellow-red card) 32' Yeo Jeehoon; (yellow card) 45' Ng Wai Chiu; 58' Au Yeung Yiu Chung; 66', 90+3' Chan Siu Ki; (yellow card) 76' Lee Chi Ho	Stadium: Mong Kok Stadium (Capacity:6,680); Attendance: 2,351; Referee: Wong Chi Tang, Charlton; Assistant referees: Chan Shui Hung; Lui Siu Chuen; Fourth official: Ho Wai Sing

4 February 2012 Week 10	Sunray Cave SC Sun Hei	2–4	South China	Mong Kok, Hong Kong
14:30(GMT+8)	Michael Luk 47'; Li Hang Wui (yellow card) 66'; Cheng Siu Wai (yellow card) 82'; Barry 90'; Roberto (yellow card) 90+2'	Report	7' Dhiego; 18' Chan Siu Ki; 64' (pen.) Joel; (yellow card) 82' Leung Chun Pong; 85' Au Yeung Yiu Chung	Stadium: Mong Kok Stadium (Capacity:6,680); Attendance: 3,676; Referee: Tong Kui Sum; Assistant referees: Ng Kai Lam; Ho Wai Sing; Fourth official: Lam Nai Kei

10 February 2012 Week 11	South China	4–0	Hong Kong Sapling	So Kon Po, Hong Kong
20:00(GMT+8)	Dhiego 28', 31'; Joel Bertoti Padilha 41' (pen.); Man Pei Tak (red card) 43'; Cheng Lai Hin 65'; Lee Chi Ho (yellow card) 67'	Report	(yellow card) 45' (yellow-red card) 47' Kot Cho Wai; (yellow card) 56' Alex; (yellow card) 68' Ramos; (yellow card) 80' Chan Cham Hei	Stadium: Hong Kong Stadium (Capacity:40,000); Attendance: 969; Referee: Wong Chi Tang, Charlton; Assistant referees: Chow Chun Kit; Yu Chun San; Fourth official: Lam Nai Kei

4 March 2012 Week 12	South China	1–1	Sham Shui Po	So Kon Po, Hong Kong
17:30(GMT+8)	Lee Wai Lim 25'; Bai He (yellow card) 58' (yellow-red card) 59'; Xu Deshuai (yellow card) 79'	Summary	Lau Cheuk Hin 80'; Alexander Santos (yellow card) 89'	Stadium: Hong Kong Stadium (Capacity:40,000); Attendance: 947

17 March 2012 Week 13	Wofoo Tai Po	0–4	South China	Tai Po, Hong Kong
14:30(GMT+8)	Li Chun Yip (yellow card) 22'	Summary	Joel 25' (pen.); Xu Deshuai 31'; Giovane 53'; Cheng Lai Hin (yellow card) 72'; Lee Wai Lim 75'	Stadium: Tai Po Sports Ground (Capacity:3,000)

29 March 2012 Week 14	Kitchee	2–2	South China	Tseung Kwan O, Hong Kong
20:00(GMT+8)	Lam Ka Wai 13'; Yago 53'; Wang Zhenpeng (yellow card) 72'; Lo Kwan Yee (yellow card) 75'; Fernando Recio (yellow card) 85'; Roberto Losada (yellow card) 90'	Summary	Bai He (yellow card) 40'; Joel (yellow card) 55'; Giovane 73'; Dhiego de Souza Martins 87' (yellow card) 87'	Stadium: Tseung Kwan O Sports Ground (Capacity:3,500); Attendance: 2,751

8 April 2012 Week 15	Tuen Mun	1–1	South China	Tuen Mun, Hong Kong
14:30(GMT+8)	Yip Tsz Chun 16'; Roberto Fronza (yellow card) 68'; Law Ka Lok (yellow card) 76'	Summary	Joel (yellow card) 34' (goal) 43'	Stadium: Tuen Mun Tang Shiu Kin Sports Ground (Capacity:2,280); Attendance: 1,758

22 April 2012 Week 16	South China	4–0	TSW Pegasus	So Kon Po, Hong Kong
17:30(GMT+8)	Xu Deshuai 22'; Giovane 33', 41', 46'; Li Haiqiang (yellow card) 64'; Lee Chi Ho (yellow card) 70'	Summary	Lau Nim Yat (yellow card) 30'	Stadium: Hong Kong Stadium (Capacity:40,000); Attendance: 2,037

5 May 2012 Week 17	Biu Chun Rangers	2–5	South China	Mong Kok, Hong Kong
14:30(GMT+8)	Sandro 33' (pen.) (yellow card) 50'; Louison Moukoko (yellow card) 48'; Lam Hok Hei 50'; Guy Junior Ondoua (yellow card) 50'	Summary	Dhiego de Souza Martins 8'; Giovane 43', 47'; Au Yeung Yiu Chung 59'; Joel 70'; Li Haiqiang (yellow card) 70'	Stadium: Mong Kok Stadium (Capacity:6,680)

19 May 2012 Week 18	South China	2–2	Citizen	So Kon Po, Hong Kong
14:30(GMT+8)	Joel (yellow card) 37' (goal) 56'; Dhiego de Souza Martins (yellow card) 45'; Chan Wai Ho (yellow card) 53' (goal) 67'; Bai He (yellow card) 54'		Yeung Chi Lun (yellow card) 39'; Sham Kwok Keung 45', 49'; Paulinho Piracicaba (yellow card) 54'	Stadium: Hong Kong Stadium (Capacity:40,000); Attendance: 862

=== Senior Challenge Shield ===
==== Quarter-final ====
29 October 2011 1st leg	Sham Shui Po	1–1	South China	Mong Kok
17:30(GMT+8)	Leung Kwun Chung (yellow card) 30'; Fernando (yellow card) 34'; Lo Kong Wai 42' (yellow card) 74'; Fong Pak Lun (yellow card) 79'		7' Ng Wai Chiu; (yellow card) 33' Joel; (yellow card) 78' Li Haiqiang	Stadium: Mong Kok Stadium (Capacity:6,680); Attendance: 2,105; Referee: Wong Chi Tang, Charlton; Assistant referees: Tong Kui Sum; Poon Ming Fai; Fourth official: Chan Ming Siu

24 November 2011 2nd leg	South China	2–1 (3–2 agg.)	Sham Shui Po	So Kon Po
20:00(GMT+8)	Ng Wai Chiu (yellow card) 46'; Man Pei Tak (yellow card) 58'; Xu Deshuai 62'; Chan Siu Ki 88'	Report	(yellow card) 49' Fernando; (yellow card) 64' Lam Ngai Tong; 78' Fong Pak Lun	Stadium: Hong Kong Stadium (Capacity:40,000); Attendance: 1,219; Referee: Cheng Oi Cho; Assistant referees: Chan Shui Hung; Chow Chun Kit; Fourth official: Ho Wai Sing

==== Semi-final ====
10 December 2011 1st leg	TSW Pegasus	2–2	South China	Yuen Long
14:30(GMT+8)	Chan Ming Kong (yellow card) 16'; Lee Wai Lun (yellow card) 32'; Godfred Karikari (yellow card) 55'; Fan Qunxiao (yellow card) 63'; Cheung Kin Fung 66'; Deng Jinghuang (yellow card) 77'; Itaparica 88' (yellow card) 90'		(yellow card) 9' Joel Bertoti Padilha; 65' Chan Siu Ki; 67' Au Yeung Yiu Chung; (yellow card) 69' Leung Chun Pong	Stadium: Yuen Long Stadium (Capacity:4,932); Attendance: 2,092; Referee: Tong Kui Sum; Assistant referees: Liu Kwok Man; Poon Ming Fai; Fourth official: Lam Nai Kei

25 December 2011 2nd leg	South China	1–0 (3–2 agg.)	TSW Pegasus	So Kon Po
14:30(GMT+8)	Joel 4' (yellow card) 24'; Bai He (yellow card) 31'; Au Yeung Yiu Chung (yellow card) 36'	Report	(yellow card) 27' Lau Nim Yat; (yellow card) 47' Carrijó; (yellow card) 64' Dodd	Stadium: Hong Kong Stadium (Capacity:40,000); Attendance: 3,972; Referee: Ng Kai Lam; Assistant referees: Chow Chun Kit; Chung Ming Sang; Fourth official: Lam Shing Yan, Franky

==== Final ====
18 February 2012 Final	Sunray Cave JC Sun Hei	1–1 (5–3 p)	South China	So Kon Po
17:45(GMT+8)	Milovanovic 52' (yellow card) 89'; Li Hang Wui (red card) 56'; Pak Wing Chak (yellow card) 63'; Cheng Siu Wai (yellow card) 77'; Hou Yu (yellow card) 120'	Report	54' Chan Wai Ho; (yellow card) 80' Dhiego	Stadium: Hong Kong Stadium (Capacity:40,000); Attendance: 6,234; Referee: Liu Kwok Man; Assistant referees: Chow Chun Kit; Chung Ming Sang; Fourth official: Tong Kui Sum; Man of the Match: Hou Yu (Sunray Cave JC Sun Hei)
	Penalties
	Roberto (penalty scored); Michael Luk (penalty scored); Wong Chun Yue (penalty scored); Kilama (penalty scored); Pan Jia (penalty scored)		Wong Chin Hung (penalty scored); Joel (penalty scored); Giovane Alves da Silva (penalty missed); Chan Wai Ho (penalty scored)
