= List of Hong Kong Top Footballers =

The following are the lists of Hong Kong Top Footballers, an annual award in Hong Kong football. The award is given to the eleven best players to have featured in that season's top association football division in Hong Kong (the Hong Kong First Division League until 2014 and from then on the Hong Kong Premier League).

== Winners ==
=== 1990–91 ===
Position	Nationality	Name	Club
GK	(Hong Kong)	Lau Tung Ping	Happy Valley
DF	(Hong Kong)	Tam Ah Fook	Happy Valley
DF	(Hong Kong)	Chan Ping On	South China
DF	(Hong Kong)	Ku Kam Fai	South China
DF	(Hong Kong)	Tang Chu Shing	Happy Valley
MF	(Hong Kong)	Lee Kin Wo	Lai Sun
MF	(England)	Russell Milton	Double Flower
MF	(Hong Kong)	Leslie Santos	South China
MF	(Australia)	Ross Greer	South China
FW	(Hong Kong)	Tim Bredbury	Lai Sun
FW	(England)	Dale Tempest	South China

=== 1991–92 ===
Position	Nationality	Name	Club
GK	(England)	Iain Hesford	Eastern
DF	(England)	Steve Neville	South China
DF	(Hong Kong)	Chan Ping On (2)	South China
DF	(Hong Kong)	Ku Kam Fai (2)	South China
DF	(Hong Kong)	Pang Kam Chuen	South China
MF	(Australia)	Craig Foster	Ernest Borel
MF	(Hong Kong)	Wong Kwok On	Ernest Borel
MF	(Hong Kong)	Leslie Santos (2)	South China
MF	(Hong Kong)	Lee Kin Wo (2)	Eastern
FW	(New Zealand)	Paul Nixon	Eastern
FW	(England)	Dale Tempest (2)	Eastern

=== 1992–93 ===
Position	Nationality	Name	Club
GK	(England)	Iain Hesford (2)	Eastern
DF	(Hong Kong)	Lo Kai Wah	Eastern
DF	(England)	Tim O'Shea	Eastern
DF	(Hong Kong)	Chiu Chun Ming	Eastern
DF	(Hong Kong)	Chan Wai Chiu	South China
MF	(Hong Kong)	Chiu Chung Man	South China
MF	(Hong Kong)	Lee Kin Wo (3)	Eastern
MF	(Hong Kong)	Tam Siu Wai	Eastern
FW	(New Zealand)	Paul Nixon (2)	Eastern
FW	(Bosnia and Herzegovina)	Anto Grabo	South China
FW	(England)	Dale Tempest (3)	Eastern

=== 1993–94 ===
Position	Nationality	Name	Club
GK	(England)	Iain Hesford (3)	Eastern
DF	(Hong Kong)	Cheung Chi Tak	Instant-Dict
DF	(Scotland)	Roddy Manley	Instant-Dict
DF	(England)	Tim O'Shea (2)	Eastern
MF	(Hong Kong)	Lee Wai Man	Eastern
MF	(Hong Kong)	Lo Kai Wah (2)	Eastern
MF	(Hong Kong)	Lee Kin Wo (4)	Eastern
MF	(Hong Kong)	Tam Siu Wai (2)	Eastern
MF	(Australia)	Ross Greer (2)	Eastern
FW	(England)	Dale Tempest (4)	Eastern
MF	(Hong Kong)	Shum Kwok Pui	South China

=== 1994–95 ===
Position	Nationality	Name	Club
GK	(Russia)	Viktor Derbunov	Happy Valley
DF	(Hong Kong)	Lo Kai Wah (3)	Eastern
DF	(England)	Mike Duxbury	Golden
DF	(Hong Kong)	Chan Chi Keung	Eastern
MF	(Hong Kong)	Cheng Siu Chung	Eastern
MF	(Hong Kong)	Lee Kin Wo (5)	Eastern
MF	(Hong Kong)	Tam Siu Wai (3)	Rangers
MF	(Hong Kong)	Lee Wai Man (2)	Eastern
MF	(China)	Wu Qunli	South China
FW	(England)	Dale Tempest (5)	Eastern
FW	(Scotland)	Lee Bullen	Golden

=== 1995–96 ===
Position	Nationality	Name	Club
GK	(Netherlands)	Werner Kooistra	South China
DF	(Hong Kong)	Yau Kin Wai	South China
DF	(Hong Kong)	Ku Kam Fai (3)	South China
DF	(Hong Kong)	Chan Ping On (3)	Instant-Dict
DF	(England)	Paul Masefield	Sing Tao
MF	(Hong Kong)	Lee Kin Wo (6)	South China
MF	(Portugal)	Pedro Xavier	South China
MF	(Hong Kong)	Shum Kwok Pui (2)	South China
MF	(Hong Kong)	Chan Chi Hong	South China
DF	(Hong Kong)	Ng Chun Chung	Frankwell
FW	(Hong Kong)	Cheng Siu Chung (2)	South China

=== 1996–97 ===
Position	Nationality	Name	Club
GK	(Netherlands)	Werner Kooistra (2)	South China
DF	(Hong Kong)	Chan Chi Keung (2)	Sing Tao
DF	(Hong Kong)	Ku Kam Fai (4)	South China
DF	(Brazil)	Aurélio	South China
MF	(Hong Kong)	Sung Linyung	South China
MF	(Hong Kong)	Lo Kai Wah (4)	Sing Tao
DF	(England)	Tim O'Shea (3)	Instant-Dict
MF	(China)	Wu Qunli (2)	South China
MF	(Hong Kong)	Cheng Siu Chung (3)	South China
FW	(Hong Kong)	Tim Bredbury (2)	Instant-Dict
FW	(Hong Kong)	Au Wai Lun	South China

=== 1997–98 ===
Position	Nationality	Name	Club
GK	(England)	Peter Guthrie	Happy Valley
DF	(Hong Kong)	Yau Kin Wai (2)	South China
DF	(England)	Tim O'Shea (4)	Instant-Dict
DF	(England)	Shaun Teale	Happy Valley
DF	(England)	Martin Kuhl	Happy Valley
DF	(Hong Kong)	Lo Kai Wah (5)	Happy Valley
MF	(Bulgaria)	Dimitre Kalkanov	Instant-Dict
MF	(Hong Kong)	Leslie Santos (3)	South China
MF	(Hong Kong)	Cheng Siu Chung (4)	Instant-Dict
FW	(Hong Kong)	Au Wai Lun (2)	South China
FW	(England)	Ian Baird	Instant-Dict

=== 1998–99 ===
Position	Nationality	Name	Club
GK	(England)	Mike Leonard	South China
DF	(Brazil)	Cristiano Cordeiro	South China
DF	(Brazil)	Emerson	Sai Kung Friends
DF	(Hong Kong)	Wong Wai Tak	Happy Valley
DF	(Hong Kong)	Yau Kin Wai (3)	South China
MF	(Hong Kong)	Cheng Siu Chung (5)	South China
MF	(Hong Kong)	Chiu Chung Man (2)	Yee Hope
MF	(Hong Kong)	Kwok Yue Hung	Happy Valley
MF	(Hong Kong)	Wong Chi Keung	Yee Hope
FW	(Scotland)	Paul Ritchie	Yee Hope
FW	(Brazil)	Tomy	Happy Valley

=== 1999–2000 ===
Position	Nationality	Name	Club
GK	(Hong Kong)	Chan Ka Ki	Orient & Yee Hope Union
DF	(Federal Republic of Yugoslavia)	Dejan Antonić	Instant-Dict
DF	(Hong Kong)	Poon Yiu Cheuk	Happy Valley
DF	(England)	Stephen Watson	Orient & Yee Hope Union
DF	(Hong Kong)	Yau Kin Wai (4)	South China
MF	(Hong Kong)	Cheng Siu Chung (6)	South China
MF	(Hong Kong)	Cheung Sai Ho	Happy Valley
MF	(Scotland)	Gary McKeown	Sun Hei
MF	(Paraguay)	Gerardo Laterza	South China
FW	(Brazil)	Leandro	Sai Kung
FW	(Brazil)	Tomy (2)	Happy Valley

=== 2000–01 ===
Position	Name	Club
GK	(Hong Kong) Xiao Guoji	Instant-Dict
DF	(Brazil) Cristiano Cordeiro (2)	South China
DF	(Federal Republic of Yugoslavia) Dejan Antonić (2)	Instant-Dict
DF	(Cameroon) Gerard	Orient & Yee Hope Union
DF	(Hong Kong) Lo Kai Wah (6)	Happy Valley
MF	(Brazil) Araujo	Orient & Yee Hope Union
MF	(Hong Kong) Cheung Sai Ho (2)	Happy Valley
MF	(Brazil) Filho	South China
MF	(Scotland) Gary McKeown (2)	Sun Hei
FW	(Hong Kong) Au Wai Lun (3)	South China
FW	(Indonesia) Rochy Putiray	Instant-Dict

=== 2001–02 ===
Position	Name	Club
GK	(Hong Kong) Fan Chun Yip	Happy Valley
DF	(Brazil) Cristiano Cordeiro (3)	South China
DF	(Cameroon) Gerard (2)	Happy Valley
DF	(Hong Kong) Lo Kai Wah (7)	Happy Valley
DF	(Hong Kong) Poon Yiu Cheuk (2)	Happy Valley
DF	(Hong Kong) Yau Kin Wai (5)	South China
MF	(Brazil) Filho (2)	South China
MF	(Brazil) Anilton	Rangers
MF	(Scotland) Gary McKeown (3)	Sun Hei
FW	(Nigeria) Cornelius Udebuluzor	Rangers
FW	(Saint Kitts and Nevis) Keith Gumbs	Happy Valley

=== 2002–03 ===
Position	Name	Club
GK	(Hong Kong) Fan Chun Yip (2)	Happy Valley
DF	(Brazil) Cristiano Cordeiro (4)	South China
DF	(Hong Kong) Szeto Man Chun	South China
DF	(Hong Kong) Yau Kin Wai (6)	South China
MF	(Hong Kong) Chan Chi Hong (2)	South China
MF	(South Korea) Kim Pan-Gon	Rangers
MF	(Hong Kong) Lee Kin Wo (7)	South China
MF	(Hong Kong) Leung Shing Kit	Happy Valley
FW	(Hong Kong) Au Wai Lun (4)	South China
FW	(Cameroon) Gerard (3)	Happy Valley
FW	(Saint Kitts and Nevis) Keith Gumbs (2)	Happy Valley

=== 2003–04 ===
Position	Name	Club
GK	(Hong Kong) Fan Chun Yip (3)	Happy Valley
GK	(Hong Kong) Xiao Guoji (2)	Kitchee
DF	(Cameroon) Gerard (4)	Happy Valley
DF	(Hong Kong) Lau Chi Keung	Sun Hei
DF	(Hong Kong) Luk Koon Pong	South China
DF	(Hong Kong) Poon Yiu Cheuk (3)	Happy Valley
MF	(Hong Kong) Cheung Sai Ho (3)	Happy Valley
MF	(Hong Kong) Chu Siu Kei	Sun Hei
MF	(Hong Kong) Lee Kin Wo (8)	Sun Hei
MF	(Hong Kong) Lee Wai Man (3)	Happy Valley
FW	(Cameroon) Julius Akosah	Sun Hei

=== 2004–05 ===
Position	Name	Club
GK	(Hong Kong) Fan Chun Yip (4)	Happy Valley
DF	(Brazil) Cristiano Cordeiro (5)	Sun Hei
DF	(Cameroon) Gerard (5)	Happy Valley
DF	(Brazil) Andre	Sun Hei
DF	(Hong Kong) Lau Chi Keung (2)	Sun Hei
MF	(Hong Kong) Cheung Sai Ho (4)	Happy Valley
MF	(Hong Kong) Lee Kin Wo (9)	Sun Hei
MF	(Hong Kong) Lee Wai Man (4)	Happy Valley
MF	(Cameroon) Wilfed Bamnjo	Kitchee
FW	(China) Ma Shuai	Citizen
FW	(Saint Kitts and Nevis) Keith Gumbs (3)	Kitchee

=== 2005–06 ===
Position	Name	Club
GK	(Hong Kong) Fan Chun Yip (5)	Happy Valley
DF	(Brazil) Cristiano Cordeiro (6)	Sun Hei
DF	(Hong Kong) Gerard (6)	Happy Valley
DF	(Hong Kong) Man Pei Tak	Rangers
DF	(Hong Kong) Poon Yiu Cheuk (4)	Happy Valley
MF	(Hong Kong) Cheung Sai Ho (5)	Happy Valley
MF	(Hong Kong) Lee Kin Wo (10)	Sun Hei
MF	(Hong Kong) Lee Wai Man (5)	Happy Valley
MF	(Brazil) Lico	Sun Hei
FW	(Hong Kong) Au Wai Lun (5)	South China
FW	(Saint Kitts and Nevis) Keith Gumbs (4)	Kitchee

=== 2006–07 ===
Position	Name	Club
GK	(China) Zhang Chunhui	South China
DF	(Hong Kong) Chan Wai Ho	South China / Rangers
DF	(Hong Kong) Cristiano Cordeiro (7)	Sun Hei
DF	(Hong Kong) Gerard (7)	Happy Valley
DF	(Serbia) Ivan Jević	Kitchee
MF	(China) Li Haiqiang	South China
MF	(Hong Kong) Lo Chi Kwan	Sun Hei
MF	(Brazil) Monteiro	Happy Valley
FW	(Ghana) Christian Annan	Tai Po
FW	(Brazil) Detinho	South China
FW	(Saint Kitts and Nevis) Keith Gumbs (5)	Kitchee

=== 2007–08 ===
Position	Name	Club
GK	(Brazil) Luciano	Eastern
DF	(Hong Kong) Cristiano Cordeiro (8)	Sun Hei
DF	(Nigeria) Festus Baise	Citizen
DF	(Hong Kong) Lee Chi Ho	South China
MF	(Brazil) Edgar Aldrighi Júnior	Tai Po
MF	(North Macedonia) Goran Stankovski	Kitchee
MF	(China) Li Haiqiang (2)	South China
FW	(Brazil) Detinho (2)	South China
FW	(Brazil) Giovane	Sun Hei
FW	(Brazil) Rodrigo	Eastern
FW	(China) Wang Xuanhong	Citizen

=== 2008–09 ===
Position	Player	Team
DF	(Hong Kong) Wong Chin Hung	South China
MF	(Brazil) Itaparica	Pegasus
MF	(Hong Kong) Li Haiqiang (3)	South China
MF	(Hong Kong) Lee Kin Wo (11)	Eastern
MF	(Hong Kong) Xu Deshuai	Citizen
MF	(Brazil) Edgar Aldrighi Júnior (2)	Tai Po
MF	(Hong Kong) Lee Hong Lim	Pegasus
FW	(Hong Kong) Lee Wai Lim	Tai Po
FW	(Brazil) Tales Schutz	South China
FW	(Hong Kong) Chan Siu Ki	South China
FW	(Brazil) Giovane (2)	Sun Hei

=== 2009–10 ===
Position	Player	Team
GK	(Hong Kong) Yapp Hung Fai	Pegasus
DF	(Hong Kong) Wong Chin Hung (2)	South China
DF	(Nigeria) Festus Baise (2)	Citizen
DF	(Hong Kong) Chan Wai Ho (2)	South China
DF	(Hong Kong) Lee Chi Ho (2)	South China
MF	(Hong Kong) Kwok Kin Pong	South China
MF	(Hong Kong) Li Haiqiang (4)	South China
MF	(Brazil) Itaparica (2)	Pegasus
MF	(Hong Kong) Xu Deshuai (2)	Citizen
FW	(Hong Kong) Chan Siu Ki (2)	South China
FW	(Brazil) Tales Schutz (2)	South China

=== 2010–11 ===
Position	Player	Team
GK	(Hong Kong) Yapp Hung Fai (2)	South China
DF	(Spain) Dani Cancela	Kitchee
DF	(Hong Kong) Lo Kwan Yee	Kitchee
DF	(Spain) Ubay Luzardo	Kitchee
DF	(Hong Kong) Lee Chi Ho (3)	South China
MF	(Hong Kong) Lee Hong Lim (2)	Pegasus
MF	(Hong Kong) Chu Siu Kei (2)	Kitchee
MF	(Hong Kong) Lam Ka Wai	Kitchee
MF	(Brazil) Itaparica (3)	Pegasus
FW	(Spain) Roberto Losada	Kitchee
FW	(Spain) Jordi Tarrés	Kitchee

=== 2011–12 ===
Position	Player	Team
GK	(Hong Kong) Yapp Hung Fai (3)	South China
DF	(Spain) Dani Cancela (2)	Kitchee
DF	(Hong Kong) Lo Kwan Yee (2)	Kitchee
DF	(Pakistan) Zesh Rehman	Kitchee
DF	(Brazil) Joel	South China
MF	(Hong Kong) Lee Hong Lim (3)	Pegasus
MF	(Hong Kong) Chu Siu Kei (3)	Kitchee
MF	(Hong Kong) Lam Ka Wai (2)	Kitchee
MF	(Nigeria) Festus Baise (3)	Citizen
FW	(Spain) Jordi Tarrés (2)	Kitchee
FW	(Japan) Yuto Nakamura	Citizen

=== 2012–13 ===
Position	Player	Team
GK	(Hong Kong) Yapp Hung Fai (4)	South China
DF	(Hong Kong) Kwok Kin Pong (2)	South China
DF	(Hong Kong) Lo Kwan Yee (3)	Kitchee
DF	(Spain) Fernando Recio	Kitchee
DF	(Hong Kong) Chan Wai Ho (3)	South China
MF	(Hong Kong) Lee Hong Lim (4)	South China
MF	(Hong Kong) Lee Wai Lim (2)	South China
MF	(Brazil) Aender	Tai Po
MF	(Hong Kong) Huang Yang	Kitchee
FW	(Spain) Jordi Tarrés (3)	Kitchee
FW	(Japan) Tsuyoshi Yoshitake	Yokohama FC Hong Kong

=== 2013–14 ===
Position	Player	Team
GK	(Hong Kong) Yapp Hung Fai (5)	South China
DF	(Hong Kong) Kwok Kin Pong (3)	South China
DF	(Hong Kong) Lo Kwan Yee (4)	Kitchee
DF	(Hong Kong) Lee Chi Ho (4)	South China
DF	(Serbia) Igor Miović	Pegasus
MF	(Brazil) Wellingsson	Yuen Long
MF	(Spain) Jordi Tarrés (4)	Kitchee
MF	(Hong Kong) Lam Ka Wai (3)	Kitchee
MF	(Hong Kong) Ju Yingzhi	Pegasus
FW	(Spain) Juan Belencoso	Kitchee
FW	(Bosnia and Herzegovina) Admir Raščić	Pegasus

=== 2014–15 ===
Position	Player	Team
GK	(Hong Kong) Yapp Hung Fai (6)	Eastern
DF	(Hong Kong) Cheung Kin Fung	Kitchee
DF	(Hong Kong) Lo Kwan Yee (5)	Kitchee
DF	(Serbia) Bojan Mališić	South China
DF	(Hong Kong) Chan Wai Ho (4)	South China
MF	(Hong Kong) Xu Deshuai (3)	Kitchee
MF	(Cameroon) Mahama Awal	South China
MF	(Hong Kong) Lam Ka Wai (4)	Kitchee
MF	(Croatia) Miroslav Saric	Eastern
FW	(Brazil) Giovane (3)	Eastern
FW	(Spain) Juan Belencoso (2)	Kitchee

=== 2015–16 ===
Position	Player	Team
GK	(Hong Kong) Yapp Hung Fai (7)	Eastern
DF	(Hong Kong) Cheung Kin Fung (2)	Kitchee
DF	(Hong Kong) Lo Kwan Yee (6)	Kitchee
DF	(Serbia) Bojan Mališić (2)	South China
DF	(Hong Kong) Roberto	Eastern
MF	(Hong Kong) Huang Yang (2)	Kitchee
MF	(Brazil) Michel Lugo	Eastern
MF	(Brazil) Fernando	Kitchee
MF	(Brazil) Diego Eli	Eastern
FW	(Brazil) Giovane (4)	Eastern
FW	(Spain) Rufino Segovia	Kitchee

=== 2016–17 ===
Position	Player	Team
GK	(Hong Kong) Yapp Hung Fai (8)	Eastern
DF	(Hong Kong) Wong Tsz Ho	Eastern
DF	(Hong Kong) Helio	Kitchee
DF	(Hong Kong) Roberto (2)	Eastern
DF	(South Korea) Kim Bong-jin	Kitchee
MF	(Hong Kong) Huang Yang (3)	Kitchee
MF	(Hong Kong) Itaparica (4)	Tai Po
MF	(Brazil) Fernando (2)	Kitchee
MF	(Brazil) Diego Eli (2)	Eastern
FW	(Spain) Manolo Bleda	Eastern
FW	(Hong Kong) Sandro	Kitchee

=== 2017–18 ===
Position	Player	Team
GK	(Hong Kong) Wang Zhenpeng	Kitchee
DF	(Hong Kong) Tong Kin Man	Kitchee
DF	(Hong Kong) Fábio Lopes	Yuen Long
DF	(Hong Kong) Cheung Chi Yung	Pegasus
DF	(South Korea) Kim Bong-jin (2)	Kitchee
MF	(Hong Kong) Huang Yang (4)	Kitchee
MF	(Hungary) Krisztián Vadócz	Kitchee
MF	(Brazil) Fernando (3)	Kitchee
MF	(Hong Kong) Wong Wai	Tai Po
FW	(Brazil) Lucas Silva	Kitchee
FW	(Brazil) Everton Camargo	Yuen Long

=== 2018–19 ===
Position	Player	Team
GK	(Hong Kong) Tse Tak Him	Southern
DF	(Hong Kong) Fung Hing Wa	Tai Po
DF	(Hong Kong) Fábio Lopes (2)	Yuen Long
DF	(Brazil) Eduardo Praes	Tai Po
DF	(Hong Kong) Leung Nok Hang	R&F
MF	(Brazil) Fernando (4)	Kitchee
MF	(Hong Kong) James Ha	Southern
MF	(Hong Kong) Chan Siu Kwan	Tai Po
MF	(Hong Kong) Wong Wai (2)	Tai Po
FW	(Brazil) Lucas Silva (2)	Kitchee
FW	(Brazil) Igor Sartori	Tai Po

=== 2019–20 ===
Cancelled due to COVID-19 pandemic in Hong Kong

=== 2020–21 ===
Position	Player	Team
GK	(Hong Kong) Yapp Hung Fai (9)	Eastern
DF	(Hong Kong) Dani Cancela (3)	Kitchee
DF	(Brazil) Eduardo Praes (2)	Eastern
DF	(Brazil) Júnior Goiano	Pegasus
DF	(Hong Kong) Hélio (2)	Kitchee
MF	(Brazil) Marquinhos	Pegasus
MF	(Hong Kong) Ngan Lok Fung	Lee Man
MF	(England) Charlie Scott	Happy Valley
MF	(Brazil) Cleiton	Kitchee
FW	(Montenegro) Dejan Damjanović	Kitchee
FW	(Hong Kong) Sandro (2)	Eastern

=== 2021–22 ===
Cancelled due to COVID-19 pandemic in Hong Kong

=== 2022–23 ===
Position	Player	Team
GK	(Hong Kong) Yapp Hung Fai (10)	Eastern
DF	(Brazil) Gabriel Cividini	Tai Po
DF	(Hong Kong) Hélio (3)	Kitchee
DF	(South Korea) Kim Min-kyu	Rangers
DF	(Hong Kong) Tsui Wang Kit	Lee Man
MF	(Hong Kong) Lam Hin Ting	Rangers
MF	(Brazil) Cleiton (2)	Kitchee
MF	(Brazil) Mikael	Kitchee
FW	(Brazil) Everton Camargo (2)	Lee Man
FW	(Turkmenistan) Ruslan Mingazow	Kitchee
FW	(Hong Kong) Sun Ming Him	Eastern

=== 2023–24 ===
Position	Player	Team
GK	(Hong Kong) Tse Ka Wing	Tai Po
DF	(Brazil) Gabriel Cividini (2)	Tai Po
DF	(Hong Kong) Tsui Wang Kit (2)	Lee Man
DF	(Kyrgyzstan) Tamirlan Kozubayev	Eastern
DF	(Spain) Daniel Almazan	Eastern
MF	(Hong Kong) Chan Siu Kwan (2)	Tai Po
MF	(Brazil) Mikael (2)	Kitchee
MF	(Spain) Marcos Gondra	Eastern
FW	(Spain) Noah Baffoe	Eastern
FW	(Estonia) Henri Anier	Lee Man
FW	(Hong Kong) Everton Camargo (3)	Lee Man

=== 2024–25 ===
Position	Player	Team
GK	(Hong Kong) Yapp Hung Fai (11)	Eastern
DF	(Brazil) Gabriel Cividini (3)	Tai Po
DF	(Hong Kong) Lee Ka Ho	Tai Po
DF	(Hong Kong) Leung Chun Pong	Eastern
DF	(Japan) Ryoya Tachibana	Lee Man
MF	(Hong Kong) Chan Siu Kwan (3)	Tai Po
MF	(Spain) Marcos Gondra (2)	Eastern
MF	(Hong Kong) Fernando (5)	Kitchee
FW	(Spain) Noah Baffoe (2)	Eastern
FW	(Hong Kong) Lau Chi Lok	Rangers
FW	(Hong Kong) Everton Camargo (4)	Lee Man

=== 2025–26 ===
Position	Player	Team
GK	(Hong Kong) Paulo César	Eastern District
DF	(Brazil) Gabriel Cividini (4)	Tai Po
DF	(Brazil) Weverton	Tai Po
DF	(Uzbekistan) Dostonbek Tursunov	Lee Man
DF	(Hong Kong) Kam Chi Kin	Kitchee
MF	(Spain) Asier Illarramendi	Kitchee
MF	(Hong Kong) Tan Chun Lok	Kitchee
MF	(Japan) Yumemi Kanda	Kitchee
FW	(Hong Kong) Everton Camargo (5)	Lee Man
FW	(Brazil) Igor Sartori (2)	Tai Po
FW	(Japan) Yu Okubo	Eastern

== See also ==
- Hong Kong Top Footballer Awards
