= Yapp Hung Fai =

Hong Kong footballer (born 1990)

Yapp Hung Fai 葉鴻輝
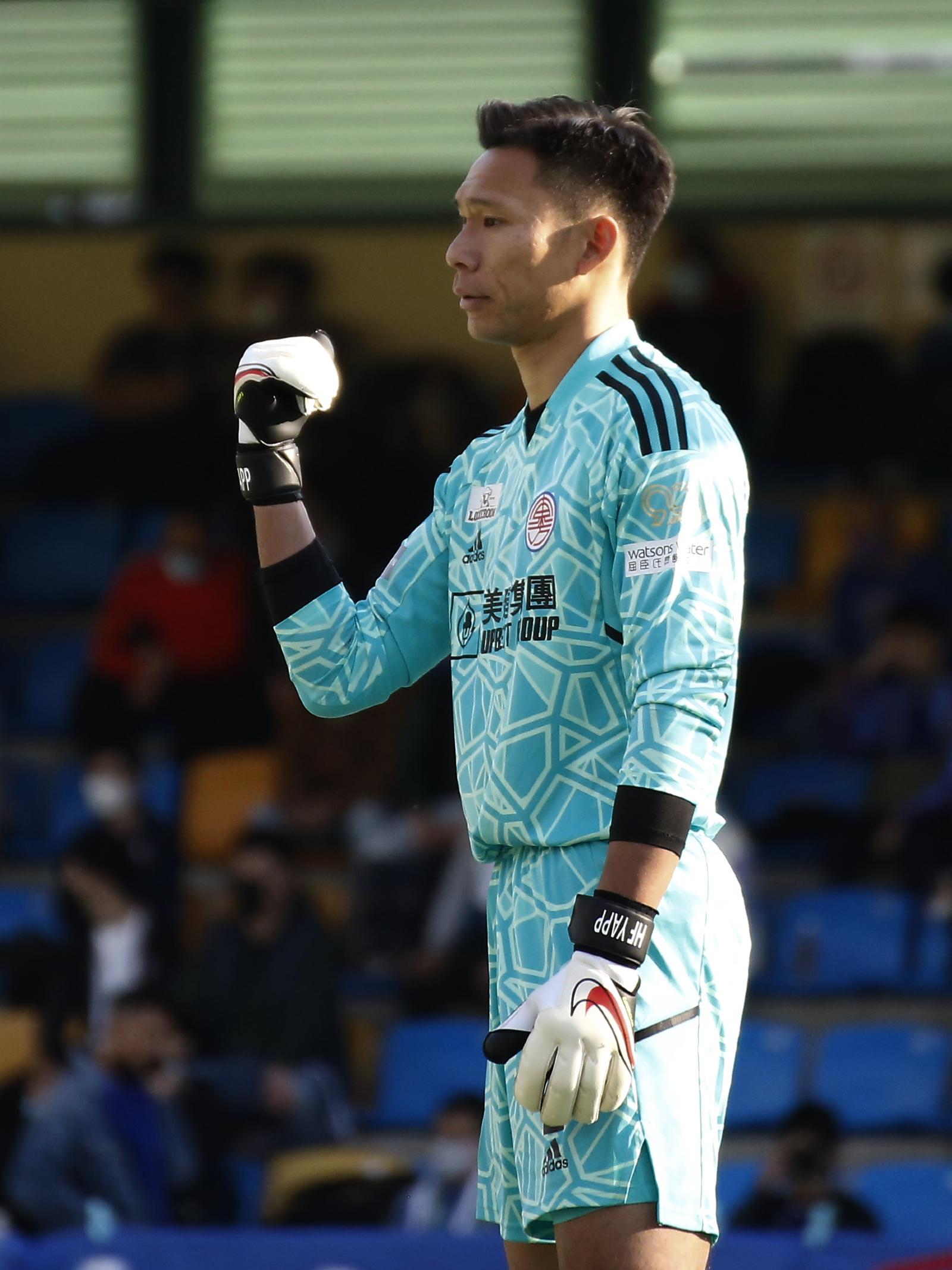
- Yapp with Eastern in 2023

Personal information
- Full name: Yapp Hung Fai
- Date of birth: 21 March 1990 (age 36)
- Place of birth: British Hong Kong
- Height: 1.80 m (5 ft 11 in)
- Position: Goalkeeper

Team information
- Current team: Eastern
- Number: 1

Youth career
- 2005–2007: Hong Kong 09

Senior career*
Years	Team	Apps	(Gls)
2007–2008	Workable	13	(0)
2008–2009	Eastern	21	(0)
2009–2010	Pegasus	16	(0)
2010–2014	South China	57	(0)
2014–	Eastern	200	(0)

International career^{‡}
2009–2014	Hong Kong U-23	17	(0)
2010–2025	Hong Kong	112	(0)
Medal record
Representing Hong Kong
East Asian Games
Gold medal – first place	2009 Hong Kong	Football
- * Club domestic league appearances and goals as of 22 November 2026 ‡ National team caps and goals as of 9 October 2025

Yapp Hung Fai (Chinese: 葉鴻輝; Jyutping: jip^{6} hung^{4} fai^{1}, Cantonese pronunciation: [jip̚˨.hʊŋ˩.fɐj˥]; born 21 March 1990) is a Hong Kong professional footballer who currently plays as a goalkeeper for Hong Kong Premier League club Eastern. He currently keeps the record for being the most capped player of the Hong Kong national football team, with 112 caps in total.

== Club career ==
Born in a Hakka family, Yapp finished his studies at Form 5 level. He was admitted by Queen's College Old Boys Association Secondary School for Form 6 but he gave it up to pursue his football dream. He had already represented Hong Kong at under-17 level.

=== Workable ===
Yapp started his professional career at Workable in 2007 when he was only 17 under coaches Lee Kin Wo and Chan Hiu Ming. His salary was only HK$5,000 per month. During his time at the club, he helped the team to an unexpected 1–0 win against South China in the 2007–08 Hong Kong League Cup.

=== Pegasus ===
Yapp joined Pegasus in 2009. After helping the club beat Citizen 2–1 to win the 2009-10 Hong Kong FA Cup and qualify for the 2011 AFC Cup, Yapp announced that he would join league champions South China along with teammate Lau Nim Yat. Yapp said he decided to join South China before the game, and South China's location would make it easier for him to attend school. He was also not worried about competing with Zhang Chunhui for the starting goalkeeper position.

=== South China ===
In 2010, Yapp moved to South China. On 29 September 2010, during Tottenham Hotspur's chief scout Ian Broomfield's visit to South China, he praised Yapp for his enormous potential. "He [Yapp] is not tall, but his reactions are sharp and he is quick to come out of the box to block strikers. He is also very committed and very well disciplined."

After defeating East Bengal in the 2011 AFC Cup game at home on 14 April 2011, South China striker Mateja Kezman suggested that Yapp has what it takes to play in European football leagues.

During the summer of 2013, Yapp agreed to a 4.5-year contract with Guizhou Renhe. However, his registration was denied by the Chinese Football Association because Yapp did not qualify as a domestic player and as such, would violate the Chinese Super League stipulations which require all keepers to be domestic players.

=== Eastern ===
In June 2014, Yapp returned to Eastern after his contract with South China expired.

In 2016, Yapp helped Eastern win their first Hong Kong Premier League trophy.

On 28 September 2020, Yapp also helped Eastern win the 2019–20 Hong Kong FA Cup. It is the fifth FA cup trophy for Eastern.

On 20 November 2024, Yapp played his 200th match for Eastern.

In the 2024–25 season, Yapp helped Eastern win the FA Cup and Senior Shield trophies.

== International career ==
On 11 February 2010, at the age of 19, Yapp made his senior debut for Hong Kong in a 2010 East Asian Football Championship match against Japan.

In 2011, Yapp took part in the 2014 FIFA World Cup Asian qualification matches for Hong Kong against Saudi Arabia. Hong Kong lost the tie 0–8.

In the 2012 Guangdong-Hong Kong Cup, the first match at Hong Kong Stadium ended 2–2. After the second match ended as 0–0 in Huizhou Stadium, Yapp Hung-Fai saved three penalties in the penalty shoot-out to help Hong Kong win by 5–4. He is once again hailed as Hong Kong's cup winning hero.

On 10 September 2019, Hong Kong played against Iran in a match of 2022 FIFA World Cup Asian qualification. Yapp got his 71st cap for the national team with FIFA "A" international match, making him the most capped player of the team.

On 26 December 2023, Yapp was named in Hong Kong's squad for the 2023 AFC Asian Cup.

On 8 December 2024, Yapp got his 100th cap for the national team after playing against Mongolia in a 2025 EAFF E-1 Football Championship Preliminary Round match.

On 9 October 2025, Yapp was seriously injured during an Asian Cup qualifier against Bangladesh. It was discovered that he had torn the anterior cruciate ligament in his right knee.

== Career statistics ==
=== Club ===
As of 14 May 2023

Appearances and goals by club, season and competition
Club	Season	League			FA Cup		Other Cups		Continental		Total	
Club	Season	Division	Apps	Goals	Apps	Goals	Apps	Goals	Apps	Goals	Apps	Goals
Workable	2007–08	Hong Kong First Division League	13	0	1	0	1 (Note: Appearances in the Senior Shield)	0	0	0	15	0
Eastern	2008–09	Hong Kong First Division League	21	0	1	0	1	0	0	0	23	0
Pegasus	2009–10	Hong Kong First Division League	16	0	3	0	2	0	0	0	21	0
South China	2010–11	Hong Kong First Division League	10	0	2	0	2	0	6 (Note: Appearances in the AFC Cup)	0	20	0
South China	2011–12	Hong Kong First Division League	17	0	1	0	5	0	0	0	23	0
South China	2012–13	Hong Kong First Division League	17	0	5	0	4	0	0	0	26	0
South China	2013–14	Hong Kong First Division League	13	0	2	0	3	0	2	0	20	0
South China	Total		107	0	15	0	18	0	8	0	148	0
Eastern	2014–15	Hong Kong Premier League	14	0	3	0	3	0	0	0	20	0
Eastern	2015–16	Hong Kong Premier League	15	0	1	0	3	0	0	0	19	0
Eastern	2016–17	Hong Kong Premier League	20	0	2	0	4 (Note: Appearances in the Sapling Cup and Senior Shield)	0	5 (Note: Appearances in the AFC Champions League)	0	31	0
Eastern	2017–18	Hong Kong Premier League	16	0	1	0	5	0	1	0	23	0
Eastern	2018–19	Hong Kong Premier League	18	0	1	0	2	0	0	0	21	0
Eastern	2019–20	Hong Kong Premier League	13	0	4	0	3	0	0	0	20	0
Eastern	2020–21	Hong Kong Premier League	16	0	0	0	2 (Note: Appearances in the Sapling Cup)	0	2	0	20	0
Eastern	2021–22	Hong Kong Premier League	4	0	2	0	1	0	2	0	9	0
Eastern	2022–23	Hong Kong Premier League	18	0	2	0	3	0	0	0	23	0
Eastern	Total		134	0	16	0	26	0	10	0	186	0
Career total			241	0	31	0	44	0	18	0	334	0

=== International ===
As of 9 October 2025

Appearances and goals by national team and year
National team	Year	Apps	Goals
Hong Kong	2010	5	0
Hong Kong	2011	5	0
Hong Kong	2012	10	0
Hong Kong	2013	7	0
Hong Kong	2014	8	0
Hong Kong	2015	11	0
Hong Kong	2016	8	0
Hong Kong	2017	8	0
Hong Kong	2018	6	0
Hong Kong	2019	8	0
Hong Kong	2020	0	0
Hong Kong	2021	3	0
Hong Kong	2022	3	0
Hong Kong	2023	6	0
Hong Kong	2024	14	0
Hong Kong	2025	10	0
Total		112	0

#	Date	Venue	Opponent	Result	Conceded	Captain	Competition
1	11 February 2010	National Stadium, Tokyo, Japan	Japan	0–3	-3		2010 East Asian Football Championship
2	14 February 2010	National Stadium, Tokyo, Japan	China	0–2	-2		2010 East Asian Football Championship
3	3 March 2010	Hong Kong Stadium, Hong Kong	Yemen	0–0	0		2011 AFC Asian Cup qualification
4	9 October 2010	Kaohsiung National Stadium, Kaohsiung, Taiwan	Philippines	4–2	-2		2010 Long Teng Cup
5	12 October 2010	Kaohsiung National Stadium, Kaohsiung, Taiwan	Chinese Taipei	1–1	-1		2010 Long Teng Cup
6	9 February 2011	Shah Alam Stadium, Kuala Lumpur	Malaysia	0–2	-2		Friendly
7	23 July 2011	Prince Mohamed bin Fahd Stadium, Dammam, Saudi Arabia	Saudi Arabia	0–3	-3		2014 FIFA World Cup qualification
8	28 July 2011	Siu Sai Wan Sports Ground, Hong Kong	Saudi Arabia	0–5	-5		2014 FIFA World Cup qualification
9	30 September 2011	Kaohsiung National Stadium, Kaohsiung, Taiwan	Philippines	3–3	-3		2011 Long Teng Cup
10	4 October 2011	Kaohsiung National Stadium, Kaohsiung, Taiwan	Chinese Taipei	6–0	0		2011 Long Teng Cup
11	29 February 2012	Mong Kok Stadium, Hong Kong	Chinese Taipei	5–1	-1		Friendly
12	1 June 2012	Hong Kong Stadium, Hong Kong	Singapore	1–0	0		Friendly
13	10 June 2012	Mong Kok Stadium, Hong Kong	Vietnam	1–2	-2		Friendly
14	15 August 2012	Jurong West Stadium, Jurong West, Singapore	Singapore	0–2	-2		Friendly
15	16 October 2012	Mong Kok Stadium, Mong Kok, Hong Kong	Malaysia	0–3	-3		Friendly
16	14 November 2012	Shah Alam Stadium, Shah Alam, Malaysia	Malaysia	1–1	-1		Friendly
17	1 December 2012	Mong Kok Stadium, Mong Kok, Hong Kong	Guam	2–1	-1		2013 EAFF East Asian Cup Preliminary Competition Round 2
18	3 December 2012	Mong Kok Stadium, Mong Kok, Hong Kong	Australia	0–1	-1		2013 EAFF East Asian Cup Preliminary Competition Round 2
19	7 December 2012	Hong Kong Stadium, So Kon Po, Hong Kong	Chinese Taipei	2–0	0		2013 EAFF East Asian Cup Preliminary Competition Round 2
20	9 December 2012	Hong Kong Stadium, So Kon Po, Hong Kong	North Korea	0–4	-4		2013 EAFF East Asian Cup Preliminary Competition Round 2
21	6 February 2013	Pakhtakor Stadium, Uzbekistan	Uzbekistan	0–0	0		2015 AFC Asian Cup qualification
22	22 March 2013	Mong Kok Stadium, Mong Kok, Hong Kong	Vietnam	1–0	0		2015 AFC Asian Cup qualification
23	4 June 2013	Mong Kok Stadium, Mong Kok, Hong Kong	Philippines	0–1	-1		Friendly
24	10 September 2013	Mong Kok Stadium, Mong Kok, Hong Kong	Singapore	1–0	0		Friendly
25	15 October 2013	Hong Kong Stadium, So Kon Po, Hong Kong	United Arab Emirates	0–4	-4		2015 AFC Asian Cup qualification
26	15 November 2013	Mohammed Bin Zayed Stadium, Abu Dhabi, United Arab Emirates	United Arab Emirates	0–4	-4		2015 AFC Asian Cup qualification
27	19 November 2013	Hong Kong Stadium, So Kon Po, Hong Kong	Uzbekistan	0–2	-2	(c)	2015 AFC Asian Cup qualification
28	5 March 2014	Mỹ Đình National Stadium, Hanoi, Vietnam	Vietnam	1–3	-3		2015 AFC Asian Cup qualification
29	6 September 2014	Lach Tray Stadium, Hai Phong, Vietnam	Vietnam	1–3	-3		Friendly
30	9 September 2014	Hougang Stadium, Singapore	Singapore	0–0	0		Friendly
31	10 October 2014	Mong Kok Stadium, Mong Kok, Hong Kong	Singapore	2–1	-1		Friendly
32	14 October 2014	Hong Kong Stadium, So Kon Po, Hong Kong	Argentina	0–7	-7		Friendly
33	13 November 2014	Taipei Municipal Stadium, Taipei, Taiwan	North Korea	1–2	-2	(c)	2015 EAFF East Asian Cup preliminary round 2
34	16 November 2014	Taipei Municipal Stadium, Taipei, Taiwan	Chinese Taipei	1–0	0	(c)	2015 EAFF East Asian Cup preliminary round 2
35	19 November 2014	Taipei Municipal Stadium, Taipei, Taiwan	Guam	0–0	0	(c)	2015 EAFF East Asian Cup preliminary round 2
36	28 March 2015	Mong Kok Stadium, Mong Kok, Hong Kong	Guam	1–0	0		Friendly
37	6 June 2015	Bukit Jalil National Stadium, Kuala Lumpur, Malaysia	Malaysia	0–0	0	(c)	Friendly
38	11 June 2015	Mong Kok Stadium, Mong Kok, Hong Kong	Bhutan	7–0	0	(c)	2018 FIFA World Cup qualification
39	16 June 2015	Mong Kok Stadium, Mong Kok, Hong Kong	Maldives	2–0	0	(c)	2018 FIFA World Cup qualification
40	4 September 2015	Bao'an Stadium, Shenzhen, China	China	0–0	0		2018 FIFA World Cup qualification
41	8 September 2015	Mong Kok Stadium, Mong Kok, Hong Kong	Qatar	2–3	-3	(c)	2018 FIFA World Cup qualification
42	8 October 2015	Rajamangala Stadium, Bangkok, Thailand	Thailand	0–1	-1	(c)	Friendly
43	13 October 2015	Changlimithang Stadium, Thimphu, Bhutan	Bhutan	1–0	0	(c)	2018 FIFA World Cup qualification
44	7 November 2015	Mong Kok Stadium, Mong Kok, Hong Kong	Myanmar	5–0	0	(c)	Friendly
45	12 November 2015	National Football Stadium, Male, Maldives	Maldives	1–0	0	(c)	2018 FIFA World Cup qualification
46	17 November 2015	Mong Kok Stadium, Mong Kok, Hong Kong	China	0–0	0	(c)	2018 FIFA World Cup qualification
47	24 March 2016	Jassim Bin Hamad Stadium, Doha, Qatar	Qatar	0–2	-2	(c)	2018 FIFA World Cup qualification
48	3 June 2016	Thuwunna Stadium, Yangon, Myanmar	Vietnam	2–2	0		2016 AYA Bank Cup
49	1 September 2016	Mong Kok Stadium, Mong Kok, Hong Kong	Cambodia	4–2	-2	(c)	Friendly
50	6 October 2016	Olympic Stadium, Phnom Penh, Cambodia	Cambodia	2–0	0	(c)	Friendly
51	11 October 2016	Mong Kok Stadium, Mong Kok, Hong Kong	Singapore	2–0	0	(c)	Friendly
52	6 November 2016	Mong Kok Stadium, Mong Kok, Hong Kong	Guam	3–2	-2	(c)	EAFF E-1 Football Championship 2017 Round 2
53	9 November 2016	Mong Kok Stadium, Mong Kok, Hong Kong	Chinese Taipei	4–2	-2	(c)	EAFF E-1 Football Championship 2017 Round 2
54	12 November 2016	Mong Kok Stadium, Mong Kok, Hong Kong	North Korea	0–1	-1	(c)	EAFF E-1 Football Championship 2017 Round 2
55	28 March 2017	Camille Chamoun Sports City Stadium, Beirut, Lebanon	Lebanon	0–2	-2	(c)	2019 AFC Asian Cup qualification
56	7 June 2017	Mong Kok Stadium, Mong Kok, Hong Kong	Jordan	0–0	0	(c)	Friendly
57	13 June 2017	Hong Kong Stadium, So Kon Po, Hong Kong	North Korea	1–1	-1	(c)	2019 AFC Asian Cup qualification
58	5 September 2017	Hang Jebat Stadium, Malacca City, Malaysia	Malaysia	1–1	-1	(c)	2019 AFC Asian Cup qualification
59	5 October 2017	Mong Kok Stadium, Mong Kok, Hong Kong	Laos	4–0	0	(c)	Friendly
60	10 October 2017	Hong Kong Stadium, So Kon Po, Hong Kong	Malaysia	2–0	0	(c)	2019 AFC Asian Cup qualification
61	9 November 2017	Mong Kok Stadium, Mong Kok, Hong Kong	Bahrain	0–2	-2	(c)	Friendly
62	14 November 2017	Hong Kong Stadium, So Kon Po, Hong Kong	Lebanon	0–1	-1	(c)	2019 AFC Asian Cup qualification
63	27 March 2018	Kim Il-sung Stadium, Pyongyang, North Korea	North Korea	0–2	-2	(c)	2019 AFC Asian Cup qualification
64	11 October 2018	Mong Kok Stadium, Mong Kok, Hong Kong	Thailand	0–1	-1	(c)	Friendly
65	16 October 2018	Wibawa Mukti Stadium, Cikarang, Indonesia	Indonesia	1–1	-1	(c)	Friendly
66	11 November 2018	Taipei Municipal Stadium, Taipei, Taiwan	Chinese Taipei	2–1	-1		2019 EAFF E-1 Football Championship Round 2
67	13 November 2018	Taipei Municipal Stadium, Taipei, Taiwan	North Korea	0–0	0		2019 EAFF E-1 Football Championship Round 2
68	16 November 2018	Taipei Municipal Stadium, Taipei, Taiwan	Mongolia	1–5	-1		2019 EAFF E-1 Football Championship Round 2
69	11 June 2019	Mong Kok Stadium, Mong Kok, Hong Kong	Chinese Taipei	0–2	-2		Friendly
70	5 September 2019	Phnom Penh Olympic Stadium, Phnom Penh, Cambodia	Cambodia	1–1	-1		2022 FIFA World Cup qualification
71	10 September 2019	Hong Kong Stadium, So Kon Po, Hong Kong	Iran	0–2	-2		2022 FIFA World Cup qualification
72	10 October 2019	Basra International Stadium, Basra, Iraq	Iraq	0–2	-2		2022 FIFA World Cup qualification
73	14 November 2019	Hong Kong Stadium, So Kon Po, Hong Kong	Bahrain	0–0	0		2022 FIFA World Cup qualification
74	19 November 2019	Hong Kong Stadium, So Kon Po, Hong Kong	Cambodia	2–0	0		2022 FIFA World Cup qualification
75	11 December 2019	Busan Asiad Main Stadium, Busan, South Korea	South Korea	0–2	-2		2019 EAFF E-1 Football Championship
76	19 December 2019	Busan Asiad Main Stadium, Busan, South Korea	China	0–2	-2		2019 EAFF E-1 Football Championship
77	3 June 2021	Al Muharraq Stadium, Arad, Bahrain	Iran	1–3	-3		2022 FIFA World Cup qualification
78	11 June 2021	Al Muharraq Stadium, Arad, Bahrain	Iraq	0–1	-1		2022 FIFA World Cup qualification
79	15 June 2021	Al Muharraq Stadium, Arad, Bahrain	Bahrain	0–4	-4		2022 FIFA World Cup qualification
80	11 June 2022	Salt Lake Stadium, Kolkata, India	Cambodia	3–0	0		2023 AFC Asian Cup qualification
81	14 June 2022	Salt Lake Stadium, Kolkata, India	India	0–4	-4		2023 AFC Asian Cup qualification
82	24 September 2022	Hong Kong Stadium, So Kon Po, Hong Kong	Myanmar	0–0	0	(c)	Friendly
83	28 March 2023	Sultan Ibrahim Stadium, Johor, Malaysia	Malaysia	0–2	-2	(c)	Friendly
84	15 June 2023	Lạch Tray Stadium, Hai Phong, Vietnam	Vietnam	0–1	0		Friendly
85	19 June 2023	Hong Kong Stadium, So Kon Po, Hong Kong	Thailand	0–1	-1		Friendly
86	7 September 2023	National Olympic Stadium, Phnom Penh, Cambodia	Cambodia	1–1	-1	(c)	Friendly
87	12 October 2023	Hong Kong Stadium, So Kon Po, Hong Kong	Bhutan	4–0	0	(c)	2026 FIFA World Cup qualification
88	21 November 2023	Hong Kong Stadium, So Kon Po, Hong Kong	Turkmenistan	2–2	-2	(c)	2026 FIFA World Cup qualification
89	14 January 2024	Khalifa International Stadium, Al Rayyan, Qatar	United Arab Emirates	1–3	-3	(c)	2023 AFC Asian Cup
90	19 January 2024	Khalifa International Stadium, Al Rayyan, Qatar	Iran	0–1	-1	(c)	2023 AFC Asian Cup
91	21 March 2024	Mong Kok Stadium, Mong Kok, Hong Kong	Uzbekistan	0–2	-2	(c)	2026 FIFA World Cup qualification – AFC second round
92	26 March 2024	Milliy Stadium, Tashkent, Uzbekistan	Uzbekistan	0–3	-3	(c)	2026 FIFA World Cup qualification – AFC second round
93	6 June 2024	Hong Kong Stadium, So Kon Po, Hong Kong	Iran	2–4	-4	(c)	2026 FIFA World Cup qualification – AFC second round
94	11 June 2024	Ashgabat Stadium, Ashgabat, Turkmenistan	Turkmenistan	0–0	0	(c)	2026 FIFA World Cup qualification – AFC second round
95	8 September 2024	Churchill Park, Lautoka, Fiji	Fiji	1–1	-1	(c)	Friendly
96	10 October 2024	Rheinpark Stadion, Vaduz, Liechtenstein	Liechtenstein	0–1	-1	(c)	Friendly
97	15 October 2024	Hong Kong Stadium, So Kon Po, Hong Kong	Cambodia	3–0	0	(c)	Friendly
98	14 November 2024	Hong Kong Stadium, So Kon Po, Hong Kong	Philippines	3–1	-1	(c)	Friendly
99	19 November 2024	Mong Kok Stadium, Mong Kok, Hong Kong	Mauritius	1–0	0	(c)	Friendly
100	8 December 2024	Mong Kok Stadium, Mong Kok, Hong Kong	Mongolia	3–0	0	(c)	2025 EAFF E-1 Preliminary
101	14 December 2024	Mong Kok Stadium, Mong Kok, Hong Kong	Chinese Taipei	2–1	-1	(c)	2025 EAFF E-1 Preliminary
102	17 December 2024	Hong Kong Stadium, So Kon Po, Hong Kong	Guam	5–0	0	(c)	2025 EAFF E-1 Preliminary
103	19 March 2025	Mong Kok Stadium, Mong Kok, Hong Kong	Macau	2–0	0	(c)	Friendly
104	25 March 2025	National Stadium, Kallang, Singapore	Singapore	0–0	0	(c)	2027 AFC Asian Cup qualification
105	5 June 2025	Hong Kong Stadium, So Kon Po, Hong Kong	Nepal	0–0	0	(c)	Friendly
106	10 June 2025	Kai Tak Stadium, Kai Tak, Hong Kong	India	0–0	0	(c)	2027 AFC Asian Cup qualification
107	8 July 2025	Yongin Mireu Stadium, Yongin, South Korea	Japan	1–6	-6	(c)	2025 EAFF E-1 Football Championship
108	11 July 2025	Yongin Mireu Stadium, Yongin, South Korea	South Korea	0–2	-2	(c)	2025 EAFF E-1 Football Championship
109	15 July 2025	Yongin Mireu Stadium, Yongin, South Korea	China	0–1	-1	(c)	2025 EAFF E-1 Football Championship
110	4 September 2025	Kanchanaburi Province Stadium, Kanchanaburi, Thailand	Iraq	1–2	-2	(c)	2025 King's Cup
111	7 September 2025	Kanchanaburi Province Stadium, Kanchanaburi, Thailand	Fiji	8–0	0	(c)	2025 King's Cup
112	9 October 2025	National Stadium, Dhaka, Bangladesh	Bangladesh	4–3	-2	(c)	2027 AFC Asian Cup qualification
Total					-148	60	

== Honours ==
South China

- Hong Kong First Division: 2012–13
- Hong Kong FA Cup: 2010–11
- Hong Kong League Cup: 2010–11

Pegasus

- Hong Kong FA Cup: 2009–10

Eastern

- Hong Kong Premier League: 2015–16
- Hong Kong FA Cup: 2019–20, 2023–24, 2024–25
- Hong Kong Senior Shield: 2019–20, 2024–25
- Hong Kong Sapling Cup: 2020–21

Hong Kong U23

- East Asian Games: 2009: Gold Medal

Individual

- Hong Kong Best Youth Player: 2010, 2013
- Hong Kong Premier League Team of the Year: 2009–10, 2010–11, 2011–12, 2012–13, 2013–14, 2014–15, 2015–16, 2016–17, 2020–21, 2021–22
- Hong Kong Footballer of the Year: 2016

== See also ==
- List of men's footballers with 100 or more international caps

Sporting positions
Preceded by Chan Wai Ho	Hong Kong national under-23 football team captain 2011	Succeeded by Tam Lok Hin
Preceded by Chan Wai Ho	Hong Kong national football team captain 2016–2018	Succeeded by Huang Yang
Preceded by Huang Yang	Hong Kong national football team captain 2023–	Succeeded by
