= Tse Ka Wing =

Hong Kong footballer (born 1999)

Tse Ka Wing 謝家榮
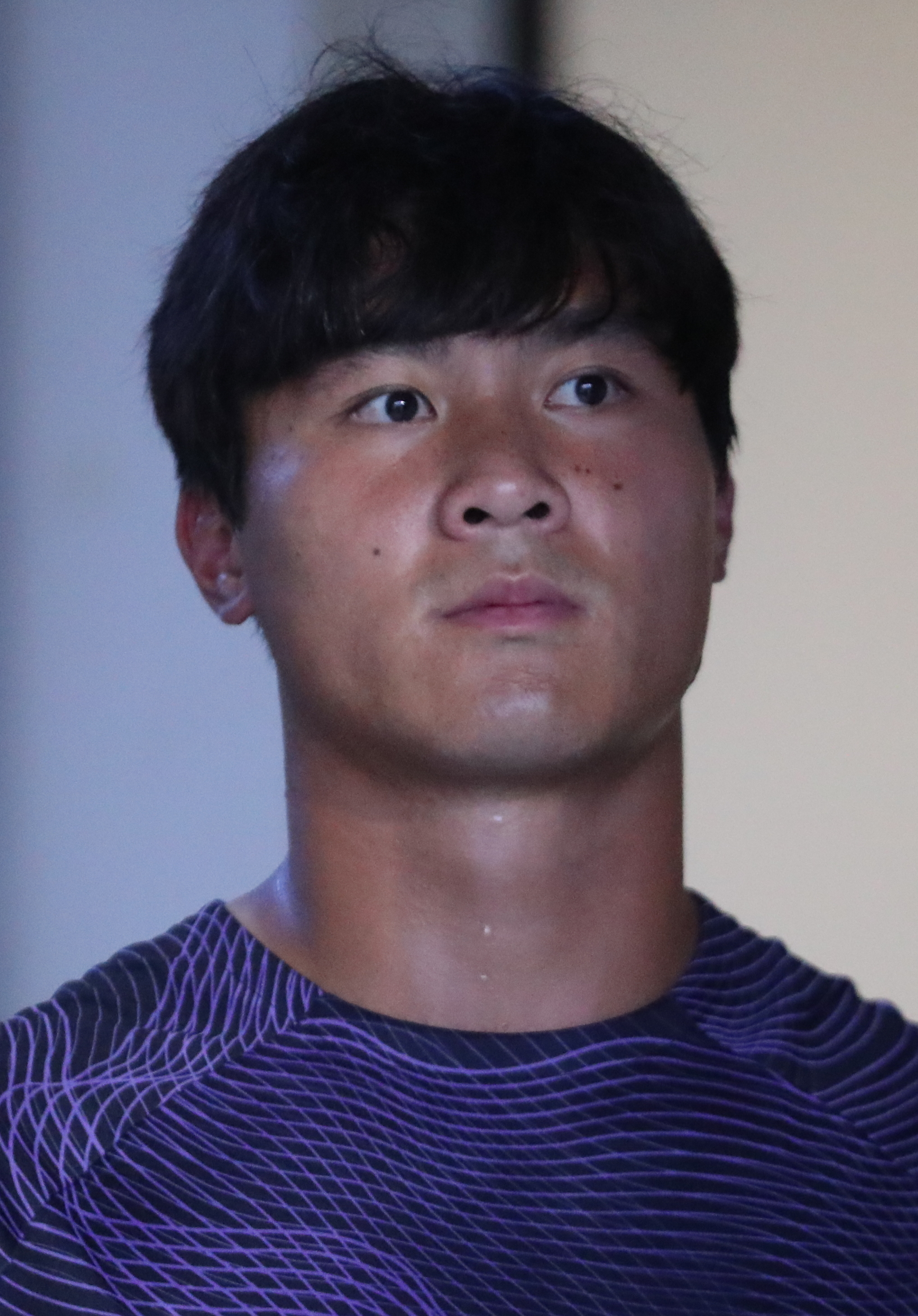
- Tse with Hong Kong in 2023

Personal information
- Full name: Tse Ka Wing
- Date of birth: 4 September 1999 (age 27)
- Place of birth: Hong Kong
- Height: 1.89 m (6 ft 2 in)
- Position: Goalkeeper

Team information
- Current team: Tai Po
- Number: 94

Youth career
- 2012–2016: CFCSSHK
- 2016–2017: Bury

Senior career*
Years	Team	Apps	(Gls)
2017	Rangers (HKG)	1	(0)
2017–2019	Dreams FC	21	(0)
2019–2020	R&F	3	(0)
2021	Happy Valley	3	(0)
2021–2022	HK U23	0	(0)
2022–	Tai Po	67	(0)

International career^{‡}
2014	Hong Kong U-16	3	(0)
2015–2017	Hong Kong U-19	5	(0)
2021	Hong Kong U-22	2	(0)
2023–	Hong Kong	11	(0)
Medal record
Men's football
Representing Hong Kong
FIFA ASEAN Challenge Cup
Winner	2026 Hong Kong
- * Club domestic league appearances and goals as of 21 November 2026 ‡ National team caps and goals as of 30 September 2026

Tse Ka Wing (Chinese: 謝家榮, Jyutping: ze^{6} gaa^{1} wing^{4}; born 4 September 1999) is a Hong Kong professional footballer who currently plays as a goalkeeper for Hong Kong Premier League club Tai Po and the Hong Kong national team.

== Youth career ==
Tse was born in Hong Kong and at an early age, played football streets with his father. In 2012, he joined Chelsea Soccer School where he trained under the tutelage of Shum Kwok Pui and participated in various tournaments in Spain and the Mediterranean, eventually earning him a call up to the Hong Kong's U-16 team. At a regional youth tournament organized by Manchester United, Tse's performances attracted the attention of Shandong Luneng's chairman who offered him the opportunity to join the club. He later declined the offer.

In March 2016, Tse and his Chelsea School teammate Jordan Lam went on trial at Leicester City. They later went on trial at Bury where they both join the Shakers's academy for the 2016–17 season. However, neither player were granted work permits to play in England and thus both players left Bury at the end of 2016 without ever appearing in a youth match.

== Club career ==
=== Rangers ===
On 27 January 2017, Tse signed his first professional contract with Rangers. He made his debut as a substitute on 6 May 2017, coming off the bench in the 83rd minute in a game against R&F.

=== Dreams FC ===
On 10 June 2017, Tse left Rangers to sign with Dreams FC.

=== R&F ===
On 19 June 2019, R&F head coach Yeung Ching Kwong revealed that Tse would join the club. He was officially announced as an R&F player on 9 July 2019. On 14 October 2020, Tse left the club after his club's withdrawal from the HKPL in the new season.

=== Happy Valley ===
On 6 February 2021, Tse signed with Happy Valley.

=== HK U23 ===
In September 2021, Tse signed with HK U23.

=== Tai Po ===
On 8 August 2022, Tse joined Tai Po. 24/25 season, Tse helped Tai Po win the Hong Kong Premier League title.

== International career ==
In October 2014, Tse earned a call up to the Hong Kong U-16's for the 2014 AFC U-16 Championship.

On 15 June 2023, Tse made his international debut for Hong Kong in a friendly match against Vietnam.

Tse earned his second cap in a 10–0 victory against Brunei keeping a clean sheet in the process.

On 26 December 2023, Tse was named in Hong Kong's squad for the 2023 AFC Asian Cup.

On 30 May 2025, Tse represent Hong Kong in a friendly match against Manchester United.

== Honours ==
Club

Tai Po

- Hong Kong Premier League: 2024–25
- Hong Kong FA Cup: 2025–26
- Hong Kong Senior Shield: 2025–26

International

Hong Kong

- FIFA ASEAN Challenge Cup: 2026

Individual

- Hong Kong Premier League Team of the Year: 2023–24

== Career statistics ==
=== International ===
As of 14 October 2025

National team	Year	Apps	Goals
Hong Kong	2023	4	0
Hong Kong	2024	3	0
Hong Kong	2025	3	0
Hong Kong	2026	4	0
Total		11	0

#	Date	Venue	Opponent	Result	Competition
1	15 June 2023	Lạch Tray Stadium, Hai Phong, Hong Kong	Vietnam	0–1	Friendly
2	11 September 2023	Hong Kong Stadium, So Kon Po, Hong Kong	Brunei	10–0	Friendly
3	17 October 2023	Changlimithang Stadium, Thimphu, Bhutan	Bhutan	0–2	2026 FIFA World Cup qualification – AFC first round
4	16 November 2023	Azadi Stadium, Tehran, Iran	Iran	0–4	2026 FIFA World Cup qualification – AFC second round
5	1 January 2024	Baniyas Stadium, Abu Dhabi, United Arab Emirates	China	2–1	Friendly
6	23 January 2024	Abdullah bin Khalifa Stadium, Doha, Qatar	Palestine	0–3	2023 AFC Asian Cup
