= Li Yim Lam =

Hong Kong footballer

Personal information
- Full name: Li Yim Lam
- Date of birth: October 1, 1993 (age 33)
- Place of birth: Hong Kong
- Height: 1.77 m (5 ft 10 in)
- Position: Centre forward

Youth career
- 2010–2011: South China

Senior career*
Years	Team	Apps	(Gls)
2011–2012	South China	0	(0)
2011–2012	→ Hong Kong Sapling (loan)	1	(0)
2012–2013	Telecom	3	(1)
2024–2025	Fu Moon	4	(1)
2024–	Sun Hei		
- * Club domestic league appearances and goals as of 17 May 2026

Li Yim Lam (Chinese: 李炎林; Jyutping: lei^{5} jim^{4} lam^{4} ; born 1 October 1993) is a former Hong Kong footballer who played as a centre forward.

== Club career ==
=== South China ===
In July 2011, Li Yim Lam was promoted from the reserve to the first team. He will wear number 19 in the season 2011/2012.

In August 2011, he was being loaned to a new form club Hong Kong Sapling.

=== Hong Kong Sapling ===
Unlike the other two South China loanee, Cheung Chun Hei and Kot Cho Wai, Li Yim Lam only got a few chances in his loan spell in Hong Kong Sapling. He made his debut for Hong Kong Sapling against Sunray Cave JC Sun Hei as a 66th-minute substitute for Li Ngai Hoi. This is his only league appearance in the season. He also featured one league cup match against Sham Shui Po as a half-time substitute for Tsang Kin Fong.

== Career statistics ==
As of 28 September 2012

Club Performance			League		Cup				League Cup		Continental		Total	
Season	Club	League	Apps	Goals	Apps	Goals	Apps	Goals	Apps	Goals	Apps	Goals	Apps	Goals
Hong Kong			League		Senior Shield		League Cup		FA Cup		AFC Cup		Total	
2011–12	South China	First Division	0	0	0	0	0	0	0	0	N/A	N/A	0	0
2011–12	Hong Kong Sapling (loan)	First Division	1	0	0	0	1	0	0	0	N/A	N/A	2	0
South China Total			0	0	0	0	0	0	0	0	0	0	0	0
Hong Kong Sapling Total			1	0	0	0	1	0	0	0	0	0	2	0
Hong Kong			League		Junior Shield		League Cup		FA Cup		AFC Cup		Total	
2011–12	Telecom	Third Division	3	1	0	0	N/A	N/A	N/A	N/A	N/A	N/A	3	1
Telecom Total			3	1	0	0	0	0	0	0	0	0	3	1
Hong Kong Total			4	1	0	0	1	0	0	0	N/A	N/A	5	1
Career Total			4	1	0	0	1	0	0	0	N/A	N/A	5	1
