= Paris Nakajima-Farran =

Japanese-born Canadian soccer player (born 1989)

Personal information
- Full name: Paris Yui Nakajima-Farran
- Date of birth: 11 August 1989 (age 37)
- Place of birth: Tokyo, Japan
- Height: 1.75 m (5 ft 9 in)
- Positions: Left-back; winger

Youth career
- 2004–2007: Yokohama F. Marinos

Senior career*
Years	Team	Apps	(Gls)
2007	Yokohama F. Marinos	0	(0)
2007–2009	Næstved	18	(0)
2009–2010	Horsens	1	(0)
2011–2012	South China	4	(0)
2012	Europa		
2013	Dezzolla Shimane	4	
2014	Tokyo 23 FC		

International career
2007–2009	Canada U20	11	(0)
2008	Canada	1	(0)
- * Club domestic league appearances and goals

Paris Yui Nakajima-Farran (中島 勇生, Nakajima Yūi; born 11 August 1989) is a professional soccer player who played as a left-back or winger. Born in Japan, he played for the Canada national team.

== Personal life ==
Nakajima-Farran was born in Tokyo to an English–Zimbabwean father and Japanese mother. At the age of four, he moved to England with his family, and returned to Japan ten years later to play football with the youth team of the J-League club Yokohama F. Marinos. His brother Issey is also a former professional footballer. He has Canadian and British citizenship, and is a graduate of Yokohama International School, where he played alongside Mike Havenaar.

== Club career ==
Nakajima-Farran played for the Yokohama F. Marinos youth team from 2004 until 2007. He went professional in 2007 at the age of 17, after signing a two-year contract with Danish 1st Division team Næstved Boldklub. In September 2009, Nakajima-Farran joined his brother at AC Horsens on a one-year deal. In July 2011, he signed with Hong Kong First Division League club South China AA, but was released by the club on 7 January 2012. Later that year he joined Spanish third division side CE Europa, and played mostly for the second team. Nakajima-Farran also had a stint with Japanese fifth Division outfit, Dezzolla Shimane, before joining Tokyo 23 FC which plays in the Kantō Soccer League.

== International career ==
In January 2008, Nakajima-Farran got his first international call in up for the winter training camp held in Florida for the Canada national team. He also trained with the Canada U-23 Olympic team in March 2008. He earned his first cap for Canada U-20 in an exhibition match against Argentina in May 2008, starting at right back. He has also represented the Canada U-20 side during the 2009 edition of the Francophone Games hosted by Lebanon.
