= 2011 Long Teng Cup =

2011 Dragon Cup

Tournament details
- Host country: Taiwan
- Dates: 30 September – 4 October
- Teams: 4 (from 1 confederation)
- Venue(s): 1 (in 1 host city)

Final positions
- Champions: Hong Kong (2nd title)
- Runners-up: Philippines
- Third place: Chinese Taipei
- Fourth place: Macau

Tournament statistics
- Matches played: 6
- Goals scored: 23 (3.83 per match)
- Top scorer(s): (Philippines) Emelio Caligdong (4 goals)
- Best player(s): (Hong Kong) Chan Siu Ki

The 2011 Long Teng Cup (Chinese: 龍騰盃國際邀請賽) was the 2nd staging of the Long Teng Cup, an international football competition held in Kaohsiung, Taiwan. The tournament took place from 30 September to 4 October 2011.

== Competing teams ==
The 2011 staging of the competition featured the same national teams that competed in the inaugural edition in 2010. Hong Kong defended their title with their senior national team. The team representing the Philippines included players from their under-23 national team, which will be competing at the 2011 Southeast Asian Games. For Macau, their squad was a student based team which was the make up of their squad in last year's edition.

The following four national teams, shown with pre-tournament FIFA Rankings, participated in the tournament.

- Hong Kong (155)
- Philippines (165)
- Chinese Taipei (172)
- Macau (191)

== Venue ==
All matches were played at the Kaohsiung National Stadium, a multi-purpose stadium located in Kaohsiung that is currently the largest stadium in the area in terms of capacity.

Kaohsiung	2011 Long Teng Cup (Taiwan)
Kaohsiung National Stadium	2011 Long Teng Cup (Taiwan)
22°42′10″N 120°17′42″E	2011 Long Teng Cup (Taiwan)
Capacity: 55,000 (with expansion seats)	2011 Long Teng Cup (Taiwan)

== Matches ==
All times are National Standard Time – UTC+8.

=== Round-robin tournament ===
Key to colours in round-robin
Team that won the tournament

Team	Pld	W	D	L	GF	GA	GD	Pts
Hong Kong	3	2	1	0	14	4	+10	7
Philippines	3	1	2	0	5	3	+2	5
Chinese Taipei	3	1	1	1	3	6	−3	4
Macau	3	0	0	3	1	10	−9	0

30 September 2011
16:30

Hong Kong	3–3	Philippines
Lee Wai Lim 2'; Cheng Lai Hin 22'; Au Yeung Yiu Chung 86'	Report	P. Younghusband 31' (pen.); Caligdong 44', 61'

Kaohsiung National Stadium, Kaohsiung
30 September 2011
19:00

Chinese Taipei	3–0	Macau
Chiu I-huan 11'; Chen Po-liang 31'; Wu Chun-ching 45+2'	Report

Kaohsiung National Stadium, Kaohsiung

2 October 2011
16:30

Hong Kong	5–1	Macau
Sham Kwok Keung 19', 75'; Chan Siu Ki 42'; Wong Chin Hung 50', 81' (pen.)	Report	Leong Ka Hang 14'

Kaohsiung National Stadium, Kaohsiung
2 October 2011
19:00

Chinese Taipei	0–0	Philippines
	Report

Kaohsiung National Stadium, Kaohsiung

4 October 2011
16:30

Philippines	2–0	Macau
Caligdong 58', 87'	Report

Kaohsiung National Stadium, Kaohsiung
4 October 2011
19:00

Chinese Taipei	0–6	Hong Kong
	Report	Chan Siu Ki 14'; Kwok Kin Pong 25'; Chan Wai Ho 40'; Lee Hong Lim 42', 68'; Lo Kwan Yee 76'

Kaohsiung National Stadium, Kaohsiung

== Awards ==
2011 Long Teng Cup champion

Hong Kong
Second title

== Goalscorers ==
4 goals

- (Philippines) Emelio Caligdong

2 goals

- (Hong Kong) Chan Siu Ki
- (Hong Kong) Lee Hong Lim
- (Hong Kong) Sham Kwok Keung
- (Hong Kong) Wong Chin Hung

1 goal

- (Chinese Taipei) Chen Po-liang
- (Chinese Taipei) Wu Chun-ching
- (Chinese Taipei) Chiu I-huan
- (Hong Kong) Au Yeung Yiu Chung
- (Hong Kong) Chan Wai Ho
- (Hong Kong) Cheng Lai Hin
- (Hong Kong) Kwok Kin Pong
- (Hong Kong) Lee Wai Lim
- (Hong Kong) Lo Kwan Yee
- (Macau) Leong Ka Hang
- (Philippines) Phil Younghusband

== See also ==
- List of sporting events in Taiwan
