= Wong Chin Hung =

Hong Kong footballer (born 1982)

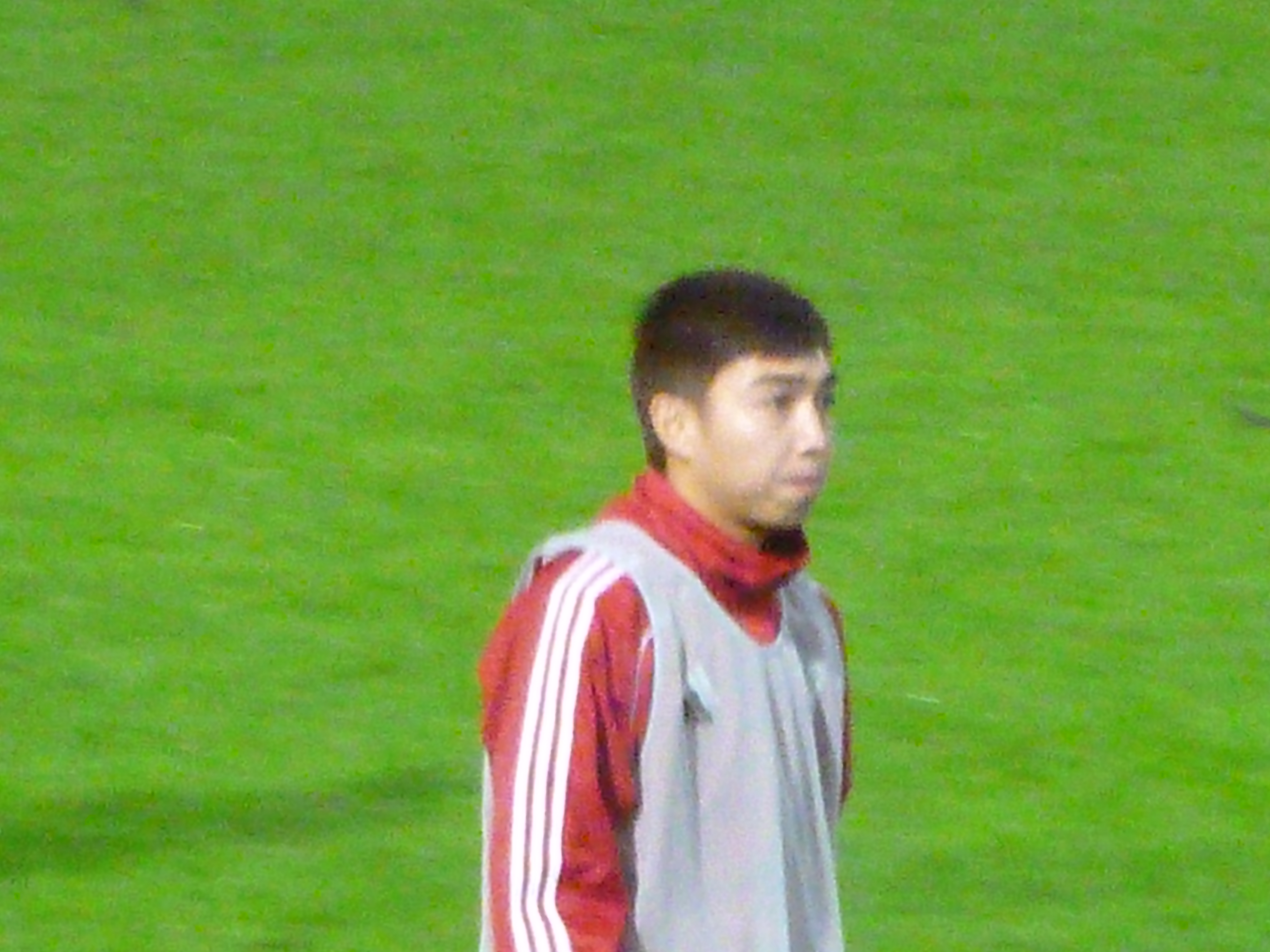

Personal information
- Full name: Wong Chin Hung
- Date of birth: 2 March 1982 (age 44)
- Place of birth: Hong Kong
- Height: 1.71 m (5 ft 7 in)
- Position: Left back

Team information
- Current team: Rangers (HKG) (assistant coach)

Senior career*
Years	Team	Apps	(Gls)
2001–2002	Instant-Dict		
2002–2003	Rangers (HKG)	2	(0)
2003–2005	Fukien	25	(2)
2005–2007	Rangers (HKG)	26	(2)
2007–2013	South China	57	(2)
2008	→ Pegasus (loan)	9	(4)
2013	Rangers (HKG)	8	(0)
2013–2017	Eastern	24	(0)
2017–2018	Eastern District	4	(1)
2018–2020	Rangers (HKG)	27	(5)

International career^{‡}
2008–2011	Hong Kong	13	(3)

Managerial career
- 2017–2018: Eastern (assistant coach)
- 2018–2023: Rangers (HKG)
- 2023–2024: Rangers (HKG) (assistant coach)
- 2024–2025: Rangers (HKG)
- 2025–: Rangers (HKG) (assistant coach)
Medal record
Representing Hong Kong
East Asian Games
Gold medal – first place	2009 Hong Kong	Football
- * Club domestic league appearances and goals as of 26 October 2020 ‡ National team caps and goals as of 5 October 2011

Wong Chin Hung (Chinese: 黃展鴻; Jyutping: wong^{4} zin^{2} hung^{4}; born 2 March 1982) is a Hong Kong football coach and a former professional footballer who played as a left back. He is currently the assistant coach of Hong Kong Premier League club Rangers.

== Club career ==
=== Instant-Dict ===
Wong played on hard grounds at lunchtime when he was a teenager. He enjoys having the ball at this feet. At 16, he accompanied a school friend to a trial at Instant-Dict FC's youth team. His father then received a call from the club wanting to recruit him.

=== Rangers ===
Wong only received a monthly salary of HK$1,500 at Rangers. He had to work in renovation to make ends meet and did not play for two months. But Philip Lee of Rangers asked him to come back to football. He was selected to play in the indoor 5-a-side Hong Kong team and regained his love for football.

=== Pegasus ===
Wong was loaned to Pegasus by South China for the 2008–09 season. On 12 October 2008, Wong scored a hat-trick as a left back in the 8–0 win against Tuen Mun Progoal.

=== South China ===
In the 2010 AFC Cup, Wong came on as a substitute and scored the winner against Muangthong United in the final minute in an ill-tempered match which saw both sides reduced to 10 men. The win meant South China and Muangthong both have 10 points from five games. But the Hong Kong side had a better head-to-head record following their 0–0 draw in Hong Kong.

=== Rangers ===
On 11 January 2013, Wong returned to his former club Rangers from South China as a free transfer. On the same day, Rangers' defender Chak Ting Fung was transferred to South China. The two deals were regarded as a player exchange.

Wong was also appointed as the team captain right after he joined Rangers.

=== Eastern ===
Wong refused to extend the contract with Rangers and made a transfer list request after the end of the 2012–13 season. On 1 June 2013, Wong joined newly-promoted First Division club Eastern Salon for free.

Wong retired prior to the 2017–18 season to become an assistant coach at Eastern.

== International career ==
=== Hong Kong U-23 ===
At the 2009 East Asian Games, Wong was selected into the Hong Kong U23 as an over-age player after Chak Ting Fung was injured. He managed one goal and two assists through his corner kicks in the tournament. He also scored the last penalty in the penalty shoot-out in the final against Japan. (in Chinese)

=== Hong Kong ===
On 2 October 2011, Wong scored two goals for Hong Kong, one of them a re-taken penalty, in the 2011 Long Teng Cup game against Macau. Hong Kong won 5–1 in the end.

== Managerial career ==
In October 2024, Wong was once again appointed as the head coach of Rangers following the departure of Tim Bredbury.

== Personal life ==
Wong has had an uneasy relationship with his father, because he often injures himself and damages his footwear while playing football. His father once locked him up in their home to stop him from playing. He has also never attended any of his matches.

== Honour ==
=== Club ===
South China

- Hong Kong First Division: 2007–08, 2008–09, 2009–10
- Hong Kong Senior Shield: 2009–10
- Hong Kong FA Cup: 2010–11
- HKFA League Cup: 2007–08, 2010–11

Eastern

- Hong Kong First Division: 2015–16

Pegasus

- Hong Kong Senior Shield: 2008–09

=== Individual ===
- 2009 East Asian Games Football Event: Gold

== Career statistics ==
=== Club ===
As of 3 June 2011

Club	Season	League		Senior Shield		League Cup		FA Cup		AFC Cup		Total	
Club	Season	Apps	Goals	Apps	Goals	Apps	Goals	Apps	Goals	Apps	Goals	Apps	Goals
Rangers	2005–06	? (?)	?	? (?)	?	? (?)	?	? (?)	?	? (?)	?	? (?)	?
Rangers	2006–07	? (?)	?	? (?)	?	? (?)	?	? (?)	?	? (?)	?	? (?)	?
Rangers	All	? (?)	?	? (?)	?	? (?)	?	? (?)	?	? (?)	?	? (?)	?
South China	2007–08	18 (0)	1	2 (0)	0	5 (0)	0	2 (0)	0	4 (2)	0	31 (2)	1
South China	All	18 (0)	1	2 (0)	0	5 (0)	0	2 (0)	0	4 (2)	0	31 (2)	1
Pegasus	2008–09	9 (0)	4	4 (0)	0	N/A	N/A	N/A	N/A	N/A	N/A	13 (0)	4
Pegasus	All	9 (0)	4	4 (0)	0	N/A	N/A	N/A	N/A	N/A	N/A	13 (0)	4
South China	2008–09	7 (0)	1	0 (0)	0	1 (0)	0	2 (1)	0	2 (2)	1	12 (3)	2
South China	2009–10	1 (0)	0	0 (0)	0	0 (0)	0	0 (0)	0	1 (0)	0	2 (0)	0
South China	All	26 (0)	2	2 (0)	0	6 (0)	0	4 (1)	0	7 (4)	0	45 (5)	3

=== International ===
As of 5 October 2011

#	Date	Venue	Opponent	Result	Scored	Competition
1	19 November 2008	Macau UST Stadium, Macau	Macau	9–1	0	Friendly
2	23 August 2009	World Games Stadium, Kaohsiung, Taiwan	Chinese Taipei	4–0	0	2010 EAFF Championship Semi-finals
3	27 August 2009	World Games Stadium, Kaohsiung, Taiwan	Guam	12–0	1	2010 EAFF Championship Semi-finals
4	18 November 2009	Hong Kong Stadium, Hong Kong	Japan	0–4	0	2011 AFC Asian Cup qualification
5	11 February 2010	Olympic Stadium, Tokyo, Japan	Japan	0–3	0	2010 East Asian Football Championship
6	14 February 2010	Olympic Stadium, Tokyo, Japan	China	0–2	0	2010 East Asian Football Championship
7	3 March 2010	Hong Kong Stadium, Hong Kong	Yemen	0–0	0	2011 AFC Asian Cup qualification
8	9 February 2011	Shah Alam Stadium, Kuala Lumpur	Malaysia	0–2	0	Friendly
9	3 June 2011	Siu Sai Wan Sports Ground, Hong Kong	Malaysia	1–1	0	Friendly
10	28 July 2011	Siu Sai Wan Sports Ground, Hong Kong	Saudi Arabia	0–5	0	2014 FIFA World Cup qualification
11	30 September 2011	Kaohsiung National Stadium, Kaohsiung, Taiwan	Philippines	3–3	0	2011 Long Teng Cup
12	2 October 2011	Kaohsiung National Stadium, Kaohsiung, Taiwan	Macau	5–1	2	2011 Long Teng Cup
13	4 October 2011	Kaohsiung National Stadium, Kaohsiung, Taiwan	Chinese Taipei	6–0	0	2011 Long Teng Cup
