= Chan Wai Ho =

Hong Kong footballer (born 1982)

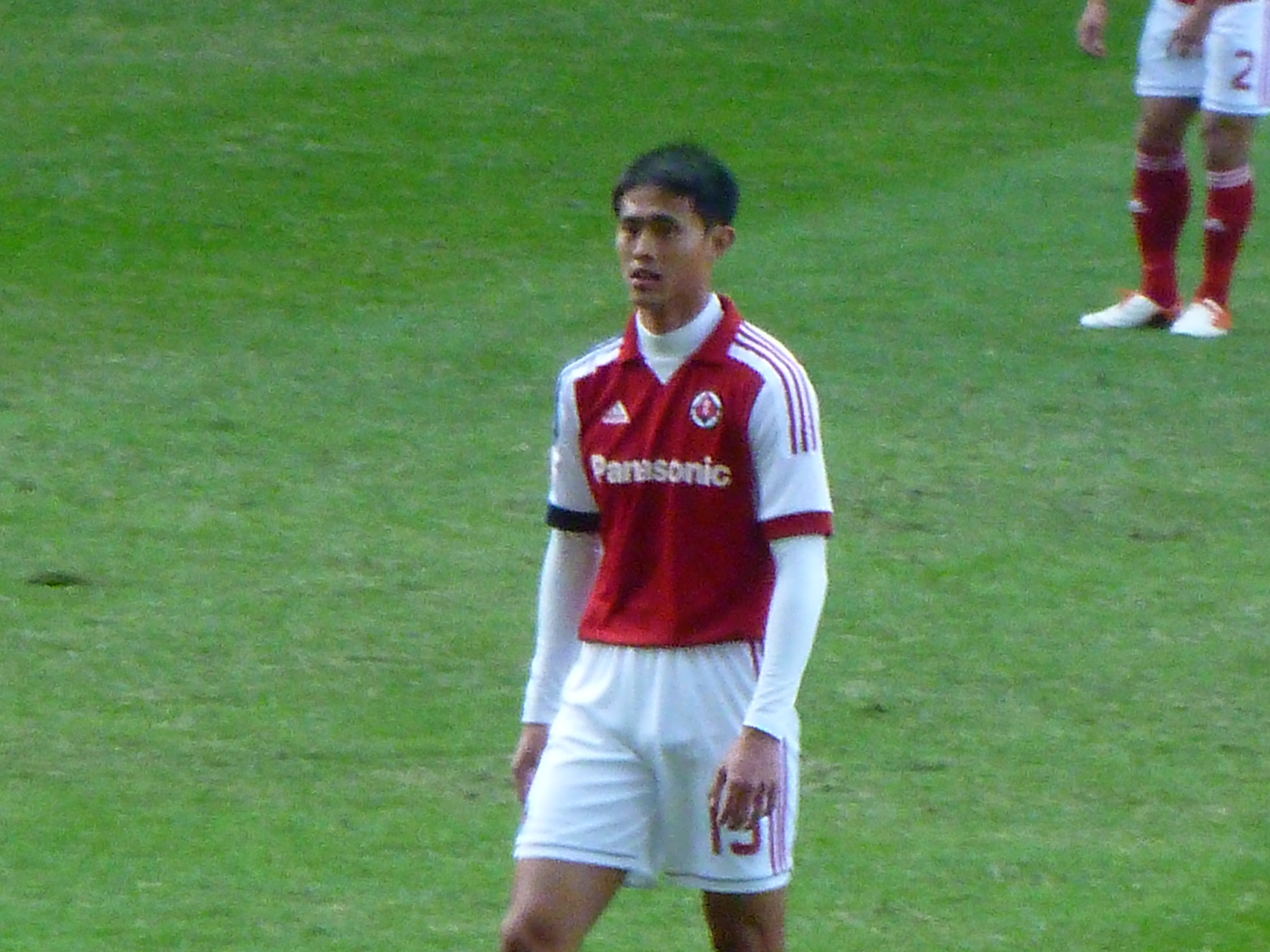
- Chan in 2011

Personal information
- Date of birth: 24 April 1982 (age 44)
- Place of birth: Kwun Tong, Hong Kong
- Height: 1.84 m (6 ft 0 in)
- Position: Centre-back

Youth career
- 1996–1998: Hong Kong Sports Institute
- 1998–1999: Rangers (HKG)

Senior career*
Years	Team	Apps	(Gls)
1999–2000	Yee Hope		
2000–2007	Rangers (HKG)	140	(9)
2007–2010	South China	57	(4)
2010	Fourway Rangers	9	(3)
2011–2017	South China	74	(4)
2017–2019	Dreams FC	26	(3)
2019–2020	Pegasus	5	(0)
2020–2024	Eastern District	22	(0)

International career
2000–2010	Hong Kong U-23	20	(3)
2000–2017	Hong Kong	65	(6)

Managerial career
- 2019–2020: Pegasus (assistant coach)
Medal record
Representing Hong Kong
East Asian Games
Gold medal – first place	2009 Hong Kong	Football
- * Club domestic league appearances and goals

Chan Wai Ho
- Traditional Chinese: 陳偉豪
- Simplified Chinese: 陈伟豪
Transcriptions
Standard Mandarin
- Hanyu Pinyin: Chén Wěiháo
- Wade–Giles: Ch'en Wei-hao
- Yale Romanization: Chén Wěiháu
- IPA: [ʈʂʰə̌n wèɪxǎʊ]
Yue: Cantonese
- Yale Romanization: Chàhn Wáihhòuh
- Jyutping: Can4 Wai5hou4
- IPA: [tsʰɐ̏n wɐ̬ihȍu]

Chan Wai Ho (Chinese: 陳偉豪; born 24 April 1982) is a former Hong Kong professional footballer who played as a centre-back.

Chan was a member of the East Asian Games gold medal-winning Hong Kong U-23 squad in 2009. He was also the captain of the Hong Kong senior team from 2010 to 2017. He is sometimes referred to as Tai Ho (Traditional Chinese: 大豪) as a nickname for him and to distinguish him from fellow former Hong Kong international, Lee Chi Ho.

== Early life ==
Chan lived in Lok Wah Estate, Ngau Tau Kok when he was young and he graduated from Maryknoll Vocational Evening Secondary School. He moved to the player hostel of Rangers in Boundary Street when he was a vocational apprenticeship of Rangers.

== Club career ==
=== Rangers and Yee Hope ===
His father decided that he would join Rangers to be a vocational apprentice when Chan was 16 years old. He stayed at Rangers for some months on trial for a professional contract. However, Rangers only gave him a contract after several twists and turns. Eventually, he appeared for the first team a few times in this season.

In the 1999–2000 season, Yee Hope chairman Joe Chan invited Chan to join his team. Chan started his professional career in this season. His number of appearances did not increase after he joined the team, but Arie van der Zouwen thought Chan was one of the best centre back in Hong Kong and selected him for Hong Kong.

In March 2004, Chan was suspended for 12 games after fighting along with four other Rangers players against Nan Shing Property FC players in a league match in Dongguan on 7 March 2004. The match was suspended and never completed.

In 2006, it was rumoured that Chan had had a trial with English Premiership Club Reading and would play at the Madejski Stadium in the English Premiership. In 2007, it was rumoured that he would join Birmingham City after Hong Kong businessman Carson Yeung became the chairman and executive director of the club.

==== Transfer record ====
Chan's transfer fee to South China from Rangers was HK$400,000, which broke the record of the highest local transfer fee and highest transfer fee in Hong Kong First Division. The highest local transfer fee record was kept by Tam Ah Fook when he moved to Ernest Borel from Happy Valley by HK$140,000 in 1992. The highest overall transfer fee was originally kept by Cheng Siu Chung when he moved from LD Alajuelense in Costa Rica to South China in the 1994–95 season for a fee of US$30,000 (about HK$234,000). But there was rumour in the media that the record has been broken by Chan Siu Ki's 2008 transfer from Kitchee to South China, which cost the Caroliners HK$800,000. The actual fee has not been disclosed.

=== South China ===
On 19 April 2007, it was revealed on the HKFA webpage that Chan transferred to South China from Rangers. His registration was just in time for him to represent the team to compete in the Hong Kong FA Cup 2006-07. Chan was described by South China convenor Steven Lo to be the best centre back in Hong Kong. He made his debut for South China on 20 April 2007 in the Hong Kong FA Cup First Round match against Tai Po.

Chan wore the number 15 in South China to commemorate his former Rangers teammate Cheung Yiu Lun, who died in a traffic accident in October 2003. He was not able to wear the number 15 at Rangers because the number was retired after Cheung's death.

=== Back to South China ===
Chan re-joined South China in the January 2011 transfer window. He had just completed coaching for the Fourway Rangers. He signed a one-and-a-half-year contract.

Chan scored the opening goal in the 2010-11 Hong Kong FA Cup final against Tai Po.

=== Dreams FC ===
Following South China's decision to self-relegate, Chan terminated his contract with the club. He was announced as a player and captain of the rebranded Dreams FC on 26 July 2017.

On 8 June 2018, Chan confirmed that he had renewed his contract for the following season.

On 26 May 2019, Chan accepted another renewal of his contract. However, as a result of Dreams FC's decision to self-relegate, Chan was left without work.

On 17 August 2019, he announced his decision to retire from professional football.

=== Pegasus ===
On 2 September 2019, Chan changed his mind and joined Pegasus to be a player and an assistant coach.

Due to the financial strain caused by the 2020 coronavirus pandemic, Pegasus asked its players to either accept a pay cut or agree to a mutual termination. On 7 April 2020, Chan announced that he would terminate his contract with immediate effect.

On 14 July 2020, Chan once again announced his decision to retire from professional football.

== International career ==
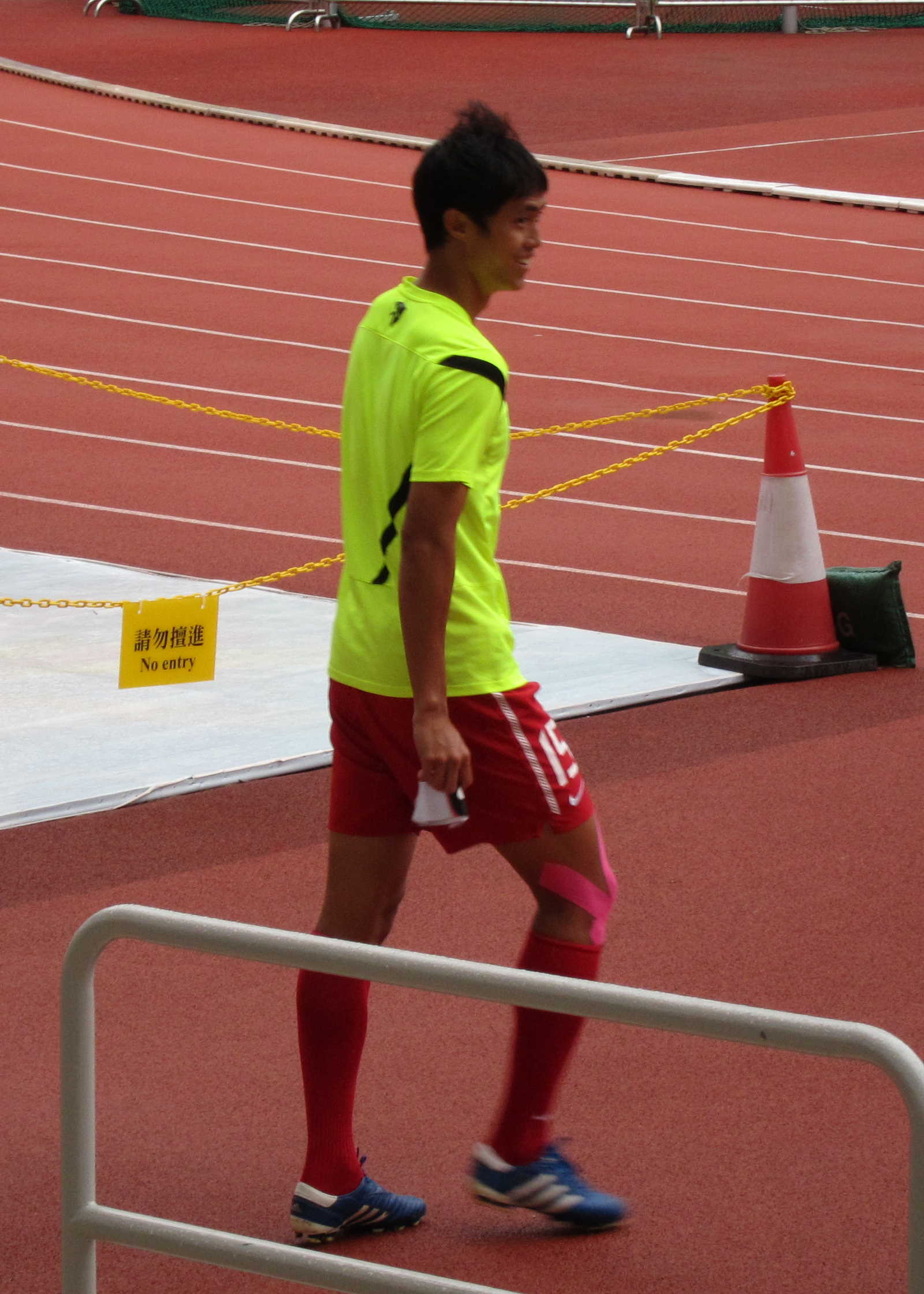
Chan playing for the Hong Kong national football team

=== Hong Kong ===
Arie van der Zouwen selected him for the Hong Kong national football team in 2000. On 12 November 2000, Chan made his international debut for Hong Kong in a friendly match against United Arab Emirates.

In June 2011, Chan was made captain of Hong Kong for the 2014 FIFA World Cup Asian qualifiers against Saudi Arabia.

On 22 March 2013, Chan scored the winner for Hong Kong against Vietnam in the 2015 AFC Asian Cup qualifiers.

Chan played his farewell match for the representative team on 7 June 2017 in a friendly match against Jordan.

Having 65 international caps in total, Chan is one of the most capped players in the Hong Kong national football team.

=== Hong Kong U23 ===
Chan scored twice in the 2009 East Asian Games, against South Korea in a group game and against North Korea in the semi-final. In the penalty shoot-out against North Korea, Chan also scored his penalty.

Chan scored the winning goal for Hong Kong U-23 against Uzbekistan U-23 in the 2010 Asian Games. Hong Kong won the match 1–0.

== Personal life ==
Chan became a father on 9 August 2010 when his wife gave birth to a son. He accompanied his wife in the hospital in the morning, then attended the Hong Kong national football team training in the afternoon.

After retirement from professional football, Chan signed an amateur contract with Eastern District. He currently works as a real estate agent during the day.

== Career statistics ==
=== Club ===
As of 1 July 2012

Club performance			League		Cup		League Cup		Continental		Total	
Season	Club	League	Apps	Goals	Apps	Goals	Apps	Goals	Apps	Goals	Apps	Goals
Hong Kong			League		FA Cup & Shield		League Cup		Asia		Total	
1998–99	Rangers (HKG)	First Division							–			
1999–2000	Yee Hope	First Division							–			
2000–01	Rangers (HKG)	First Division							–			
2001–02	Rangers (HKG)	First Division							–			
2002–03	Rangers (HKG)	First Division							–			
2003–04	Rangers (HKG)	First Division							–			
2004–05	Rangers (HKG)	First Division							–			
2005–06	Rangers (HKG)	First Division							–			
2006–07	Rangers (HKG)	First Division	15	1	1	0	4	0	–		20	1
2006–07	South China	First Division	–		4	0	–		–		4	0
2007–08	South China	First Division	15	1	2	0	4	0	5	0	26	2
2008–09	South China	First Division	16	2	2	0	0	0	3	0	21	2
2009–10	South China	First Division	12	0	4	0	–		4	0	24	0
2010–11	Rangers (HKG)	First Division	?						–			
2010–11	South China	First Division	4	0	3	1	–		5	0	12	1
2011–12	South China	First Division	14	1	5	1	2	1	–		21	3
Total	Hong Kong											
Career total												

=== International ===
As of 7 June 2017

National team	Club	Season	Apps	Goals	Captain
Hong Kong	Yee Hope	2000–01	1	0	0
Hong Kong	Rangers (HKG)	2002–03	3	0	0
Hong Kong	Rangers (HKG)	2003–04	6	0	0
Hong Kong	Rangers (HKG)	2004–05	4	1	0
Hong Kong	Rangers (HKG)	2005–06	3	0	0
Hong Kong	Rangers (HKG)	2006–07	4	0	0
Hong Kong	South China	2007–08	8	0	0
Hong Kong	South China	2008–09	0	0	0
Hong Kong	South China	2009–10	7	2	1
Hong Kong	Rangers (HKG)	2010–11	4	0	2
Hong Kong	South China	2010–11	1	0	1
Hong Kong	South China	2011–12	8	1	8
Hong Kong	South China	2012–13	8	2	8
Hong Kong	South China	2013–14	1	0	1
Hong Kong	South China	2014–15	4	0	4
Hong Kong	South China	2015–16	1	0	1
Hong Kong	South China	2016–17	1	0	1
Total			64	6	27

== Honours ==
South China

- Hong Kong First Division: 2007–08, 2008–09, 2009–10, 2012–13
- Hong Kong League Cup: 2007–08
- Hong Kong Senior Shield: 2009–10
- Hong Kong League Cup: 2007–08, 2010–11

Hong Kong

- East Asian Football Championship Preliminary Competition: 2003
- East Asian Football Championship Semifinal Competition: 2009
- Long Teng Cup: 2010, 2011
- Guangdong-Hong Kong Cup: 2004, 2008, 2009, 2013

Hong Kong U23

- East Asian Games: 2009

Individual

- Hong Kong Top Footballers: 2006–07, 2009–10, 2012–13
- Hong Kong Top Footballer Awards Most Popular Player: 2012–13
