= List of football clubs in Hong Kong =

This is a list of football clubs that play in the four levels of the Hong Kong football league system.

== By League and Division ==
- Premier League
- First Division
- Second Division
- Third Division

== Alphabetically ==
The divisions are correct for the 2026–27 season. Most teams competing in the lower division (First Division, Second Division and Third Division) do not have their own home ground. It is denoted by an "N/A" in the "Home Ground" column.

=== B ===
Club	League/Division in 2026–27	Lvl	Home Ground	Location
Bright Cerulean	First Division	2	N/A	N/A

=== C ===
Club	League/Division in 2026–27	Lvl	Home Ground	Location
Central & Western	First Division	2	N/A	N/A
Citizen AA	First Division	2	N/A	N/A

=== D ===
Club	League/Division in 2026–27	Lvl	Home Ground	Location
Double Flower	Second Division	3	N/A	N/A

=== E ===
Club	League/Division in 2026–27	Lvl	Home Ground	Location
Eastern	Premier League	1	Mong Kok Stadium	Mong Kok, Kowloon
Eastern District	Premier League	1	Siu Sai Wan Sports Ground	Siu Sai Wan, Hong Kong Island
ERSA	Third Division	4	N/A	N/A

=== F ===
Club	League/Division in 2026–27	Lvl	Home Ground	Location
Fu Moon	Second Division	3	N/A	N/A

=== G ===
Club	League/Division in 2026–27	Lvl	Home Ground	Location
Gospel	Second Division	3	N/A	N/A

=== H ===
Club	League/Division in 2026–27	Lvl	Home Ground	Location
Harmony	First Division	2	N/A	N/A
Hoi King	First Division	2	N/A	N/A
Hong Kong FC	Premier League	1	Hong Kong Football Club Stadium	Happy Valley, Hong Kong Island

=== I ===
Club	League/Division in 2026–27	Lvl	Home Ground	Location
Islands	Third Division	4	N/A	N/A

=== K ===
Club	League/Division in 2026–27	Lvl	Home Ground	Location
KCDRSC	Third Division	4	N/A	N/A
Kitchee	Premier League	1	Tseung Kwan O Sports Ground	Tseung Kwan O, New Territories
Kong Kit	Third Division	4	N/A	N/A
Konter	Third Division	4	N/A	N/A
Kowloon City	Premier League	1	Sham Shui Po Sports Ground	Sham Shui Po, Kowloon
Kowloon Cricket Club	Second Division	3	N/A	N/A
Kui Tan	First Division	2	N/A	N/A
Kwai Tsing	Second Division	3	N/A	N/A
P.B Alliance	Second Division	3	N/A	N/A
Kwun Tong	Second Division	3	N/A	N/A

=== L ===
Club	League/Division in 2026–27	Lvl	Home Ground	Location
Leaper	First Division	2	N/A	N/A
Lee Man	Premier League	1	Mong Kok Stadium	Mong Kok, Kowloon
Lucky Mile	First Division	2	N/A	N/A

=== M ===
Club	League/Division in 2026–27	Lvl	Home Ground	Location
Mutual	Third Division	4	N/A	N/A

=== N ===
Club	League/Division in 2026–27	Lvl	Home Ground	Location
North District	Premier League	1	North District Sports Ground	Sheung Shui, New Territories

=== O ===
Club	League/Division in 2026–27	Lvl	Home Ground	Location
Orion	Third Division	4	N/A	N/A
Ornament	Third Division	4	N/A	N/A

=== Q ===
Club	League/Division in 2026–27	Lvl	Home Ground	Location
Qi Yi	Third Division	4	N/A	N/A

=== R ===
Club	League/Division in 2026–27	Lvl	Home Ground	Location
Rangers	Premier League	1	Tsing Yi Sports Ground	Tsing Yi, New Territories
Ravia	Third Division	4	N/A	N/A
Resources Capital	First Division	2	N/A	N/A

=== S ===
Club	League/Division in 2026–27	Lvl	Home Ground	Location
Sai Kung	Third Division	4	N/A	N/A
Shatin	Premier League	1	Sha Tin Sports Ground; Hammer Hill Road Sports Ground	Shatin, New Territories; Diamond Hill, Kowloon
Sham Shui Po	First Division	2	N/A	N/A
Sky Leader	First Division	2	N/A	N/A
SkyWolf	Third Division	4	N/A	N/A
Soar FC	Third Division	4	N/A	N/A
South China	First Division	2	N/A	N/A
Southern	Premier League	1	Aberdeen Sports Ground	Aberdeen, Hong Kong Island
St. Joseph's	Third Division	4	N/A	N/A
Sui Tung	Second Division	3	N/A	N/A
Sun Hei	Second Division	3	N/A	N/A

=== T ===
Club	League/Division in 2026–27	Lvl	Home Ground	Location
Tai Po	Premier League	1	Tai Po Sports Ground	Tai Po, New Territories
Tsuen Wan	Second Division	3	N/A	N/A
Tsun Tat	Second Division	3	N/A	N/A
Tuen Mun	Second Division	3	N/A	N/A
Tuen Mun FC	Third Division	4	N/A	N/A
Tung Sing	First Division	2	N/A	N/A

=== U ===
Club	League/Division in 2026–27	Lvl	Home Ground	Location
UKFA	Third Division	4	N/A	N/A

=== W ===
Club	League/Division in 2026–27	Lvl	Home Ground	Location
Wan Chai	Second Division	3	N/A	N/A
Wing Yee	Second Division	3	N/A	N/A
Wong Tai Sin	Second Division	3	N/A	N/A

=== Y ===
Club	League/Division in 2026–27	Lvl	Home Ground	Location
Yau Tsim Mong	Second Division	3	N/A	N/A
Yuen Long	First Division	2	N/A	N/A
