= 2013–14 Hong Kong Second Division League =

Hong Kong Second Division League
- Season: 2013–14
- Matches: 100
- Goals: 359 (3.59 per match)
- Biggest home win: Week 5 Hong Kong FC 7–0 Tuen Mun FC; Week 11; Hong Kong FC 7–0 Wing Yee
- Biggest away win: Week 1 Wanchai 0–6 Wong Tai Sin; Week 8 Tuen Mun FC 1–7 Wofoo Tai Po
- Highest scoring: Week 8 Tuen Mun FC 1–7 Wofoo Tai Po
- Longest winning run: 6 games Hong Kong FC
- Longest unbeaten run: 10 games Wofoo Tai Po; Wong Tai Sin
- Longest winless run: 10 games Wing Yee
- Longest losing run: 7 games Tuen Mun FC

The 2013–14 Hong Kong Second Division League was the 68th season of Hong Kong Second Division League, the second-tier football league in Hong Kong.

The league started in September 2013 and ended in May 2014.

== Teams ==
=== Changes from preceding season ===
==== From Second Division League ====
Promoted to First Division League

- Yuen Long
- Happy Valley
- Eastern Salon

Relegated to Third Division League

- Sham Shui Po

==== To Second Division League ====
Relegated from First Division League

- Wofoo Tai Po

Promoted from Third Division League

- Wong Tai Sin
- Lucky Mile
- Kwun Tong
- Kwai Tsing

=== Team review ===
A total of 12 teams contested the league, including 7 sides from the 2012–13, 1 team relegated from the First Division and 4 sides promoted from the Third Division.

Club	Position in 2012–13	Member since season	Consecutive season in league
Double Flower FA	9th	2002–03	12
Hong Kong FC	5th	2011–12	3
Kwai Tsing District FA	4th in Third Division	2013–14	1
Kwun Tong FA	3rd in Third Division	2013–14	1
Lucky Mile	2nd in Third Division	2013–14	1
Shatin SA	7th	2010–11	4
Tai Chung FC	4th	2011–12	3
Tuen Mun FC	10th	2012–13	2
Wanchai SF	8th	2011–12	3
Wing Yee FT	6th	2008–09	6
Wofoo Tai Po	10th in First Division	2013–14	1
Wong Tai Sin District RSC	1st in Third Division	2013–14	1

=== Foreign players ===
The number of foreign players is restricted to three .

Team	Player 1	Player 2	Player 3
Double Flower FA	Anane	John Emmanuel	
Hong Kong FC	Robert Bacon	Liam Brannan	Gheczy Gergely Zoltan
Kwai Tsing District FA	Jerome De Clarens		
Kwun Tong FA	Medard Privat		
Lucky Mile	Marco Julio	Shinnosuke Kawasaki	James Beacher
Shatin SA	Cheang Cheng Ieong		
Tai Chung FC	Roberto Rodríguez		
Tuen Mun FC	Abah	Kewin Gregory	
Wanchai SF			
Wing Yee FT	Guy Martial		
Wofoo Tai Po	Caleb Ekwegwo	Chupe	Sergio Kirienko
Wong Tai Sin	Celistanus Tita Chou	Paul Ngue	

== League table ==
Pos	Team	Pld	W	D	L	GF	GA	GD	Pts	Promotion or relegation
1	Wofoo Tai Po	22	17	5	0	67	11	+56	56	Promotion to Premier League
2	Wong Tai Sin	22	17	3	2	56	12	+44	54	Promotion to Premier League
3	Hong Kong FC	22	16	3	3	68	19	+49	51	
4	Shatin	22	13	5	4	54	23	+31	44	
5	Double Flower	22	10	4	8	56	36	+20	34	
6	Tai Chung	22	9	1	12	42	66	−24	28	
7	Kwai Tsing	22	8	3	11	43	54	−11	27	
8	Kwun Tong	22	7	2	13	24	42	−18	23	
9	Wanchai	22	6	3	13	20	44	−24	21	
10	Lucky Mile	22	6	0	16	24	60	−36	18	
11	Wing Yee	22	2	6	14	21	58	−37	12	Relegation to Second Division
12	Tuen Mun FC	22	3	1	18	34	84	−50	10	Relegation to Second Division

Updated to match(es) played on 10 May 2014. Source: Hong Kong Football Association
Rules for classification: 1) points; 2) head-to-head points; 3) head-to-head goal difference; 4) head-to-head goals scored; 5) goal difference; 6) number of goals scored.

=== Positions by round ===
To preserve the chronological order of events, any postponed matches are not included to the round at which they were originally scheduled, but added to the full round they were played immediately afterwards. For example, if a match is scheduled for round 7, but then played between rounds 8 and 9, it will be added to the standings for round 8.

Team ╲ Round	1	2	3	4	5	6	7	8	9	10	11	12	13	14	15	16	17	18	19	20	21	22
Double Flower	7	7	8	9	8	8	7	7	5	5	4	6	7	8	8	6	7					
Hong Kong FC	6	6	5	3	3	1	1	1	2	2	2	3	3	3	3	2	2					
Kwai Tsing	9	9	7	7	7	7	9	9	9	9	9	8	6	7	7	7	8					
Kwun Tong	11	11	6	4	4	5	5	5	6	6	7	7	8	5	5	8	6					
Lucky Mile	10	10	10	10	10	10	8	8	8	8	8	9	9	9	9	9	9					
Shatin	4	4	9	6	6	6	6	6	7	7	6	4	4	4	4	4	4					
Tai Chung	5	5	3	5	5	4	4	4	4	4	5	5	5	6	6	5	5					
Tuen Mun FC	3	3	4	8	9	9	10	10	12	12	12	12	12	12	11	11	11					
Wanchai	12	12	12	12	12	12	12	12	10	10	10	10	10	10	10	10	10					
Wing Yee	8	8	11	11	11	11	11	11	11	11	11	11	11	11	12	12	12					
Wofoo Tai Po	2	2	1	1	2	3	2	2	1	1	1	2	2	2	2	3	3					
Wong Tai Sin	1	1	2	2	1	2	3	3	3	3	3	1	1	1	1	1	1					

Leader; Promotion to 2014–15 Hong Kong First Division League
Relegation to 2014–15 Hong Kong Third Division League

Updated to match(es) played on 9 March 2014. Source:

== Results ==
Home \ Away	DFL	HKF	KTD	KTF	LML	SHA	TAI	TMF	WCH	WYE	TPO	WTS
Double Flower		1–2	1–1	1–0	2–1	1–3	2–3	6–3	2–1	3–0	1–3	0–3
Hong Kong FC	2–1		6–1		3–0	4–2	2–1	7–0	2–0	7–0	0–0	0–2
Kwai Tsing	1–5	1–3		2–1		0–0	8–4	2–0	0–1	1–4	0–3	1–1
Kwun Tong	1–2	0–4	1–3		0–2	0–2	2–1	6–0	1–0	3–2	0–4	0–2
Lucky Mile	0–5	0–3	3–2	0–1		0–4	1–3	4–2	3–1	1–0	1–7	0–4
Shatin	2–2	1–1	3–1	0–1	4–0		2–1	3–1	4–1	6–2	1–1	1–0
Tai Chung		1–3	3–1	0–1	3–2	0–0		4–1	2–3	3–0	0–5	1–5
Tuen Mun FC	2–4	2–7	1–3	4–2	4–1		3–5		1–2	2–2	1–7	0–3
Wanchai	0–0	0–2	2–5	1–0	2–1	0–3	0–1	3–0			1–2	0–6
Wing Yee	1–1	3–2	0–5	1–1	0–1	2–4	1–3	0–3	1–1		0–2	1–1
Wofoo Tai Po	2–1	0–0	5–0	1–1	3–0	1–0	4–1	3–1	6–0	5–0		
Wong Tai Sin	3–1	1–0	4–0	2–0	2–0	2–1	6–0	2–1	2–1	3–1	1–1	

Updated to match(es) played on 25 April 2014. Source:
Legend: Blue = home team win; Yellow = draw; Red = away team win.

== Fixtures and results ==
=== Round 1 ===
14 September 2013	Hong Kong FC	2–1	Double Flower	Happy Valley, Hong Kong Island
20:15 UTC+8	Schipper 20'; Freser 54'; Davies (yellow card) 78'	Report	John 22'	Stadium: Hong Kong Football Club Stadium

15 September 2013	Kwun Tong	0–4	Wofoo Tai Po	Wong Tai Sin, Kowloon
13:30 UTC+8	Ho Chin To (yellow card) 9'	Report	1' Sze Kin Wai; 9', 56' Caleb; 70' Cheung Wai Fai	Stadium: Po Kong Village Road Park #1

15 September 2013	Tuen Mun FC	4–1	Lucky Mile	Wong Tai Sin, Kowloon
13:30 UTC+8	Sin Chi Ho 59'; Leung Chi Fai 62'; Li Kwok Fan 85'; Chamard-Boudet 87'	Report	(yellow card) 57' Barnett; 80' Crompton	Stadium: Po Kong Village Road Park #2

15 September 2013	Tai Chung	3–1	Kwai Tsing	Wong Tai Sin, Kowloon
15:30 UTC+8	Ip Kwok Hei 35', 40' (yellow card) 65'; So Chun Yin 45'; Chan Ho Chun (yellow card) 52'; Losada (yellow card) 90+2'	Report	75' Lau Chi Keung	Stadium: Po Kong Village Road Park #2

15 September 2013	Wanchai	0–6	Wong Tai Sin	Happy Valley, Hong Kong Island
15:30 UTC+8	Chan Kin Chung (yellow card) 26'	Report	31' (yellow card) 59' Lau Kwun Pong; 40' Wong King Wa; 72' Tam Chi Kit; 73' Lau Tsz Kin; 79' So Sheung Wai; 81' Chou	Stadium: Happy Valley Recreation Ground #6

15 September 2013	Wing Yee	2–4	Shatin	Wong Tai Sin, Kowloon
15:30 UTC+8	Yau Ping Kai 31', 59'; Cheung Kai Ming (yellow card) 65'	Report	15' Wong Fung Tat; 26' Hon Shing; 78' Ng Ka Ming; 81' Tam Yu Fai	Stadium: Po Kong Village Road Park #1

=== Round 2 ===
19 January 2014 Postponed	Wing Yee	0–5	Kwai Tsing	Kowloon City, Kowloon
13:30 UTC+8		Report		Stadium: Kowloon Tsai Park #1

19 January 2014 Postponed	Double Flower	0–3	Wong Tai Sin	Ma On Shan, New Territories
13:30 UTC+8		Report		Stadium: Ma On Shan Recreation Ground

19 January 2014 Postponed	Kwun Tong	6–0	Tuen Mun FC	Kowloon City, Kowloon
15:30 UTC+8		Report		Stadium: Kowloon Tsai Park #1

19 January 2014 Postponed	Shatin	4–0	Lucky Mile	Ma On Shan, New Territories
15:30 UTC+8		Report		Stadium: Ma On Shan Recreation Ground

19 January 2014 Postponed	Wanchai	0–1	Tai Chung	Happy Valley, Hong Kong Island
15:30 UTC+8		Report		Stadium: Happy Valley Recreation Ground #6

6 April 2014 Postponed	Hong Kong FC	v	Wofoo Tai Po	Happy Valley, Hong Kong Island
15:00 UTC+8				Stadium: Hong Kong Football Club Stadium

Remark: Week 2 matches were cancelled and postponed due to typhoon.

=== Round 3 ===
28 September 2013	Lucky Mile	3–1	Wanchai	Happy Valley, Hong Kong Island
20:15 UTC+8		Report		Stadium: Hong Kong Football Club Stadium

29 September 2013	Double Flower	3–0	Wing Yee	Wong Tai Sin, Kowloon
13:30 UTC+8		Report		Stadium: Po Kong Village Road Park #1

29 September 2013	Kwai Tsing	2–0	Tuen Mun FC	Tai Po, New Territories
13:30 UTC+8		Report		Stadium: Kwong Fuk Park

29 September 2013	Shatin	0–1	Kwun Tong	Ma On Shan, New Territories
15:30 UTC+8		Report		Stadium: Ma On Shan Recreation Ground

29 September 2013	Wofoo Tai Po	4–1	Tai Chung	Tai Po, New Territories
15:30 UTC+8		Report		Stadium: Kwong Fuk Park

29 September 2013	Wong Tai Sin	1–0	Hong Kong FC	Wong Tai Sin, Kowloon
15:30 UTC+8		Report		Stadium: Po Kong Village Road Park #1

=== Round 4 ===
6 October 2013	Lucky Mile	0–1	Kwun Tong	Happy Valley, Hong Kong Island
13:30 UTC+8		Report		Stadium: Hong Kong Football Club Stadium

6 October 2013	Tai Chung	0–0	Shatin	Tai Po, New Territories
13:30 UTC+8		Report		Stadium: Kwong Fuk Park

6 October 2013	Wanchai	0–2	Hong Kong FC	Happy Valley, Hong Kong Island
13:30 UTC+8		Report		Stadium: Happy Valley Recreation Ground #6

6 October 2013	Wofoo Tai Po	2–1	Double Flower	Tai Po, New Territories
15:30 UTC+8		Report		Stadium: Kwong Fuk Park

6 October 2013	Tuen Mun FC	2–2	Wing Yee	Tsing Yi, New Territories
18:30 UTC+8		Report		Stadium: Tsing Yi Northeast Park

6 October 2013	Kwai Tsing	1–1	Wong Tai Sin	Tsing Yi, New Territories
20:30 UTC+8		Report		Stadium: Tsing Yi Northeast Park

=== Round 5 ===
12 October 2013	Hong Kong FC	7–0	Tuen Mun FC	Happy Valley, Hong Kong Island
20:15 UTC+8		Report		Stadium: Hong Kong Football Club Stadium

13 October 2013	Kwun Tong	1–0	Wanchai	Kowloon City, Kowloon
15:30 UTC+8		Report		Stadium: Kowloon Tsai Park Artificial Turf Football Pitch

13 October 2013	Wong Tai Sin	2–0	Lucky Mile	Wong Tai Sin, Kowloon
15:30 UTC+8		Report		Stadium: Po Kong Village Road Park #1

13 October 2013	Shatin	1–1	Wofoo Tai Po	Ma On Shan, New Territories
15:30 UTC+8		Report		Stadium: Ma On Shan Recreation Ground

13 October 2013	Wing Yee	1–3	Tai Chung	Tai Po, New Territories
15:30 UTC+8		Report		Stadium: Kwong Fuk Park

13 October 2013	Double Flower	1–1	Kwai Tsing	Tsing Yi, New Territories
15:30 UTC+8		Report		Stadium: Tsing Yi Northeast Park

=== Round 6 ===
20 October 2013	Kwun Tong	0–4	Hong Kong FC	Wong Tai Sin, Kowloon
13:30 UTC+8		Report		Stadium: Po Kong Village Road Park #1

20 October 2013	Double Flower	2–3	Tai Chung	Wong Tai Sin, Kowloon
13:30 UTC+8		Report		Stadium: Po Kong Village Road Park #2

20 October 2013	Wong Tai Sin	1–1	Wofoo Tai Po	Wong Tai Sin, Kowloon
15:30 UTC+8		Report		Stadium: Po Kong Village Road Park #1

20 October 2013	Wing Yee	1–1	Wanchai	Wong Tai Sin, Kowloon
15:30 UTC+8		Report		Stadium: Po Kong Village Road Park #2

20 October 2013	Shatin	3–1	Tuen Mun FC	Ma On Shan, New Territories
15:30 UTC+8		Report		Stadium: Ma On Shan Recreation Ground

16 November 2013 Postponed	Lucky Mile	3–2	Kwai Tsing	Happy Valley, Hong Kong Island
20:15 UTC+8		Report		Stadium: Hong Kong Football Club Stadium

=== Round 7 ===
27 October 2013	Tai Chung	4–1	Tuen Mun FC	Wong Tai Sin, Kowloon
13:30 UTC+8		Report		Stadium: Po Kong Village Road Park #1

27 October 2013	Lucky Mile	1–0	Wing Yee	Happy Valley, Hong Kong Island
13:30 UTC+8		Report		Stadium: Hong Kong Football Club Stadium

27 October 2013	Wong Tai Sin	2–1	Shatin	Wong Tai Sin, Kowloon
15:30 UTC+8		Report		Stadium: Po Kong Village Road Park #1

27 October 2013	Kwai Tsing	1–3	Hong Kong FC	Tsing Yi, New Territories
15:30 UTC+8		Report		Stadium: Tsing Yi Northeast Park

27 October 2013	Double Flower	1–0	Kwun Tong	Tai Po, New Territories
18:30 UTC+8		Report		Stadium: Kwong Fuk Park

27 October 2013	Wofoo Tai Po	6–0	Wanchai	Tai Po, New Territories
20:30 UTC+8		Report		Stadium: Kwong Fuk Park

=== Round 8 ===
2 November 2013	Hong Kong FC	3–0	Lucky Mile	Happy Valley, Hong Kong Island
20:15 UTC+8		Report		Stadium: Hong Kong Football Club Stadium

3 November 2013	Tuen Mun FC	1–7	Wofoo Tai Po	Kowloon City, Kowloon
13:30 UTC+8		Report		Stadium: Kowloon Tsai Park Artificial Turf Football Pitch

3 November 2013	Wing Yee	1–1	Wong Tai Sin	Ma On Shan, New Territories
13:30 UTC+8		Report		Stadium: Ma On Shan Recreation Ground

3 November 2013	Kwun Tong	2–1	Tai Chung	Kowloon City, Kowloon
15:30 UTC+8		Report		Stadium: Kowloon Tsai Park Artificial Turf Football Pitch

3 November 2013	Shatin	2–2	Double Flower	Ma On Shan, New Territories
15:30 UTC+8		Report		Stadium: Ma On Shan Recreation Ground

5 March 2014 Rescheduled	Wanchai	2–5	Kwai Tsing	Shek Kip Mei, Kowloon
20:30 UTC+8	=	Report		Stadium: Shek Kip Mei Park

=== Round 9 ===
10 November 2013	Lucky Mile	0–5	Double Flower	Happy Valley, Hong Kong Island
13:00 UTC+8		Report		Stadium: Hong Kong Football Club Stadium

10 November 2013	Tuen Mun FC	1–2	Wanchai	Tsing Yi, New Territories
13:30 UTC+8		Report		Stadium: Tsing Yi Northeast Park

10 November 2013	Kwai Tsing	0–0	Shatin	Tsing Yi, New Territories
15:30 UTC+8		Report		Stadium: Tsing Yi Northeast Park

10 November 2013	Wong Tai Sin	2–0	Kwun Tong	Wong Tai Sin, Kowloon
15:30 UTC+8		Report		Stadium: Po Kong Village Road Park #1

10 November 2013	Tai Chung	1–3	Hong Kong FC	Tai Po, New Territories
16:30 UTC+8		Report		Stadium: Kwong Fuk Park

10 November 2013	Wofoo Tai Po	5–0	Wing Yee	Tai Po, New Territories
18:30 UTC+8		Report		Stadium: Kwong Fuk Park

=== Round 10 ===
24 November 2013	Lucky Mile	1–3	Tai Chung	Happy Valley, Hong Kong Island
13:30 UTC+8		Report		Stadium: Hong Kong Football Club Stadium

24 November 2013	Double Flower	2–1	Wanchai	Wong Tai Sin, Kowloon
13:30 UTC+8		Report		Stadium: Po Kong Village Road Park #1

24 November 2013	Wing Yee	1–1	Kwun Tong	Tsing Yi, New Territories
13:30 UTC+8		Report		Stadium: Tsing Yi Northeast Park

24 November 2013	Wong Tai Sin	2–1	Tuen Mun FC	Wong Tai Sin, Kowloon
15:30 UTC+8		Report		Stadium: Po Kong Village Road Park #1

24 November 2013	Kwai Tsing	0–3	Wofoo Tai Po	Tsing Yi, New Territories
15:30 UTC+8		Report		Stadium: Tsing Yi Northeast Park

24 November 2013	Shatin	1–1	Hong Kong FC	Ma On Shan, New Territories
15:30 UTC+8		Report		Stadium: Ma On Shan Recreation Ground

=== Round 11 ===
30 November 2013	Hong Kong FC	7–0	Wing Yee	Happy Valley, Hong Kong Island
20:15 UTC+8		Report		Stadium: Hong Kong Football Club Stadium

1 December 2013	Tai Chung	1–5	Wong Tai Sin	Happy Valley, Hong Kong Island
13:30 UTC+8		Report		Stadium: Happy Valley Recreation Ground #6

1 December 2013	Tuen Mun FC	2–4	Double Flower	Tsing Yi, New Territories
13:30 UTC+8		Report		Stadium: Tsing Yi Northeast Park

1 December 2013	Wanchai	0–3	Shatin	Happy Valley, Hong Kong Island
15:30 UTC+8		Report		Stadium: Happy Valley Recreation Ground #6

1 December 2013	Kwai Tsing	2–1	Kwun Tong	Tsing Yi, New Territories
13:30 UTC+8		Report		Stadium: Tsing Yi Northeast Park

1 December 2013	Wofoo Tai Po	3–0	Lucky Mile	Tai Po, New Territories
15:30 UTC+8		Report		Stadium: Kwong Fuk Park

=== Round 12 ===
25 January 2014	Hong Kong FC	0–2	Wong Tai Sin	Happy Valley, Hong Kong Island
20:15 UTC+8		Report		Stadium: Hong Kong Football Club Stadium

26 January 2014	Kwun Tong	0–2	Shatin	Wong Tai Sin, Kowloon
13:30 UTC+8		Report		Stadium: Po Kong Village Road Park #1

26 January 2014	Tuen Mun FC	1–3	Kwai Tsing	Wong Tai Sin, Kowloon
13:30 UTC+8		Report		Stadium: Po Kong Village Road Park #2

26 January 2014	Tai Chung	0–5	Wofoo Tai Po	Wong Tai Sin, Kowloon
15:30 UTC+8		Report		Stadium: Po Kong Village Road Park #1

26 January 2014	Wing Yee	1–1	Double Flower	Wong Tai Sin, Kowloon
15:30 UTC+8		Report		Stadium: Po Kong Village Road Park #2

26 January 2014	Wanchai	2–1	Lucky Mile	Happy Valley, Hong Kong Island
15:30 UTC+8		Report		Stadium: Happy Valley Recreation Ground #6

=== Round 13 ===
9 February 2014	Lucky Mile	4–2	Tuen Mun FC	Happy Valley, Hong Kong Island
13:30 UTC+8		Report		Stadium: Hong Kong Football Club Stadium

9 February 2014	Wong Tai Sin	2–1	Wanchai	Kowloon City, Kowloon
13:30 UTC+8		Report		Stadium: Kowloon Tsai Park #1

9 February 2014	Kwai Tsing	8–4	Tai Chung	Ma On Shan, New Territories
13:30 UTC+8		Report		Stadium: Ma On Shan Recreation Ground

9 February 2014	Double Flower	1–2	Hong Kong FC	Tai Po, New Territories
13:30 UTC+8		Report		Stadium: Kwong Fuk Park

9 February 2014	Shatin	6–2	Wing Yee	Ma On Shan, New Territories
15:30 UTC+8		Report		Stadium: Ma On Shan Recreation Ground

9 February 2014	Wofoo Tai Po	1–1	Kwun Tong	Tai Po, New Territories
15:30 UTC+8		Report		Stadium: Kwong Fuk Park

=== Round 14 ===
15 February 2014	Lucky Mile	0–3	Hong Kong FC	Happy Valley, Hong Kong Island
20:15 UTC+8		Report		Stadium: Hong Kong Football Club Stadium

16 February 2014	Double Flower	1–3	Shatin	Wong Tai Sin, Kowloon
13:30 UTC+8		Report		Stadium: Po Kong Village Road Park #1

16 February 2014	Tai Chung	0–1	Kwun Tong	Wong Tai Sin, Kowloon
13:30 UTC+8		Report		Stadium: Po Kong Village Road Park #2

16 February 2014	Wong Tai Sin	3–1	Wing Yee	Wong Tai Sin, Kowloon
15:30 UTC+8		Report		Stadium: Po Kong Village Road Park #1

16 February 2014	Kwai Tsing	v	Wanchai	Wong Tai Sin, Kowloon
15:30 UTC+8				Stadium: Po Kong Village Road Park #2

16 February 2014	Wofoo Tai Po	3–1	Tuen Mun FC	Tai Po, New Territories
15:30 UTC+8		Report		Stadium: Kwong Fuk Park

=== Round 15 ===
23 February 2014	Hong Kong FC	2–0	Wanchai	Happy Valley, Hong Kong Island
13:30 UTC+8		Report		Stadium: Hong Kong Football Club Stadium

23 February 2014	Wing Yee	0–3	Tuen Mun FC	Tsing Yi, New Territories
13:30 UTC+8		Report		Stadium: Tsing Yi Northeast Park

23 February 2014	Wong Tai Sin	4–0	Kwai Tsing	Kowloon City, Kowloon
13:30 UTC+8		Report		Stadium: Kwoloon Tsai Park #1

23 February 2014	Double Flower	1–3	Wofoo Tai Po	Tsing Yi, New Territories
15:30 UTC+8		Report		Stadium: Tsing Yi Northeast Park

23 February 2014	Kwun Tong	0–2	Lucky Mile	Kowloon City, Kowloon
15:30 UTC+8		Report		Stadium: Kwoloon Tsai Park #1

23 February 2014	Shatin	2–1	Tai Chung	Ma On Shan, New Territories
15:30 UTC+8		Report		Stadium: Ma On Shan Recreation Ground

=== Round 16 ===
2 March 2014	Lucky Mile	0–4	Wong Tai Sin	Happy Valley, Hong Kong Island
13:30 UTC+8		Report		Stadium: Hong Kong Football Club Stadium

2 March 2014	Tai Chung	3–0	Wing Yee	Tai Po, New Territories
13:30 UTC+8		Report		Stadium: Kwong Fuk Park

2 March 2014	Tuen Mun FC	2–7	Hong Kong FC	Tsing Yi, New Territories
13:30 UTC+8		Report		Stadium: Tsing Yi Northeast Park

2 March 2014	Kwai Tsing	1–5	Double Flower	Tsing Yi, New Territories
15:30 UTC+8		Report		Stadium: Tsing Yi Northeast Park

2 March 2014	Wanchai	1–0	Kwun Tong	Happy Valley, Hong Kong Island
15:30 UTC+8		Report		Stadium: Happy Valley Recreation Ground #6

30 March 2014	Wofoo Tai Po	1–0	Shatin	Fanling, New Territories
13:30 UTC+8				Stadium: Fanling Recreation Ground

=== Round 17 ===
8 March 2014	Hong Kong FC	4–2	Shatin	Happy Valley, Hong Kong Island
20:15 UTC+8		Report		Stadium: Hong Kong Football Club Stadium

9 March 2014	Wanchai	0–0	Double Flower	Tai Po, New Territories
13:30 UTC+8		Report		Stadium: Kwong Fuk Park

9 March 2014	Wofoo Tai Po	5–0	Kwai Tsing	Tai Po, New Territories
15:30 UTC+8		Report		Stadium: Kwong Fuk Park

9 March 2014	Kwun Tong	3–2	Wing Yee	Kowloon City, Kowloon
15:30 UTC+8		Report		Stadium: Kowloon Tsai Park #1

9 March 2014	Tai Chung	3–2	Lucky Mile	Ma On Shan, New Territories
15:30 UTC+8		Report		Stadium: Man on Shan Recreation Ground

9 March 2014	Tuen Mun FC	0–3	Wong Tai Sin	Tuen Mun, New Territories
15:30 UTC+8		Report		Stadium: Wu Shan Recreation Ground

=== Round 18 ===
16 March 2014	Hong Kong FC	2–1	Tai Chung	Happy Valley, Hong Kong Island
13:30 UTC+8				Stadium: Hong Kong Football Club Stadium

16 March 2014	Kwun Tong	0–2	Wong Tai Sin	Wong Tai Sin, Kowloon
13:30 UTC+8				Stadium: Po Kog Village Road Park #1

16 March 2014	Wing Yee	0–2	Wofoo Tai Po	Wong Tai Sin, Kowloon
15:30 UTC+8				Stadium: Po Kog Village Road Park #1

16 March 2014	Wanchai	3–0	Tuen Mun FC	Happy Valley, Hong Kong Island
15:30 UTC+8				Stadium: Happy Valley Recreation Ground #6

16 March 2014	Double Flower	2–1	Lucky Mile	Wong Tai Sin, Kowloon
15:30 UTC+8				Stadium: Po Kog Village Road Park #2

16 March 2014	Shatin	3–1	Kwai Tsing	Ma On Shan, New Territories
15:30 UTC+8				Stadium: Ma On Shan Recreation Ground

=== Round 19 ===
23 March 2014	Hong Kong FC	6–1	Kwai Tsing	Happy Valley, Hong Kong Island
13:30 UTC+8				Stadium: Hong Kong Football Club Stadium

23 March 2014	Wanchai	1–2	Wofoo Tai Po	Happy Valley, Hong Kong Island
15:30 UTC+8				Stadium: Happy Valley Recreation Ground #6

23 March 2014	Shatin	1–0	Wong Tai Sin	Kowloon City, Kowloon
15:30 UTC+8				Stadium: Kowloon Tsai Park #1

23 March 2014	Kwun Tong	1–2	Double Flower	Wong Tai Sin, Kowloon
15:30 UTC+8				Stadium: Po Kong Village Road Park #1

23 March 2014	Wing Yee	0–1	Lucky Mile	Wong Tai Sin, Kowloon
15:30 UTC+8				Stadium: Po Kong Village Road Park #2

23 March 2014	Tuen Mun FC	3–5	Tai Chung	Tuen Mun, New Territories
15:30 UTC+8				Stadium: Wu Shan Recreation Ground

=== Round 20 ===
12 February 2014 Rescheduled	Wofoo Tai Po	0–0	Hong Kong FC	Tai Po, Hong Kong Island
20:30 UTC+8		Report		Stadium: Kwong Fuk Park

5 April 2014	Lucky Mile	0–4	Shatin	Happy Valley, Hong Kong Island
20:15 UTC+8				Stadium: Hong Kong Football Club Stadium

6 April 2014	Tai Chung	2–3	Wanchai	Tsing Yi, New Territories
13:30 UTC+8				Stadium: Tsing Yi Northeast Park

6 April 2014	Kwai Tsing	1–4	Wing Yee	Tsing Yi, New Territories
15:30 UTC+8				Stadium: Tsing Yi Northeast Park

6 April 2014	Wong Tai Sin	3–1	Double Flower	Kowloon City, Kowloon
15:30 UTC+8				Stadium: Kowloon Tsai Park #1

6 April 2014	Tuen Mun	4–2	Kwun Tong	Tuen Mun, New Territories
15:30 UTC+8				Stadium: Wu Shan Recreayion Ground

=== Round 21 ===
13 April 2014	Lucky Mile	1–7	Wofoo Tai Po	Happy Valley, Hong Kong Island
13:30 UTC+8				Stadium: Hong Kong Football Club Stadium

13 April 2014	Wing Yee	3–2	Hong Kong FC	Wong Tai Sin, Kowloon
13:30 UTC+8				Stadium: Po Kong Village Road Park #1

13 April 2014	Kwun Tong	1–3	Kwai Tsing	Wong Tai Sin, Kowloon
13:30 UTC+8				Stadium: Po Kong Village Road Park #2

13 April 2014	Wong Tai Sin	6–0	Tai Chung	Wong Tai Sin, Kowloon
15:30 UTC+8				Stadium: Po Kong Village Road Park #1

13 April 2014	Double Flower	6–3	Tuen Mun FC	Wong Tai Sin, Kowloon
15:30 UTC+8				Stadium: Po Kong Village Road Park #2

13 April 2014	Shatin	4–1	Wanchai	Ma On Shan, New Territories
15:30 UTC+8				Stadium: Ma On Shan Recreation Ground

=== Round 22 ===
27 April 2014	Hong Kong FC	v	Kwun Tong	Happy Valley, Hong Kong Island
13:30 UTC+8				Stadium: Hong Kong Football Club Stadium

27 April 2014	Wanchai	v	Wing Yee	Happy Valley, Hong Kong Island
13:30 UTC+8				Stadium: Happy Valley Recreation Ground #6

27 April 2014	Tuen Mun FC	v	Shatin	Wong Tai Sin, Kowloon
13:30 UTC+8				Stadium: Po Kong Village Road Park #1

27 April 2014	Tai Chung	v	Double Flower	Ma On Shan, New Territories
13:30 UTC+8				Stadium: Ma On Shan Recreation Ground

27 April 2014	Wofoo Tai Po	v	Wong Tai Sin	Tai Po, New Territories
13:30 UTC+8				Stadium: Kwong Fuk Park

27 April 2014	Kwai Tsing	v	Lucky Mile	Tsing Yi, New Territories
13:30 UTC+8				Stadium: Tsing Yi Northeast Park
