= 2026–27 Hong Kong Second Division League =

Hong Kong Second Division
- Season: 2026–27
- Top goalscorer: Law Chun Yan (P.B. Alliance); Chan Kwong Ho (Sun Hei); Reinaldo Gaúcho (Double Flower); Wong Wai Kwok (Double Flower) (9 goals)
- Biggest home win: Double Flower 6-1 Gospel (6 September 2026); Double Flower 5-0 Tsuen Wan (18 October 2026)
- Biggest away win: Tsuen Wan 1-6 Sui Tung (15 November 2026)
- Highest scoring: Tsuen Wan 4-4 Sun Hei (11 October 2026)
- Longest winning run: 4 matches Double Flower; Kwai Tsing; P.B. Alliance
- Longest unbeaten run: 10 matches Double Flower; P.B. Alliance
- Longest winless run: 7 matches Kowloon Cricket Club; Tsuen Wan
- Longest losing run: 5 matches Tuen Mun

The 2026–27 Hong Kong Second Division League is the 13th season of the Hong Kong Second Division since it became the third-tier football league in Hong Kong in 2014–15. The season began on 6 September 2026.

== Teams ==
=== Changes from last season ===
==== From Second Division ====
===== Promoted to First Division =====
- Kui Tan
- Leaper

===== Relegated to Third Division =====
- Mutual

==== To Second Division ====
===== Relegated from First Division =====
- Kwun Tong

===== Promoted from Third Division =====
- Sun Hei
- Double Flower
- Tsun Tat

== League table ==
Pos	Team	Pld	W	D	L	GF	GA	GD	Pts	Promotion or relegation
1	P.B. Alliance	10	8	2	0	32	6	+26	26	Promotion to the First Division
2	Double Flower	10	8	2	0	33	8	+25	26	Promotion to the First Division
3	Kwun Tong	10	7	1	2	18	12	+6	22	
4	Fu Moon	10	5	3	2	22	9	+13	18	
5	Kwai Tsing	10	6	0	4	18	15	+3	18	
6	Tsun Tat	10	5	0	5	16	16	0	15	
7	Gospel	10	4	3	3	16	18	−2	15	
8	Wong Tai Sin	10	5	0	5	14	17	−3	15	
9	Sun Hei	10	4	3	3	22	16	+6	15	
10	Sui Tung	10	3	4	3	20	16	+4	13	
11	Wing Yee	10	2	3	5	11	18	−7	9	
12	Yau Tsim Mong	10	2	2	6	13	24	−11	8	
13	Kowloon Cricket Club	10	2	2	6	12	25	−13	8	
14	Wan Chai	10	2	1	7	11	21	−10	7	
15	Tuen Mun	10	2	1	7	11	28	−17	7	Relegation to the Third Division
16	Tsuen Wan	10	1	1	8	11	31	−20	4	Relegation to the Third Division

Updated to match(es) played on unknown. Source: Hong Kong Football Association
Rules for classification: 1) Points; 2) Head-to-head points; 3) Head-to-head goal difference; 4) Head-to-head goals scored; 5) Goal difference; 6) Goals scored; 7) Fair-play points; 8) Drawing lots
