= 2021–22 Hong Kong Second Division League =

Hong Kong Second Division
- Season: 2021–22
- Champions: None
- Promoted: Kowloon City; Kwai Tsing
- Relegated: None
- Matches played: 77
- Goals scored: 249 (3.23 per match)
- Top goalscorer: Hui Wang Fung (Kowloon City); 14 goals
- Biggest home win: Kowloon City 7–0 CFCSSHK (19 December 2021)
- Biggest away win: Mutual 0–8 Kowloon City (14 November 2021)
- Highest scoring: Mutual 0–8 Kowloon City (14 November 2021)

The 2021–22 Hong Kong Second Division League was the 8th season of the Hong Kong Second Division since it became the third-tier football league in Hong Kong in 2014–15. The season began on 26 September 2021.

== Effects of the COVID-19 pandemic ==
On 5 January 2022, the Hong Kong government announced a tightening of social distancing measures between 7 January to 20 January in order to control the Omicron outbreak. Public recreation facilities, such as football pitches, were closed and members of the public were barred from gathering in groups of more than two, making it impossible for the season to continue. The Hong Kong Football Association announced on the same day that it would also postpone any scheduled matches in the successive two week period.

After the measures were extended several times in the following weeks, the government announced on 22 February that it would extend the measures until 20 April, making it nearly impossible to complete the season before most player contracts expired on 31 May. The HKFA held an emergency meeting with the clubs on 25 February, after which it was determined that the remainder of the season would be cancelled.

== Format ==
Promotion and relegation were suspended during the 2020–21 season and the season was shortened to a single round-robin due to the COVID-19 pandemic in Hong Kong. As a result, all 14 teams from the previous season were permitted to remain during the 2021–22 season. However, Double Flower was suspended by the HKFA from joining the league for this season because of the disputes on the club's membership.

== League table ==
Pos	Team	Pld	W	D	L	GF	GA	GD	Pts	Promotion or relegation
1	Kowloon City (P)	12	10	1	1	48	7	+41	31	Promotion to the First Division
2	Tung Sing	12	9	2	1	28	9	+19	29	
3	Kwai Tsing (P)	12	7	1	4	25	17	+8	22	Promotion to the First Division
4	Lucky Mile	12	6	3	3	20	9	+11	21	
5	St. Joseph's	11	6	2	3	18	10	+8	20	
6	Tuen Mun	12	6	1	5	19	17	+2	19	
7	Yau Tsim Mong	12	5	2	5	15	24	−9	17	
8	Kwong Wah	12	4	2	6	15	21	−6	14	
9	Kwun Tong	11	2	4	5	8	16	−8	10	
10	Wan Chai	12	2	4	6	18	26	−8	10	
11	Mutual	12	2	3	7	10	28	−18	9	
12	CFCSSHK	12	2	2	8	12	29	−17	8	
13	Fu Moon	12	2	1	9	13	36	−23	7	

Updated to match(es) played on 19 December 2021. Source: Hong Kong Football Association
Rules for classification: 1) Points; 2) Head-to-head points; 3) Head-to-head goal difference; 4) Head-to-head goals scored; 5) Goal difference; 6) Goals scored; 7) Fair-play points; 8) Drawing lots
(P) Promoted
