= 2012–13 Hong Kong Third Division League =

Hong Kong Third Division League
- Season: 2012–13
- Promoted: Wong Tai Sin; Lucky Mile; Kwun Tong; Kwai Tsing
- Relegated: Fukien
- Matches played: 182
- Goals scored: 519 (2.85 per match)
- Biggest home win: Lucky Mile 7–1 Fukien
- Biggest away win: Kwok Keung 1–6 Fukien
- Highest scoring: Lucky Mile 6–3 Kwok Keung
- Longest winning run: 6 games Kwun Tong; Lucky Mile
- Longest unbeaten run: 18 games Kwun Tong
- Longest winless run: 15 games Kowloon City; Telecom
- Longest losing run: 8 games Telecom

2012–13 Hong Kong Third Division League is the 62nd season of Hong Kong Third Division League, a football league in Hong Kong.

== Team review ==
The 2012–13 season of the Hong Kong Third Division League consists of 14 clubs, including the 2 teams relegated from 2011–12 Second Division, 3rd placed to 10th placed team of 2011–12 Third 'A' Division and the top 4 teams of 2011–12 Third 'District' Division.

The detail of the clubs is as follows.

Club	League in 2011–12	Position in 2011–12
Eastern District	Third 'District' Division	2nd
Fire Services	Third 'A' Division	3rd
Fu Moon	Third 'A' Division	4th
Fukien	Third 'A' Division	9th
KCDRSC	Third 'A' Division	10th
Kowloon City	Third 'District' Division	4th
Kwai Tsing	Second Division	12th
Kwok Keung	Third 'A' Division	7th
Kwun Tong	Second Division	11th
Lucky Mile	Third 'A' Division	8th
New Fair Kui Tan	Third 'A' Division	5th
Telecom	Third 'A' Division	6th
Tsuen Wan	Third 'District' Division	1st
Wong Tai Sin	Third 'District' Division	3rd

== League table ==
Pos	Team	Pld	W	D	L	GF	GA	GD	Pts	Promotion or relegation
1	Wong Tai Sin (C, P)	26	18	5	3	59	25	+34	59	Promotion to Second Division
2	Lucky Mile (P)	26	18	3	5	66	29	+37	57	Promotion to Second Division
3	Kwun Tong (P)	26	16	6	4	48	25	+23	54	Promotion to Second Division
4	Kwai Tsing (P)	26	13	6	7	53	34	+19	45	Promotion to Second Division
5	New Fair Kui Tan	26	12	6	8	40	25	+15	42	
6	Fire Services	26	9	9	8	38	33	+5	36	
7	Tsuen Wan	26	9	8	9	21	23	−2	35	
8	Fu Moon	26	8	8	10	29	37	−8	32	
9	Eastern District	26	8	7	11	38	36	+2	31	
10	KCDRSC	26	8	3	15	24	47	−23	27	
11	Kowloon City	26	5	7	14	28	50	−22	22	
12	Kwok Keung	26	5	6	15	25	58	−33	21 (Note: KKA 1–0 TEL; TEL 0–3 KKA)	
13	Telecom	26	5	6	15	20	50	−30	21	
14	Fukien (R)	26	4	8	14	28	45	−17	20	Relegation to Fourth Division

Updated to match(es) played on 5 May 2013. Source: hkfa.com
Rules for classification: 1) points; 2) head-to-head points; 3) head-to-head goal difference; 4) head-to-head goals scored; 5) goal difference; 6) number of goals scored.
(C) Champions; (P) Promoted; (R) Relegated

== Results table ==
Home \ Away	EDS	FIR	FUM	FUK	KCD	KLC	KTD	KKA	KTF	LML	NFK	TEL	TWF	WTS
Eastern District		2–2	1–2	1–1	3–2	1–1	2–2	4–0	5–0	1–4	3–2	1–0	1–2	0–3
Fire Services	1–1		1–2	3–0	2–0	4–1	0–1	1–1	2–2	0–3	1–3	2–3	0–0	1–1
Fu Moon	1–0	1–1		1–3	1–0	1–0	0–0	1–5	3–3	1–1	1–2	2–1	1–3	2–2
Fukien	2–0	0–0	2–2		1–5	2–1	0–0	0–0	1–2	1–1	1–1	1–1	0–1	1–2
KCDRSC	0–1	1–1	1–0	2–1		1–2	1–3	1–0	0–4	0–5	0–4	1–1	0–1	0–3
Kowloon City	0–4	2–3	1–1	1–0	3–0		3–3	0–0	0–1	0–4	0–5	1–1	0–0	2–4
Kwai Tsing	5–1	2–3	3–1	4–1	1–3	4–2		5–1	2–2	0–2	3–0	3–0	1–0	2–2
Kwok Keung	0–4	0–2	0–3	1–6	0–1	2–0	2–3		1–0	0–3	1–1	1–0	1–1	0–5
Kwun Tong	1–0	2–0	1–1	2–1	4–1	2–1	2–0	3–0		1–1	1–0	3–0	2–0	0–1
Lucky Mile	2–1	3–1	1–0	7–1	4–1	3–1	3–2	6–3	3–0		1–2	3–0	2–1	0–4
New Fair Kui Tan	1–0	1–2	0–1	1–0	0–1	1–1	1–0	3–0	1–1	3–1		1–2	3–1	2–0
Telecom	1–1	0–2	1–0	2–1	0–2	1–3	0–3	0–3	0–4	2–1	1–1		0–2	1–2
Tsuen Wan	0–0	1–0	1–0	2–0	0–0	0–1	0–1	2–0	0–3	0–2	0–0	1–1		1–1
Wong Tai Sin	1–0	0–3	3–0	2–1	2–0	2–1	2–0	3–3	1–2	3–0	2–1	5–1	3–1	

Updated to match(es) played on 5 May 2013. Source: Third Division League
Legend: Blue = home team win; Yellow = draw; Red = away team win.

== Fixtures and results ==
=== Week 1 ===
8 September 2012	Eastern District	3–2	KCDRSC	Siu Sai Wan, Hong Kong Island
19:30 (GMT+8)	Wong Kwan Chau 2', 23'; Wong Tak Ho (yellow card) 27'; Tsim Kwok Wai (yellow card) 36'	Report	(yellow card) 13' Cheung Wai Kit; (yellow card) 34' (goal) 45', 79' Lee Ka Yee Raymond	Stadium: Siu Sai Wan Sports Ground

9 September 2012	New Fair Kuitan	3–1	Lucky Mile	Ma On Shan, New Territories
13:30 (GMT+8)	Lo Ka Ho 15', 45', 74' (yellow card) 75'	Report	(yellow card) 37' Palatnikov; 62' Paterson; (yellow card) 75' Grainger	Stadium: Ma On Shan Recreation Ground

9 September 2012	Kwun Tong	1–1	Fu Moon	Wong Tai Sin, Kowloon
13:30 (GMT+8)	Yuen Chun Yu 30'	Report	(yellow card) 27' Chau Chun Fung; 52' Ng Ho Nam	Stadium: Po Kong Village Road Park #2

9 September 2012	Kowloon City	1–1	Telecom	Kowloon City, Kowloon
13:30 (GMT+8)	Chan Cho Wai 63'	Report	12' Li Yim Lam; (yellow card) 62' Lai Ka King	Stadium: Kowloon Tsai Sports Ground

9 September 2012	Fukien	0–0	Kwai Tsing	Ma On Shan, New Territories
15:15 (GMT+8)	Chiu Yu Ho (yellow card) 75'	Report		Stadium: Ma On Shan Recreation Ground

9 September 2012	Wong Tai Sin	3–3	Kwok Keung	Wong Tai Sin, Kowloon
15:15 (GMT+8)	Tsui An Yeung 8'; Yeung Kai Yin 18' (pen.); Tam Chi Kit 57'; Tam Ho Ting (yellow card) 62'; Lau Tsz Kin (yellow card) 65'; Pun Tak Hoi (yellow card) 87'	Report	(yellow card) 50' Chan Tsz Chun; 76' Lee Yiu Lun; 78' Mak Ho San; 80' Ko Lui Hang	Stadium: Po Kong Village Road Park #2

9 September 2012	Tsuen Wan	1–0	Fire Services	Tsuen Wan, New Territories
15:15 (GMT+8)	Li Kam Tim 36'; Chan Kon Tat (yellow card) 73'; Man Cheuk Ho (yellow card) 82'	Report	(yellow card) 52' Cheung Ka Lam; (yellow card) 57' Lee Wing Kei	Stadium: Tsuen Wan Riviera Park

=== Week 2 ===
16 September 2012	KCDRSC	1–1	Fire Services	Shing Mun, New Territories
13:30 (GMT+8)	Cheung Chun Ming 30' (pen.)	Report	16' Chung Cho Yiu; (yellow card) 63' How Yiu Pun	Stadium: Shing Mun Valley Sports Ground

16 September 2012	Fukien	2–1	Kowloon City	Tsing Yi, New Territories
13:30 (GMT+8)	Chan Chiu Lung 51'; Lam Chin Fung 80'; Lam Pak Sum (yellow card) 81'	Report	(yellow card) 53' Ho Chung Chu; 66' Lau Hing; (yellow card) 79' Lee Hung Fung	Stadium: Tsing Yi Northeast Park

16 September 2012	Fu Moon	2–2	Wong Tai Sin	Happy Valley, Hong Kong Island
13:30 (GMT+8)	Choi Yan Hon 68'; Fung Chung Ting 86'; Ho Ho Him (yellow card) 89'; Chung Man Ho (yellow card) 90'	Report	59' Lee Kwok Wai; (yellow card) 81' Yeung Kai Yin; (yellow card) 86' Chau Ka Chun; 90' (pen.) Yeung, Kai Yin	Stadium: Happy Valley #6

16 September 2012	Tsuen Wan	0–3	Kwun Tong	Shing Mun, New Territories
15:15 (GMT+8)	Li Kam Tim (yellow card) 70'	Report	34' Yuen Chun Yu; 45' Poon Po Yin; 68' Yau Man Lung	Stadium: Shing Mun Valley Sports Ground

16 September 2012	Kwai Tsing	5–1	Kwok Keung	Tsing Yi, New Territories
15:15 (GMT+8)	Hung King Nam (yellow card) 2'; Chan Tin Lok 14', 82', 89'; Chan Wai Kan 74'; Wong Wai Kit 80' (pen.); Wong Wai Kit (yellow card) 90'	Report	53' Lee Yiu Lun	Stadium: Tsing Yi Northeast Park

16 September 2012	New Fair Kuitan	1–2	Telecom	Happy Valley, Hong Kong Island
15:15 (GMT+8)	Li Chun Yeung (yellow card) 16'; Chow Kam Fung (yellow card) 32'; Lai Kin Sang (yellow card) 69'; Mok Wing Kwai 81'	Report	26', 33' Chang Tai Hin; (yellow card) 55' (yellow-red card) 83' Ng Chun Kwok	Stadium: Happy Valley #6

9 December 2012 Postponed	Lucky Mile	2–1	Eastern District	Happy Valley, Hong Kong Island
13:30 (GMT+8)		Report		Stadium: Hong Kong Football Club Stadium

=== Week 3 ===
23 September 2012	Fukien	1–1	Lucky Mile	Happy Valley, Hong Kong Island
13:30 (GMT+8)	Chan Kin Ho 12'; Lai Yiu Wa (yellow card) 54' (red card) 90'; Lee Cheuk Lam (yellow card) 61'; Tang Wai Ho (yellow card) 88'	Report	90' (pen.) Chow Kay-Ronnie	Stadium: Happy Valley #6

23 September 2012	Kwun Tong	0–1	Wong Tai Sin	Kowloon City, Kowloon
13:30 (GMT+8)	Lee Tat Kong (yellow card) 37'	Report	(yellow card) 37' Wong King Wa; 52' Lau Chi Wai; (yellow card) 90' Yeung Kai Yin	Stadium: Kowloon Tsai Park #1

23 September 2012	Telecom	0–3	Kwai Tsing	Wong Tai Sin, Kowloon
13:30 (GMT+8)	Lai Ming Chung (yellow card) 30'; Kwok Yui Kong (yellow card) 65'; Li Yim Lam (red card) 81'; Chang Tai Hin (red card) 85'	Report	25' (o.g.) Ho Long Kit; 79' Lai Kwok Kwan; 80' Wong Wai Kit	Stadium: Ma Chai Hang Recreation Ground

23 September 2012	New Fair Kuitan	3–1	Tsuen Wan	Happy Valley, Hong Kong Island
15:15 (GMT+8)	Wong Kwok Fai 35'; Yuen Cheuk Fung 80'; Chow Kam Fung (yellow card) 80'; Lo Ka Ho 85'	Report	(yellow card) 70' Yau Tsz Chun; (yellow card) 77' Li Kam Tim; (yellow card) 83' Chung Ho Ting; 86' Chan Kon Tat	Stadium: Happy Valley #6

23 September 2012	Kowloon City	3–0	KCDRSC	Kowloon City, Kowloon
15:15 (GMT+8)	Lau Hing 20', 79'; Ho Chung Chu 46'	Report	(yellow card) 27' (yellow-red card) 64' Yam Ying Kit; (yellow card) 78' Tse Kwai Wah	Stadium: Kowloon Tsai Park #1

23 September 2012	Fu Moon	1–0	Eastern District	Wong Tai Sin, Kowloon
15:15 (GMT+8)	Lai Hon Wai (yellow card) 47'; Wan Chun Fung 77'; Fung Chung Ting (yellow card) 85'	Report	(yellow card) 62' Chan Hiu Fung	Stadium: Ma Chai Hang Recreation Ground

23 September 2012	Fire Services	1–1	Kwok Keung	Kwai Fong, New Territories
15:15 (GMT+8)	Mok Man Pong 56'; Cheung Ka Lam (yellow card) 62'; Chan Chun Wing (yellow card) 69'	Report	28' Ko Lui Hang	Stadium: Kwai Chung Sports Ground

=== Week 4 ===
30 September 2012	Lucky Mile	3–1	Kowloon City	Happy Valley, Hong Kong Island
13:30 (GMT+8)	Chambers 7', 52'; Chow Kay-Ronnie 65'; Palatnikov (yellow card) 73'	Report	72' Hung Chun Chau; (yellow card) 90' Ma Wai Ting	Stadium: Hong Kong Football Club Stadium

30 September 2012	Kwai Tsing	2–2	Wong Tai Sin	Tsing Yi, New Territories
13:30 (GMT+8)	Wong Wai Kit (yellow card) 17'; Chau Pak Hang 29'; Hung King Nam (yellow card) 55'; Lam Woon Tong 80'	Report	27' (yellow card) 71' Wong King Wa; (yellow card) 34' Lau Chi Wai; (yellow card) 70' Ho Kwok Chung; 87' Tam Chi Kit	Stadium: Tsing Yi Northeast Park

30 September 2012	Kwok Keung	1–0	Kwun Tong	Causeway Bay, Hong Kong Island
13:30 (GMT+8)	Choi Tsz Fung 70'; Choi Tsz Fung (yellow card) 79'	Report	(yellow card) 89' Chu Kwok Ho	Stadium: Causeway Bay Sports Ground

30 September 2012	Telecom	2–1	Fukien	Happy Valley, Hong Kong Island
13:30 (GMT+8)	Chan Tsz Chun 28'; Wong Him Chun 47'	Report	38' Chan Kin Ho; (yellow card) 46' Lo Chi Kin; (yellow card) 55' Fong Yip Chi	Stadium: Happy Valley #5

30 September 2012	Eastern District	1–2	Tsuen Wan	Causeway Bay, Hong Kong Island
15:15 (GMT+8)	Wong Tak Ho 32'; Check Po Hong 41'; Lau Kam Wa 49'	Report	2' Mak Yiu Tak; 60' Yiu Chun Kit; (yellow card) 90' Li Kam Tim	Stadium: Causeway Bay Sports Ground

30 September 2012	Fu Moon	1–1	Fire Services	Happy Valley, Hong Kong Island
15:15 (GMT+8)	Leung Kai Hang 49'	Report	(yellow card) 21' Mok Man Pong; (yellow card) 39' Chung Wai Lung Alex; 80' Au Kit Chung	Stadium: Happy Valley #5

30 September 2012	KCDRSC	0–4	New Fair Kuitan	Wong Tai Sin, Kowloon
15:15 (GMT+8)	Yee Sai Yan (yellow card) 42'; Tse Kwai Wah (yellow card) 89'	Report	10' Cheung Ho Lun; (yellow card) 53' Lau Tak Sum; 55', 78' Chow Kam Fung; (yellow card) 58' (goal) 85' Lo Ka Ho; (yellow card) 67' Yuen Cheuk Fung	Stadium: Ma Chai Hang Recreation Ground

=== Week 5 ===
7 October 2012	Kwai Tsing	1–3	KCDRSC	Tsing Yi, New Territories
13:30 (GMT+8)	Yam Ying Kit 56' (o.g.)	Report	7' Leung Chun Hei; (yellow card) 21' Cheung Chun Ming; (yellow card) 47' Lam Hoi Ming; 52' Cheung Ka Wai; 68' Lam Hoi Ming; (yellow card) 85' Cheung Wai Kit	Stadium: Tsing Yi Northeast Park

7 October 2012	Lucky Mile	2–1	Tsuen Wan	Happy Valley, Hong Kong Island
13:30 (GMT+8)	Chow Kay-Ronnie 3'; Cox 16'; Vrijmoed (yellow card) 41'; Jorge (yellow card) 78'	Report	(yellow card) 2' Cheung Man Chung; 27' (pen.) Li Kam Tim; (yellow card) 60' Hui Wai Sang	Stadium: Hong Kong Football Club Stadium

7 October 2012	Kwok Keung	1–6	Fukien	Wong Tai Sin, Kowloon
13:30 (GMT+8)	Lee Yiu Lun 44'; Tse Tsz Hang (yellow card) 68'	Report	11' Chiu Yu Ho; 26' Chan Chiu Lung; 29', 83' Sin Yung Pok; 36', 57' Chan Kin Ho; (yellow card) 85' Lam Pak Sum	Stadium: Ma Chai Hang Recreation Ground

7 October 2012	New Fair Kuitan	1–1	Kwun Tong	Happy Valley, Hong Kong Island
13:30 (GMT+8)	Chow Kam Fung (yellow card) 51'; Chow Chun Wang 79'	Report	22' Lee Tat Kong	Stadium: Happy Valley #5

7 October 2012	Wong Tai Sin	2–1	Kowloon City	Wong Tai Sin, Kowloon
15:15 (GMT+8)	Yeung Kai Yin 26', 85' (pen.) (yellow card) 85'; Pun Tak Hoi (yellow card) 36'; Tam Chi Kit (yellow card) 77'	Report	(yellow card) 21' Ho Chung Chu; (yellow card) 29' (yellow-red card) 81' Ma Wai Ting; 78' Hung Wai Keung; (yellow card) 85' Hung Chun Chau; (yellow card) 87' Lo Sing Wai	Stadium: Ma Chai Hang Recreation Ground

7 October 2012	Eastern District	2–2	Fire Services	Happy Valley, Hong Kong Island
15:15 (GMT+8)	Wong Kwan Chau 31'; Tam Siu Wai 75'	Report	44' Wong Kin Sun Eddie; 80' Chan Chun Wing; (yellow card) 87' Chue Hock Wing	Stadium: Happy Valley #5

7 October 2012	Telecom	1–0	Fu Moon	Kwai Fong, New Territories
15:15 (GMT+8)	Ho Long Kit (yellow card) 45'; Chang Tai Hin 88'; Fan Chun Shing (yellow card) 90'	Report		Stadium: Kwai Chung Sports Ground

=== Week 6 ===
13 October 2012	Eastern District	1–0	Telecom	Siu Sai Wan, Hong Kong Island
19:30(GMT+8)	Chung Kin Wai 21'; Tsang Tsz Hin (yellow card) 35'; Tang Wing Hong Wilson (yellow card) 89'	Report	(yellow card) 35' Kwok Yui Kong; (yellow card) 83' Lai Ming Chung	Stadium: Siu Sai Wan Sports Ground

14 October 2012	Lucky Mile	3–1	Fire Services	Happy Valley, Hong Kong Island
13:30(GMT+8)	Cox 29'; Chambers (yellow card) 31'; Sung Kam Tung (yellow card) 65'; Chow Kay-Ronnie 71' (pen.), 90'	Report	(yellow card) 33' Cheung Ka Lam; (yellow card) 56' Ho Chi Sing; 75' Chow Chun Kit	Stadium: Hong Kong Football Club Stadium

14 October 2012	Wong Tai Sin	3–1	Tsuen Wan	Wong Tai Sin, Kowloon
13:30(GMT+8)	Wong King Wa 10'; Tam Chi Kit (yellow card) 18'; Yeung Kai Yin 42'; Lee Kwok Wai 57'; Chan Chi Kit (yellow card) 71'; Lau Chi Wai (yellow card) 86'	Report	(yellow card) 61' Chan Kon Tat; 72' Mo Yik Hei	Stadium: Po Kong Village Road Park #1

14 October 2012	Kwok Keung	0–3	Fu Moon	Wong Tai Sin, Kowloon
13:30(GMT+8)	Wong Ka Ngo (yellow card) 33'; Tsoi Kwok Yu (yellow card) 79'; Chau Tsz Him (yellow card) 89'	Report	28' Chung Man Ho; 40' Choi Yan Hon; (yellow card) 47' Ng Ho Nam; 56' Ng Ho Nam	Stadium: Po Kong Village Road Park #2

14 October 2012	Kwun Tong	4–1	KCDRSC	Kowloon City, Kowloon
13:30(GMT+8)	Wu Chun Hoi 2'; Kwok Kin Nam 13'; Cheung Chun Ming 29' (o.g.); Leung Man Hin (yellow card) 51'; Yau Man Lung 82'	Report	(yellow card) 34' Cheung Wai Kit; 44' Ngai Kung Yin; (yellow card) 68' Au Chi Wai; (yellow card) 69' Tse Kwai Wah	Stadium: Kowloon Tsai Park #1

14 October 2012	Kowloon City	3–3	Kwai Tsing	Kowloon City, Kowloon
15:15(GMT+8)	Lau Hing 26' (pen.), 31'; Hung Wai Keung 39'; Hung Chun Chau (yellow card) 81'	Report	14' Wong Wai Kit; (red card) 25' Chan Man Ho; 35' Lai Kwok Kwan; (yellow card) 35' Wong Sheung Choi; 46' Chan Tin Lok	Stadium: Kowloon Tsai Park #1

14 October 2012	Fukien	1–1	New Fair Kuitan	Wong Tai Sin, Kowloon
15:15(GMT+8)	Tse Fai (yellow card) 27'; Lam Pak Sum (yellow card) 28'; Chiang Pok Yui (yellow card) 41'; Sin Yung Pok 71' (pen.)	Report	(yellow card) 18' Lai Wai Che; 34' Yuen Cheuk Fung; (red card) 41' Cheung Ho Lun; (yellow card) 66' Yip Wai Chung; (yellow card) 75' Hui Wing Keung; (yellow card) 77' Chau Tak Kit	Stadium: Ma Chai Hang Recreation Ground

=== Week 7 ===
21 October 2012	Kwok Keung	1–1	New Fair Kuitan	Kowloon City, Kowloon
13:30(GMT+8)		Report		Stadium: Kowloon Tsai Park #1

21 October 2012	Fu Moon	1–0	Kowloon City	Wong Tai Sin, Kowloon
13:30(GMT+8)		Report		Stadium: Ma Chai Hang Recreation Ground

21 October 2012	Eastern District	0–3	Wong Tai Sin	Siu Sai Wan, Hong Kong Island
15:15(GMT+8)		Report		Stadium: Siu Sai Wan Sports Ground

21 October 2012	Fukien	0–1	Tsuen Wan	Tsing Yi, New Territories
16:45(GMT+8)		Report		Stadium: Tsing Yi Northeast Park

21 October 2012	Kwai Tsing	0–2	Lucky Mile	Tsing Yi, New Territories
18:30(GMT+8)		Report		Stadium: Tsing Yi Northeast Park

9 December 2012 Rescheduled	KCDRSC	1–1	Telecom	Happy Valley, Hong Kong Island
13:30(GMT+8)		Report		Stadium: Happy Valley #6

9 December 2012 Rescheduled	Fire Services	2–2	Kwun Tong	Happy Valley, Hong Kong Island
15:30(GMT+8)		Report		Stadium: Happy Valley #6

=== Week 8 ===
28 October 2012	Lucky Mile	3–0	Kwun Tong	Happy Valley, Hong Kong Island
13:30(GMT+8)	Page 23'; Cox 28' (yellow card) 59'; Hampshire 35'; Gill (yellow card) 90'	Report	(yellow card) 26' Tsang Man Ching	Stadium: Hong Kong Football Club Stadium

28 October 2012	Wong Tai Sin	2–0	KCDRSC	Wong Tai Sin, Kowloon
13:30(GMT+8)	Tam Chi Kit 22'; Chan Kai Hong (yellow card) 28'; Ho Kwok Chung (yellow card) 63'; Tsui An Yeung 90'	Report	(yellow card) 14' Lai Chi Wai	Stadium: Po Kong Village Road Park #1

28 October 2012	Kowloon City	0–5	New Fair Kuitan	Kowloon City, Kowloon
13:30(GMT+8)		Report		Stadium: Kowloon Tsai Park #1

28 October 2012	Fu Moon	0–0	Kwai Tsing	Tsuen Wan, New Territories
13:30(GMT+8)		Report		Stadium: Shing Mun Valley Sports Ground

28 October 2012	Fire Services	2–3	Telecom	Tsing Yi, New Territories
13:30(GMT+8)		Report		Stadium: Tsing Yi Northeast Park

28 October 2012	Tsuen Wan	2–0	Kwok Keung	Tsuen Wan, New Territories
15:15(GMT+8)		Report		Stadium: Shing Mun Valley Sports Ground

28 October 2012	Fukien	2–0	Eastern District	Tsing Yi, New Territories
15:15(GMT+8)		Report		Stadium: Tsing Yi Northeast Park

=== Week 9 ===
4 November 2012	KCDRSC	0–5	Lucky Mile	Tsing Yi, New Territories
13:30(GMT+8)	Cheung Chun Ming (yellow card) 30'; Lee Ka Yee (yellow card) 76'; Lee Chi Ho (red card) 88'	Report	27', 90' Hampshire; 33' Page; 54' Cox; 81' Vrijmoed	Stadium: Tsing Yi Northeast Park

4 November 2012	Telecom	0–2	Tsuen Wan	Kwai Fong, New Territories
13:30(GMT+8)		Report	2', 30' Lee Chi Wai	Stadium: Kwai Chung Sports Ground

4 November 2012	Fu Moon	1–3	Fukien	So Kon Po, Hong Kong Island
13:30(GMT+8)	Ng Ho Nam 1'; Sham Yiu Yeung (yellow card) 20'; Wan Chun Fung (yellow card) 73'	Report	31', 38' Sin Yung Pok; (yellow card) 55' Chan Ka Choi; (yellow card) 57' Hui Wai Yan; (yellow card) 88' Cheung Wai Hin; 89' Lau Kwan Ming	Stadium: So Kon Po Recreation Ground

4 November 2012	New Fair Kuitan	2–0	Wong Tai Sin	Kwai Fong, New Territories
15:15(GMT+8)	Ng Hoi Shuen (yellow card) 26'; Lo Ka Ho (yellow card) 36' (goal) 58', 73'	Report	(red card) 36' Lau Chi Wai; (yellow card) 72' Lau Tsz Kin; (yellow card) 73' Yeung Kai Yin; (yellow card) 86' Ho Kwok Chung	Stadium: Kwai Chung Sports Ground

4 November 2012	Fire Services	0–1	Kwai Tsing	So Kon Po, Hong Kong Island
15:15(GMT+8)	Ho Chi Sing (yellow card) 32'; Tsui Ming Fung (yellow card) 56'	Report	3' Wong Sheung Choi	Stadium: So Kon Po Recreation Ground

4 November 2012	Kwun Tong	1–0	Eastern District	Sham Shui Po, Kowloon
15:15(GMT+8)	Wu Chun Hoi (yellow card) 17'; Leung Man Hin 73'	Report	(yellow card) 41' Tsim Kwok Wai	Stadium: Tai Hang Tung #2

4 November 2012	Kowloon City	0–0	Kwok Keung	Kowloon City, Kowloon
15:15(GMT+8)		Report		Stadium: Kowloon Tsai Sports Ground

=== Week 10 ===
11 November 2012	Lucky Mile	0–4	Wong Tai Sin	Happy Valley, Hong Kong Island
13:30(GMT+8)		Report		Stadium: Hong Kong Football Club Stadium

11 November 2012	Fire Services	3–0	Fukien	Tsuen Wan, New Territories
13:30(GMT+8)		Report		Stadium: Shing Mun Valley Sports Ground

11 November 2012	Tsuen Wan	1–0	Fu Moon	Tsuen Wan, New Territories
15:15(GMT+8)		Report		Stadium: Shing Mun Valley Sports Ground

11 November 2012	Telecom	0–4	Kwun Tong	Wong Tai Sin, Kowloon
15:15(GMT+8)		Report		Stadium: Po Kong Village Road Park #1

11 November 2012	Eastern District	1–1	Kowloon City	Siu Sai Wan, Hong Kong Island
15:15(GMT+8)		Report		Stadium: Siu Sai Wan Sports Ground

11 November 2012	Kwok Keung	0–1	KCDRSC	Tsing Yi, New Territories
16:45(GMT+8)		Report		Stadium: Tsing Yi Northeast Park

11 November 2012	Kwai Tsing	3–0	New Fair Kuitan	Tsing Yi, New Territories
18:30(GMT+8)		Report		Stadium: Tsing Yi Northeast Park

=== Week 11 ===
18 November 2012	Kwun Tong	2–1	Kowloon City	Wong Tai Sin, Kowloon
13:30(GMT+8)		Report		Stadium: Po Kong Village Road Park #2

18 November 2012	Fire Services	1–3	New Fair Kutian	Tsuen Wan, New Territories
13:30(GMT+8)		Report		Stadium: Tsuen Wan Riviera Park

18 November 2012	Kwai Tsing	5–1	Eastern District	Tsing Yi, New Territories
15:15(GMT+8)		Report		Stadium: Tsing Yi Northeast Park

18 November 2012	Wong Tai Sin	2–1	Fukien	Wong Tai Sin, Kowloon
15:15(GMT+8)		Report		Stadium: Po Kong Village Road Park #2

18 November 2012	Tsuen Wan	0–0	KCDRSC	Tsuen Wan, New Territories
15:15(GMT+8)		Report		Stadium: Tsuen Wan Riviera Park

18 November 2012	Kwok Keung	1–0	Telecom	Kwai Fong, New Territories
15:15(GMT+8)		Report		Stadium: Kwai Chung Sports Ground

13 January 2013 Postponed	Fu Moon	1–1	Lucky Mile	Happy Valley, Hong Kong Island
13:30(GMT+8)		Report		Stadium: Happy Valley #6

=== Week 12 ===
25 November 2012	Kwok Keung	0–4	Eastern District	Wong Tai Sin, Kowloon
13:30 (GMT+8)		Report		Stadium: Po Kong Village Road Park #1

25 November 2012	KCDRSC	2–1	Fukien	Wong Tai Sin, Kowloon
13:30 (GMT+8)		Report		Stadium: Po Kong Village Road Park #2

25 November 2012	Telecom	2–1	Lucky Mile	Tsing Yi, New Territories
13:30(GMT+8)		Report		Stadium: Tsing Yi Northeast Park

25 November 2012	Wong Tai Sin	0–3	Fire Services	Wong Tai Sin, Kowloon
15:15 (GMT+8)		Report		Stadium: Po Kong Village Road Park #1

25 November 2012	Kwun Tong	2–0	Kwai Tsing	Wong Tai Sin, Kowloon
15:15 (GMT+8)		Report		Stadium: Po Kong Village Road Park #2

25 November 2012	New Fair Kuitan	0–1	Fu Moon	Tsing Yi, New Territories
15:15(GMT+8)		Report		Stadium: Tsing Yi Northeast Park

13 January 2013 Postponed	Kowloon City	0–0	Tsuen Wan	Sham Shui Po, Kowloon
15:30(GMT+8)		Report		Stadium: Tai Hang Tung #2

=== Week 13 ===
1 December 2012	Lucky Mile	6–3	Kwok Keung	Happy Valley, Hong Kong Island
19:30 (GMT+8)		Report		Stadium: Hong Kong Football Club Stadium

2 December 2012	Telecom	1–2	Wong Tai Sin	Happy Valley, Hong Kong Island
13:30 (GMT+8)		Report		Stadium: Happy Valley #6

2 December 2012	Fukien	1–2	Kwun Tong	Happy Valley, Hong Kong Island
15:15 (GMT+8)		Report		Stadium: Happy Valley #6

2 December 2012	Kowloon City	2–3	Fire Services	Kowloon City, Kowloon
15:15 (GMT+8)		Report		Stadium: Kowloon Tsai Sports Ground

13 January 2013 Postponed	New Fair Kuitan	1–0	Eastern District	Sham Shui Po, Kowloon
13:30 (GMT+8)		Report		Stadium: Tai Hang Tung #2

20 January 2013 Postponed	KCDRSC	1–0	Fu Moon	Wong Tai Sin, Kowloon
15:30 (GMT+8)		Report		Stadium: Po Kong Village Road Park #2

31 March 2013 Postponed	Tsuen Wan	0–1	Kwai Tsing	Shatin, New Territories
13:30 (GMT+8)		Report		Stadium: Shatin Sports Ground

=== Week 14 ===
27 January 2013	KCDRSC	0–1	Tsuen Wan	Kowloon City, Kowloon
13:30 (GMT+8)		Report		Stadium: Kowloon Tsai Sports Ground

27 January 2013	Telecom	0–3	Kwok Keung	Wong Tai Sin, Kowloon
13:30 (GMT+8)		Report		Stadium: Po Kong Village Road Park #2

27 January 2013	Kowloon City	0–1	Kwun Tong	Kowloon City, Kowloon
15:30 (GMT+8)		Report		Stadium: Kowloon Tsai Sports Ground

27 January 2013	Fukien	1–2	Wong Tai Sin	Wong Tai Sin, Kowloon
15:30 (GMT+8)		Report		Stadium: Po Kong Village Road Park #1

27 January 2013	New Fair Kuitan	1–2	Fire Services	Wong Tai Sin, Kowloon
15:30 (GMT+8)		Report		Stadium: Po Kong Village Road Park #2

27 January 2013	Lucky Mile	1–0	Fu Moon	Happy Valley, Hong Kong Island
16:30 (GMT+8)		Report		Stadium: Hong Kong Football Club Stadium

7 February 2013 Postponed	Eastern District	2–2	Kwai Tsing	Siu Sai Wan, Hong Kong Island
20:15 (GMT+8)		Report		Stadium: Siu Sai Wan Sports Ground

=== Week 15 ===
3 February 2013	New Fair Kuitan	1–0	Kwai Tsing	Tai Po, New Territories
13:30 (GMT+8)		Report		Stadium: Kwong Fuk Park

3 February 2013	Kwun Tong	3–0	Telecom	Sham Shui Po, Kowloon
13:30 (GMT+8)		Report		Stadium: Tai Hang Tung #2

3 February 2013	Fu Moon	1–3	Tsuen Wan	Tsing Yi, New Territories
13:30 (GMT+8)		Report		Stadium: Tsing Yi Northeast Park

3 February 2013	KCDRSC	1–0	Kwok Keung	Tai Po, New Territories
15:30 (GMT+8)		Report		Stadium: Kwong Fuk Park

3 February 2013	Wong Tai Sin	3–0	Lucky Mile	Sham Shui Po, Kowloon
15:30 (GMT+8)		Report		Stadium: Tai Hang Tung #2

3 February 2013	Kowloon City	0–4	Eastern District	Kowloon City, Kowloon
15:30 (GMT+8)		Report		Stadium: Kowloon Tsai Sports Ground

3 February 2013	Fukien	0–0	Fire Services	Shatin, New Territories
15:30 (GMT+8)		Report		Stadium: Shatin Sports Ground

=== Week 16 ===
17 February 2013	Fire Services	4–1	Kowloon City	Ma On Shan, New Territories
13:30 (GMT+8)		Report		Stadium: Ma On Shan Recreation Ground

17 February 2013	Kwun Tong	2–1	Fukien	Tai Po, New Territories
15:30 (GMT+8)		Report		Stadium: Kwong Fuk Park

17 February 2013	Kwai Tsing	1–0	Tsuen Wan	Kwai Fong, New Territories
15:30 (GMT+8)		Report		Stadium: Kwai Chung Sports Ground

17 February 2013	Kwok Keung	0–3	Lucky Mile	Ma On Shan, New Territories
15:30 (GMT+8)		Report		Stadium: Ma On Shan Recreation Ground

17 February 2013	Fu Moon	1–0	KCDRSC	Happy Valley, Hong Kong Island
15:30 (GMT+8)		Report		Stadium: Happy Valley #6

17 February 2013	Eastern District	3–2	New Fair Kuitan	Siu Sai Wan, Hong Kong Island
15:30 (GMT+8)		Report		Stadium: Siu Sai Wan Sports Ground

31 March 2013 Rescheduled	Wong Tai Sin	5–1	Telecom	Tsing Yi, New Territories
15:30 (GMT+8)		Report		Stadium: Tsing Yi Northeast Park

=== Week 17 ===
24 February 2013	Kwun Tong	2–0	Fire Services	Wong Tai Sin, Kowloon
13:30 (GMT+8)		Report		Stadium: Po Kong Village Road Park #2

24 February 2013	New Fair Kuitan	3–0	Kwok Keung	Shing Mun, New Territories
13:30 (GMT+8)		Report		Stadium: Shing Mun Valley Sports Ground

24 February 2013	Telecom	0–2	KCDRSC	Sham Shui Po, Kowloon
15:30 (GMT+8)		Report		Stadium: Tai Hang Tung #2

24 February 2013	Wong Tai Sin	1–0	Eastern District	Wong Tai Sin, Kowloon
15:30 (GMT+8)		Report		Stadium: Po Kong Village Road Park #2

24 February 2013	Tsuen Wan	2–0	Fukien	Shing Mun, New Territories
15:30 (GMT+8)		Report		Stadium: Shing Mun Valley Sports Ground

24 February 2013	Kowloon City	1–1	Fu Moon	Shing Mun, New Territories
15:30 (GMT+8)		Report		Stadium: Shing Mun Valley Sports Ground

1 May 2013 Postponed	Lucky Mile	3–2	Kwai Tsing	Happy Valley, Hong Kong Island
20:30 (GMT+8)		Report		Stadium: Hong Kong Football Club Stadium

=== Week 18 ===
3 March 2013	Fire Services	1–1	Eastern District	Happy Valley, Hong Kong Island
13:30 (GMT+8)		Report		Stadium: Happy Valley #5

3 March 2013	Fu Moon	2–1	Telecom	Causeway Bay, Hong Kong Island
13:30 (GMT+8)		Report		Stadium: Causeway Bay Sports Ground

3 March 2013	Kowloon City	2–4	Wong Tai Sin	Sham Shui Po, Kowloon
13:30 (GMT+8)		Report		Stadium: Tai Hang Tung #2

3 March 2013	KCDRSC	1–3	Kwai Tsing	Causeway Bay, Hong Kong Island
15:30 (GMT+8)		Report		Stadium: Causeway Bay Sports Ground

3 March 2013	Kwun Tong	1–0	New Fair Kuitan	Sham Shui Po, Kowloon
15:30 (GMT+8)		Report		Stadium: Tai Hang Tung #2

3 March 2013	Fukien	0–0	Kwok Keung	Shatin, New Territories
15:30 (GMT+8)		Report		Stadium: Shatin Sports Ground

3 March 2013	Tsuen Wan	0–2	Lucky Mile	Tsing Yi, New Territories
15:30 (GMT+8)		Report		Stadium: Tsing Yi Northeast Park

=== Week 19 ===
9 March 2013	Lucky Mile	7–1	Fukien	Happy Valley, Hong Kong Island
20:30 (GMT+8)		Report		Stadium: Hong Kong Football Club Stadium

10 March 2013	Wong Tai Sin	1–2	Kwun Tong	Wong Tai Sin, Kowloon
13:30 (GMT+8)		Report		Stadium: Po Kong Village Road Park #2

10 March 2013	Kwai Tsing	3–0	Telecom	Tsing Yi, New Territories
13:30 (GMT+8)		Report		Stadium: Tsing Yi Northeast Park

10 March 2013	Tsuen Wan	0–0	New Fair Kuitan	Sham Shui Po, Kowloon
13:30 (GMT+8)		Report		Stadium: Tai Hang Tung #2

10 March 2013	Kwok Keung	0–2	Fire Services	Tsing Yi, New Territories
15:30 (GMT+8)		Report		Stadium: Tsing Yi Northeast Park

10 March 2013	KCDRSC	1–2	Kowloon City	Sham Shui Po, Kowloon
15:30 (GMT+8)		Report		Stadium: Tai Hang Tung #2

10 March 2013	Eastern District	1–2	Fu Moon	Sham Shui Po, Kowloon
15:30 (GMT+8)		Report		Stadium: Tai Hang Tung #2

=== Week 20 ===
17 March 2013	Fu Moon	1–2	New Fair Kuitan	Tai Po, New Territories
13:30 (GMT+8)		Report		Stadium: Kwong Fuk Park

17 March 2013	Fukien	1–5	KCDRSC	Wong Tai Sin, Kowloon
13:30 (GMT+8)		Report		Stadium: Po Kong Village Road Park #2

17 March 2013	Fire Services	1–1	Wong Tai Sin	Wong Tai Sin, Kowloon
15:30 (GMT+8)		Report		Stadium: Po Kong Village Road Park #2

17 March 2013	Kwai Tsing	2–2	Kwun Tong	Tsing Yi, New Territories
15:30 (GMT+8)		Report		Stadium: Tsing Yi Northeast Park

17 March 2013	Tsuen Wan	0–1	Kowloon City	Tai Po, New Territories
15:30 (GMT+8)		Report		Stadium: Kwong Fuk Park

17 March 2013	Eastern District	4–0	Kwok Keung	Happy Valley, Hong Kong Island
15:30 (GMT+8)		Report		Stadium: Happy Valley #5

17 March 2013	Lucky Mile	3–0	Telecom	Happy Valley, Hong Kong Island
16:30 (GMT+8)		Report		Stadium: Hong Kong Football Club Stadium

=== Week 21 ===
24 March 2013	Telecom	1–3	Kowloon City	Tai Po, New Territories
13:30 (GMT+8)		Report		Stadium: Kwong Fuk Park

24 March 2013	Fu Moon	3–3	Kwun Tong	Happy Valley, Hong Kong Island
13:30 (GMT+8)		Report		Stadium: Happy Valley #6

24 March 2013	KCDRSC	0–1	Eastern District	Siu Sai Wan, Hong Kong Island
15:30 (GMT+8)		Report		Stadium: Siu Sai Wan Sports Ground

24 March 2013	Fire Services	0–0	Tsuen Wan	Tai Po, New Territories
15:30 (GMT+8)		Report		Stadium: Kwong Fuk Park

24 March 2013	Kwok Keung	0–5	Wong Tai Sin	Happy Valley, Hong Kong Island
15:30 (GMT+8)		Report		Stadium: Happy Valley #6

24 March 2013	Kwai Tsing	4–1	Fukien	Kwai Fong, New Territories
15:30 (GMT+8)		Report		Stadium: Kwai Chung Sports Ground

24 March 2013	Lucky Mile	1–2	New Fair Kuitan	Happy Valley, Hong Kong Island
16:30 (GMT+8)		Report		Stadium: Hong Kong Football Club Stadium

=== Week 22 ===
7 April 2013	New Fair Kuitan	0–1	KCDRSC	Shing Mun, New Territories
13:30 (GMT+8)		Report		Stadium: Shing Mun Valley Sports Ground

7 April 2013	Fukien	1–1	Telecom	Tai Po, New Territories
13:30 (GMT+8)		Report		Stadium: Kwong Fuk Park

7 April 2013	Fire Services	1–2	Fu Moon	Happy Valley, Hong Kong Island
13:30 (GMT+8)		Report		Stadium: Happy Valley #5

7 April 2013	Kowloon City	0–4	Lucky Mile	Sham Shui Po, Kowloon
13:30 (GMT+8)		Report		Stadium: Tai Hang Tung #2

7 April 2013	Wong Tai Sin	2–0	Kwai Tsing	Happy Valley, Hong Kong Island
15:30 (GMT+8)		Report		Stadium: Happy Valley #5

7 April 2013	Kwun Tong	3–0	Kwok Keung	Sham Shui Po, Kowloon
15:30 (GMT+8)		Report		Stadium: Tai Hang Tung #2

7 April 2013	Tsuen Wan	0–0	Eastern District	Shing Mun, New Territories
15:30 (GMT+8)		Report		Stadium: Shing Mun Valley Sports Ground

=== Week 23 ===
14 April 2013	Kwok Keung	1–1	Tsuen Wan	Tsuen Wan, New Territories
13:30 (GMT+8)		Report		Stadium: Tsuen Wan Riviera Park

14 April 2013	New Fair Kuitan	1–1	Kowloon City	Tsing Yi, New Territories
13:30 (GMT+8)		Report		Stadium: Tsing Yi Northeast Park

14 April 2013	Kwun Tong	1–1	Lucky Mile	Wong Tai Sin, Kowloon
13:30 (GMT+8)		Report		Stadium: Po Kong Village Road Park #1

14 April 2013	Telecom	0–2	Fire Services	Tsuen Wan, New Territories
15:30 (GMT+8)		Report		Stadium: Tsuen Wan Riviera Park

14 April 2013	Kwai Tsing	3–1	Fu Moon	Tsing Yi, New Territories
15:30 (GMT+8)		Report		Stadium: Tsing Yi Northeast Park

14 April 2013	Eastern District	1–1	Fukien	Siu Sai Wan, Hong Kong Island
15:30 (GMT+8)		Report		Stadium: Siu Sai Wan Sports Ground

14 April 2013	KCDRSC	0–3	Wong Tai Sin	Wong Tai Sin, Kowloon
15:30 (GMT+8)		Report		Stadium: Po Kong Village Road Park #1

=== Week 24 ===
21 April 2013	Fire Services	0–3	Lucky Mile	Happy Valley, Hong Kong Island
13:30 (GMT+8)		Report		Stadium: Happy Valley #6

21 April 2013	Telecom	1–1	Eastern District	Wong Tai Sin, Kowloon
13:30 (GMT+8)		Report		Stadium: Po Kong Village Road Park #2

21 April 2013	Tsuen Wan	1–1	Wong Tai Sin	Tsuen Wan, New Territories
13:30 (GMT+8)		Report		Stadium: Tsuen Wan Riviera Park

21 April 2013	Fu Moon	1–5	Kwok Keung	Happy Valley, Hong Kong Island
15:30 (GMT+8)		Report		Stadium: Happy Valley #5

21 April 2013	New Fair Kuitan	1–0	Fukien	Sham Shui Po, Kowloon
15:30 (GMT+8)		Report		Stadium: Tai Hang Tung #2

21 April 2013	Kwai Tsing	4–2	Kowloon City	Tsing Yi, New Territories
15:30 (GMT+8)		Report		Stadium: Tsing Yi Northeast Park

21 April 2013	KCDRSC	0–4	Kwun Tong	Wong Tai Sin, Kowloon
15:30 (GMT+8)		Report		Stadium: Po Kong Village Road Park #2

=== Week 25 ===
28 April 2013	Fire Services	2–0	KCDRSC	Happy Valley, Hong Kong Island
15:30 (GMT+8)		Report		Stadium: Happy Valley #5

28 April 2013	Kwok Keung	2–3	Kwai Tsing	Tai Po, New Territories
15:30 (GMT+8)		Report		Stadium: Kwong Fuk Park

28 April 2013	Wong Tai Sin	3–0	Fu Moon	Wong Tai Sin, Kowloon
15:30 (GMT+8)		Report		Stadium: Po Kong Village Road Park #2

28 April 2013	Kowloon City	1–0	Fukien	Kowloon City, Kowloon
15:30 (GMT+8)		Report		Stadium: Kowloon Tsai Sports Ground

28 April 2013	Kwun Tong	2–0	Tsuen Wan	Sham Shui Po, Kowloon
15:30 (GMT+8)		Report		Stadium: Tai Hang Tung #2

28 April 2013	Telecom	1–1	New Fair Kuitan	Kwai Fong, New Territories
15:30 (GMT+8)		Report		Stadium: Kwai Chung Sports Ground

28 April 2013 Rescheduled	Lucky Mile	4–1	Eastern District	Happy Valley, Hong Kong Island
18:00 (GMT+8)		Report		Stadium: Hong Kong Football Club Stadium

=== Week 26 ===
5 May 2013	Kwok Keung	2–0	Kowloon City	Tsuen Wan, New Territories
16:00 (GMT+8)		Report		Stadium: Tsuen Wan Riviera Park

5 May 2013	Kwai Tsing	2–3	Fire Services	Tsing Yi, New Territories
16:00 (GMT+8)		Report		Stadium: Tsing Yi Northeast Park

5 May 2013	Fukien	2–2	Fu Moon	Happy Valley, Hong Kong Island
16:00 (GMT+8)		Report		Stadium: Happy Valley #5

5 May 2013	Eastern District	5–0	Kwun Tong	Happy Valley, Hong Kong Island
16:00 (GMT+8)		Report		Stadium: Happy Valley #6

5 May 2013	Wong Tai Sin	2–1	New Fair Kuitan	Tai Po, New Territories
16:00 (GMT+8)		Report		Stadium: Kwong Fuk Park

5 May 2013	Tsuen Wan	1–1	Telecom	Shing Mun, New Territories
16:00 (GMT+8)		Report		Stadium: Shing Mun Valley Sports Ground

5 May 2013	Lucky Mile	4–1	KCDRSC	Happy Valley, Hong Kong Island
16:30 (GMT+8)		Report		Stadium: Hong Kong Football Club Stadium
