= 2025–26 Hong Kong Second Division League =

Hong Kong Second Division
- Season: 2025–26
- Champions: Kui Tan
- Promoted: Kui Tan; Leaper
- Relegated: Mutual
- Matches: 176
- Goals: 667 (3.79 per match)
- Top goalscorer: Hui Wang Fung (Kui Tan) (22 goals)
- Biggest home win: Tuen Mun 20–1 Fu Moon (14 December 2025)
- Biggest away win: Fu Moon 1–10 Kwai Tsing (16 November 2025); Fu Moon 1–10 Wan Chai (30 November 2025)
- Highest scoring: Tuen Mun 20–1 Fu Moon (14 December 2025)
- Longest winning run: 22 matches Kui Tan
- Longest unbeaten run: 22 matches Kui Tan
- Longest winless run: 16 matches Mutual
- Longest losing run: 17 matches Mutual

The 2025–26 Hong Kong Second Division League is the 12th season of the Hong Kong Second Division since it became the third-tier football league in Hong Kong in 2014–15. The season began on 7 September 2025 and ended on 31 May 2026.

== Overview ==
The Hong Kong Second Division League expanded to 16 teams for this season.

== Teams ==
=== Changes from last season ===
==== From Second Division ====
===== Promoted to First Division =====
- Tung Sing
- Supreme FC
- Kwun Tong
- Lucky Mile

==== To Second Division ====
===== Promoted from Third Division =====
- Kui Tan
- Gospel
- Sui Tung
- Kowloon Cricket Club
- Fukien
- Wan Chai

== League table ==
Pos	Team	Pld	W	D	L	GF	GA	GD	Pts	Promotion or relegation
1	Kui Tan	15	14	1	0	67	5	+62	43	Qualification for the Championship round
2	Leaper	15	10	4	1	42	12	+30	34	Qualification for the Championship round
3	Sui Tung	15	10	3	2	27	14	+13	33	Qualification for the Championship round
4	Kwai Tsing	15	9	3	3	35	20	+15	30	Qualification for the Championship round
5	Wing Yee	15	9	3	3	34	17	+17	30	Qualification for the Championship round
6	Wan Chai	15	9	0	6	37	21	+16	27	Qualification for the Championship round
7	Yau Tsim Mong	15	7	1	7	24	28	−4	22	Qualification for the Championship round
8	Gospel	15	7	1	7	26	27	−1	22	Qualification for the Championship round
9	Fukien	15	5	6	4	18	17	+1	21	Qualification for the Relegation round
10	Wong Tai Sin	15	4	8	3	19	16	+3	20	Qualification for the Relegation round
11	Kwong Wah	15	5	1	9	20	43	−23	16	Qualification for the Relegation round
12	Kowloon Cricket Club	15	4	2	9	25	25	0	14	Qualification for the Relegation round
13	Tuen Mun	15	4	0	11	41	33	+8	12	Qualification for the Relegation round
14	Tsuen Wan	15	1	3	11	12	37	−25	6	Qualification for the Relegation round
15	Mutual	15	1	2	12	8	34	−26	5	Qualification for the Relegation round
16	Fu Moon	15	1	2	12	11	97	−86	5	Qualification for the Relegation round

Updated to match(es) played on 8 February 2026. Source: Hong Kong Football Association
Rules for classification: 1) Points; 2) Head-to-head points; 3) Head-to-head goal difference; 4) Head-to-head goals scored; 5) Goal difference; 6) Goals scored; 7) Fair-play points; 8) Drawing lots

== Championship round ==
Pos	Team	Pld	W	D	L	GF	GA	GD	Pts	Promotion or relegation
1	Kui Tan (C, P)	22	22	0	0	93	11	+82	66	Promotion to the First Division
2	Leaper (P)	22	14	4	4	55	24	+31	46	Promotion to the First Division
3	Sui Tung	22	13	4	5	41	26	+15	43	
4	Wan Chai	22	13	0	9	52	32	+20	39	
5	Kwai Tsing	22	11	5	6	45	35	+10	38	
6	Gospel	22	11	1	10	44	40	+4	34 (Note: Gospel win head-to-head against Wing yee)	
7	Wing Yee	22	10	4	8	47	38	+9	34	
8	Yau Tsim Mong	22	8	1	13	33	52	−19	25	

Updated to match(es) played on 24 May 2026. Source: Hong Kong Football Association
Rules for classification: 1) Points; 2) Head-to-head points; 3) Head-to-head goal difference; 4) Head-to-head goals scored; 5) Goal difference; 6) Goals scored; 7) Fair-play points; 8) Drawing lots
(C) Champions; (P) Promoted

== Relegation round ==
Pos	Team	Pld	W	D	L	GF	GA	GD	Pts	Promotion or relegation
1	Wong Tai Sin	22	9	8	5	35	26	+9	35	
2	Fukien (W)	22	6	9	7	23	26	−3	27	Withdrew from league system
3	Kowloon Cricket Club	22	7	5	10	38	31	+7	26	
4	Fu Moon	22	7	3	12	33	101	−68	24	
5	Kwong Wah	22	7	1	14	28	69	−41	22	
6	Tuen Mun	22	7	0	15	56	49	+7	21	
7	Tsuen Wan	22	4	4	14	30	51	−21	16	
8	Mutual (R)	22	1	3	18	14	56	−42	6	Relegation to the Third Division

Updated to match(es) played on 31 May 2026. Source: Hong Kong Football Association
Rules for classification: 1) Points; 2) Head-to-head points; 3) Head-to-head goal difference; 4) Head-to-head goals scored; 5) Goal difference; 6) Goals scored; 7) Fair-play points; 8) Drawing lots
(R) Relegated; (W) Withdrew
