= 2019–20 Hong Kong Second Division League =

Hong Kong Second Division
- Season: 2019–20
- Champions: N/A (season abandoned)
- Matches played: 90
- Goals scored: 294 (3.27 per match)
- Top goalscorer: Wong Sheung Choi (Double Flower) (12 goals)
- Biggest home win: St. Joseph's 5–0 Sparta Asia (8 December 2019); Double Flower 5–0 Tuen Mun (12 January 2020)
- Biggest away win: Yau Tsim Mong 0–8 Double Flower (22 December 2019)
- Highest scoring: Double Flower 4–4 Fu Moon (29 September 2019); Fu Moon 1–7 Kowloon City (27 October 2019); Yau Tsim Mong 0–8 Double Flower (22 December 2019)
- Longest winning run: 6 matches St. Joseph's
- Longest unbeaten run: 12 matches St. Joseph's; Double Flower
- Longest winless run: 11 matches Sparta Asia
- Longest losing run: 5 matches Yau Tsim Mong; Sparta Asia

The 2019–20 Hong Kong Second Division League was the 6th season of the Hong Kong Second Division since it became the third-tier football league in Hong Kong in 2014–15. The season began on 15 September 2019 and ended on 16 April 2020 when the Hong Kong Football Association announced the cancellation of all lower division seasons due to the 2020 coronavirus pandemic in Hong Kong.

== Teams ==
=== Changes from last season ===
==== From Second Division ====
===== Promoted to First Division =====
- North District
- Sham Shui Po

===== Relegated to Third Division =====
- Qiyi Hanstti
- Sun Hei

==== To Second Division ====
===== Relegated from First Division =====
- Double Flower
- Mutual

===== Promoted from Third Division =====
- CFCSSHK
- Kwai Tsing

==== Name Changes ====
- Mutual renamed as Sparta Asia

== League table ==
Pos	Team	Pld	W	D	L	GF	GA	GD	Pts
1	Kowloon City	13	9	3	1	33	14	+19	30
2	St. Joseph's	13	9	2	2	25	9	+16	29
3	Double Flower	13	8	4	1	43	15	+28	28
4	Kwong Wah	12	6	2	4	26	17	+9	20
5	Tung Sing	13	6	1	6	20	20	0	19
6	Wan Chai	13	5	3	5	22	22	0	18
7	Kwai Tsing	13	4	5	4	18	16	+2	17
8	Kwun Tong	13	4	4	5	19	23	−4	16
9	Fu Moon	13	4	3	6	20	31	−11	15
10	CFCSSHK	12	3	4	5	15	20	−5	13
11	Tuen Mun	13	4	1	8	13	21	−8	13
12	Lucky Mile	11	3	3	5	16	22	−6	12
13	Sparta Asia	13	2	3	8	13	27	−14	9
14	Yau Tsim Mong	13	2	2	9	8	34	−26	8

Updated to match(es) played on 22 January 2020. Source: Hong Kong Football Association
Rules for classification: 1) Points; 2) Head-to-head points; 3) Head-to-head goal difference; 4) Head-to-head goals scored; 5) Goal difference; 6) Goals scored; 7) Fair-play points; 8) Drawing lots
