= 2020–21 Hong Kong Second Division League =

Hong Kong Second Division
- Season: 2020–21
- Champions: Tung Sing
- Promoted: None
- Relegated: None
- Matches played: 91
- Goals scored: 314 (3.45 per match)
- Top goalscorer: Pang Chung Hin (Tung Sing); 9 goals
- Biggest home win: Tung Sing 5–0 Lucky Mile (13 June 2021); Tung Sing 5–0 Kwai Tsing (20 June 2021)
- Biggest away win: Mutual 2–6 Lucky Mile (30 May 2021)
- Highest scoring: Lucky Mile 5–4 Kwong Wah (21 March 20221)
- Longest winning run: 5 matches Kwong Wah
- Longest unbeaten run: 9 matches Kwong Wah
- Longest winless run: 8 matches Yau Tsim Mong
- Longest losing run: 8 matches Yau Tsim Mong

The 2020–21 Hong Kong Second Division League was the 7th season of the Hong Kong Second Division since it became the third-tier football league in Hong Kong in 2014–15. The season began on 29 November 2020.

== Effects of the COVID-19 pandemic ==
Due to the forced cancellation of the 2019–20 season, there were no teams promoted to the First Division and no teams relegated to the Third Division this season.

== League table ==
Pos	Team	Pld	W	D	L	GF	GA	GD	Pts
1	Tung Sing (C)	13	9	1	3	33	10	+23	28
2	Kwun Tong	13	8	2	3	22	14	+8	26
3	Kwong Wah	13	7	4	2	26	21	+5	25 (Note: Kwong Wah wins head-to-head against Double Flower)
4	Double Flower	13	8	1	4	30	26	+4	25
5	Wan Chai	13	6	3	4	18	22	−4	21
6	St. Joseph's	13	6	2	5	27	21	+6	20
7	Lucky Mile	13	5	3	5	30	28	+2	18
8	Kwai Tsing	13	5	3	5	14	18	−4	18
9	Tuen Mun	13	5	2	6	21	19	+2	17
10	Kowloon City	13	4	4	5	22	21	+1	16
11	Mutual	13	3	5	5	19	30	−11	14
12	Fu Moon	13	3	4	6	24	25	−1	13
13	CFCSSHK	13	2	4	7	14	22	−8	10
14	Yau Tsim Mong	13	1	0	12	14	37	−23	3

Updated to match(es) played on 20 June 2021. Source: Hong Kong Football Association
Rules for classification: 1) Points; 2) Head-to-head points; 3) Head-to-head goal difference; 4) Head-to-head goals scored; 5) Goal difference; 6) Goals scored; 7) Fair-play points; 8) Drawing lots
(C) Champions
