= 2026–27 Hong Kong First Division League =

Hong Kong First Division
- Season: 2026–27
- Matches: 53
- Goals: 193 (3.64 per match)
- Top goalscorer: Giovane (Central & Western) (11 goals)
- Biggest home win: Yuen Long 6–0 Kui Tan (13 September 2026)
- Biggest away win: Bright Cerulean 1–10 Resources Capital (27 September 2026); Sky Leader 0–9 Resources Capital (18 October 2026)
- Highest scoring: Bright Cerulean 1–10 Resources Capital (27 September 2026)
- Longest winning run: South China (5 matches)
- Longest unbeaten run: Yuen Long; Resources Capital (7 matches)
- Longest winless run: Lucky Mile (7 matches)
- Longest losing run: Lucky Mile; Bright Cerulean (4 matches)

The 2026–27 Hong Kong First Division League is the 13th season of Hong Kong First Division since it became the second-tier football league in Hong Kong in 2014–15. The season began on 6 September 2026.

== Teams ==
=== Changes from last season ===
==== From First Division ====
===== Promoted to the Premier League =====
- Sha Tin

==== To First Division ====
===== Promoted from the Second Division =====
- Kui Tan
- Leaper

== League table ==
Pos	Team	Pld	W	D	L	GF	GA	GD	Pts	Promotion or relegation
1	Yuen Long	7	6	1	0	23	5	+18	19	Promotion to the Premier League
2	Resources Capital	7	5	2	0	37	8	+29	17	Promotion to the Premier League
3	Harmony	8	5	2	1	17	8	+9	17	
4	South China	8	5	1	2	10	5	+5	16	
5	Citizen	8	4	2	2	11	11	0	14	
6	Tung Sing	8	4	1	3	10	8	+2	13	
7	Hoi King	8	3	3	2	14	14	0	12	
8	Central & Western	7	4	0	3	23	12	+11	12	
9	Sky Leader	8	2	1	5	8	24	−16	7	
10	Sham Shui Po	8	2	1	5	8	14	−6	7	
11	Bright Cerulean	7	2	0	5	7	25	−18	6	
12	Lucky Mile	8	1	1	6	10	22	−12	4	
13	Kui Tan	8	1	1	6	9	27	−18	4	Relegation to the Second Division
14	Leaper	6	0	2	4	6	10	−4	2	Relegation to the Second Division

Updated to match(es) played on 25 October 2026. Source: Hong Kong Football Association
Rules for classification: 1) Points; 2) Head-to-head points; 3) Head-to-head goal difference; 4) Head-to-head goals scored; 5) Goal difference; 6) Goals scored; 7) Fair-play points; 8) Drawing lots
