= Jerome De Clarens =

French footballer (born 1989)

Jerome de Clarens
Personal information
- Full name: Jerome Marie Thibault Stephanie de Clarens
- Date of birth: 12 May 1989 (age 37)
- Place of birth: Paris, France
- Height: 1.83 m (6 ft 0 in)
- Position: Midfielder

Youth career
- Poissy

Senior career*
Years	Team	Apps	(Gls)
2008–2010	Manosque		
2010–2011	Concarneau		
2011–2012	Sisteron		
2012	Manosque		
2013–2015	Kwai Tsing	18	(7)
2015	Happy Valley	11	(3)
2015	Wanchai	6	(0)
2015–2018	Hong Kong FC	35	(13)
- * Club domestic league appearances and goals

Jerome Marie Thibault Stephanie de Clarens (born 12 May 1989) is a French former professional footballer who played as a midfielder.

== Career ==
De Clarens moved to Hong Kong in December 2012, having played football at semi-professional level in his native France. He went on trial with First Division side Kwai Tsing, and was immediately signed, becoming the first French player in the club's history.

Following two successful seasons with Kwai Tsing, De Clarens signed for Hong Kong FC, and helped them gain promotion to the Hong Kong Premier League.
