= 2026–27 Hong Kong Third Division League =

Hong Kong Third Division
- Season: 2026–27
- Matches: 62
- Goals: 227 (3.66 per match)
- Top goalscorer: Chan Ho Fung (Citylinkers SkyWolf); Raj Kshetri (Ravia); Chan Hung Yiu (Tuen Mun FC) (7 goals)
- Biggest home win: Ornament 7–0 ERSA (18 October 2026)
- Biggest away win: Kong Kit 8–1 ERSA (6 September 2026)
- Highest scoring: Kong Kit 2–7 Konter (25 October 2026); Kong Kit 8–1 ERSA (6 September 2026)
- Longest winning run: 4 matches KCDRSC
- Longest unbeaten run: 8 matches Tuen Mun FC
- Longest winless run: 6 matches Mutual
- Longest losing run: 5 matches ERSA

The 2026–27 Hong Kong Third Division League is the 13th season of Hong Kong Third Division since it became the fourth-tier football league in Hong Kong in 2014–15. The season began on 6 September 2026.

== Teams ==
=== Changes from last season ===
==== From Third Division ====
===== Promoted to Second Division =====
- Sun Hei
- Double Flower
- Tsun Tat

===== Eliminated from league =====
- Chandler Lambert

==== To Third Division ====
===== Relegated from Second Division =====
- Mutual

===== New Clubs =====
- ERSA
- Soar FC
- United Kingdom Football Academy

== League table ==
Pos	Team	Pld	W	D	L	GF	GA	GD	Pts	Promotion or relegation
1	Tuen Mun FC	8	6	2	0	16	6	+10	20	Promotion to Second Division
2	KCDRSC	8	6	1	1	22	9	+13	19	Promotion to Second Division
3	Konter	8	6	0	2	30	11	+19	18	
4	Islands	8	5	1	2	15	8	+7	16	
5	Orion	7	4	1	2	18	13	+5	13	
6	Kong Kit	8	4	1	3	21	15	+6	13	
7	CityLinkers SW	8	4	1	3	15	14	+1	13	
8	St. Joseph's	7	4	0	3	18	13	+5	12	
9	Qi Yi	8	3	1	4	11	11	0	10	
10	Ornament	7	3	0	4	15	8	+7	9	
11	Sai Kung	7	3	0	4	9	9	0	9	
12	UKFA	8	2	2	4	10	15	−5	8	
13	Ravia	8	2	1	5	11	20	−9	7	
14	Soar FC	8	2	0	6	5	21	−16	6	
15	Mutual	8	1	1	6	7	22	−15	4	
16	ERSA	8	1	0	7	4	32	−28	3	Elimination from League System

Updated to match(es) played on unknown. Source: Kong Football Association
