= Po Kong Village Road Park =

Park in Diamond Hill, Hong Kong

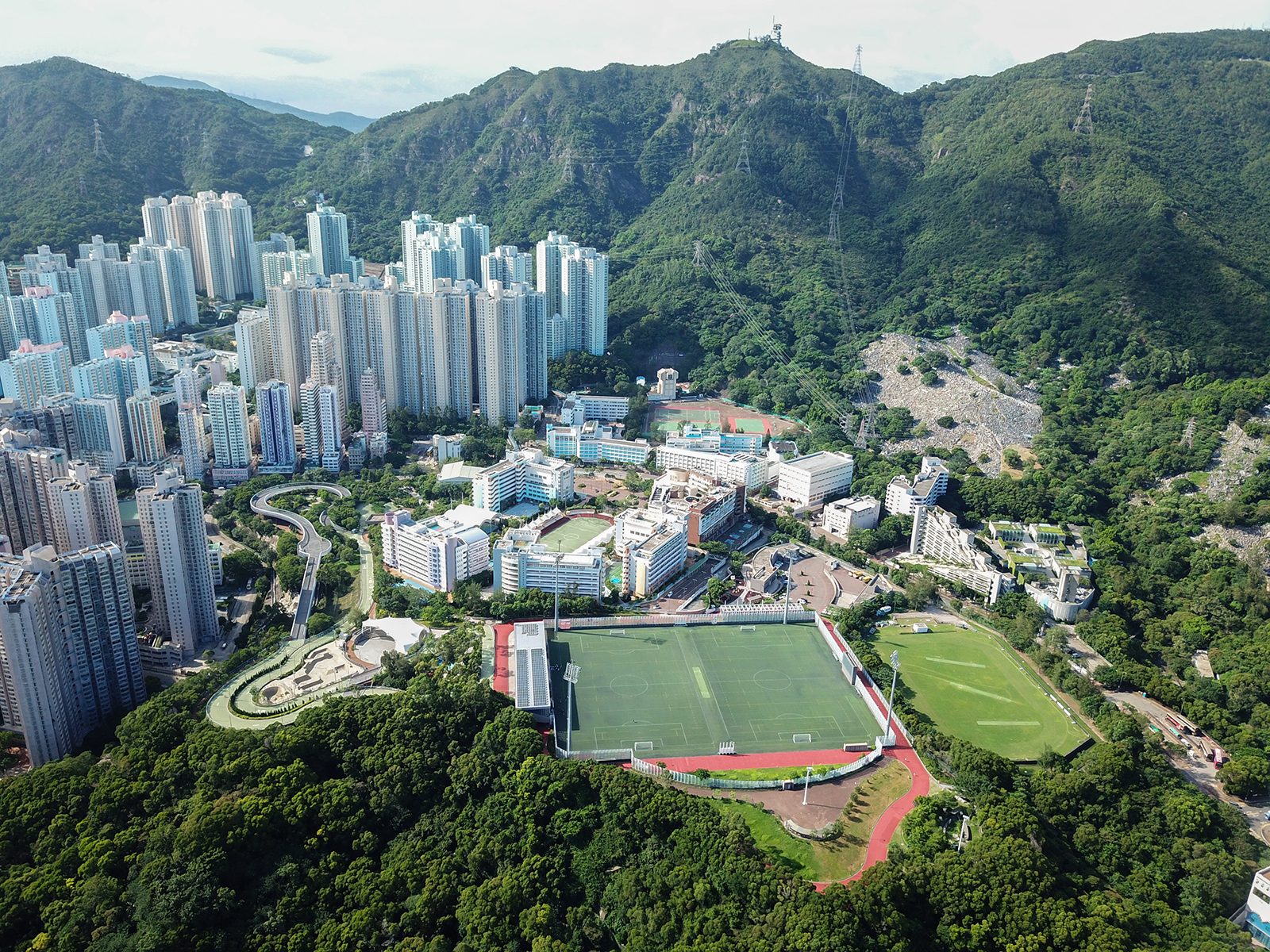
- Interactive map of Po Kong Village Road Park
- Location: 140 Po Kong Village Road, Diamond Hill, Hong Kong
- Coordinates: 22.3435999°N 114.2023673°E
- Owner: Leisure and Cultural Services Department
- Operator: Leisure and Cultural Services Department
- Capacity: 1,000
- Surface: Artificial turf
- Pitch size: 100 x 64 m

Construction
- Opened: September 2010; 15 years ago

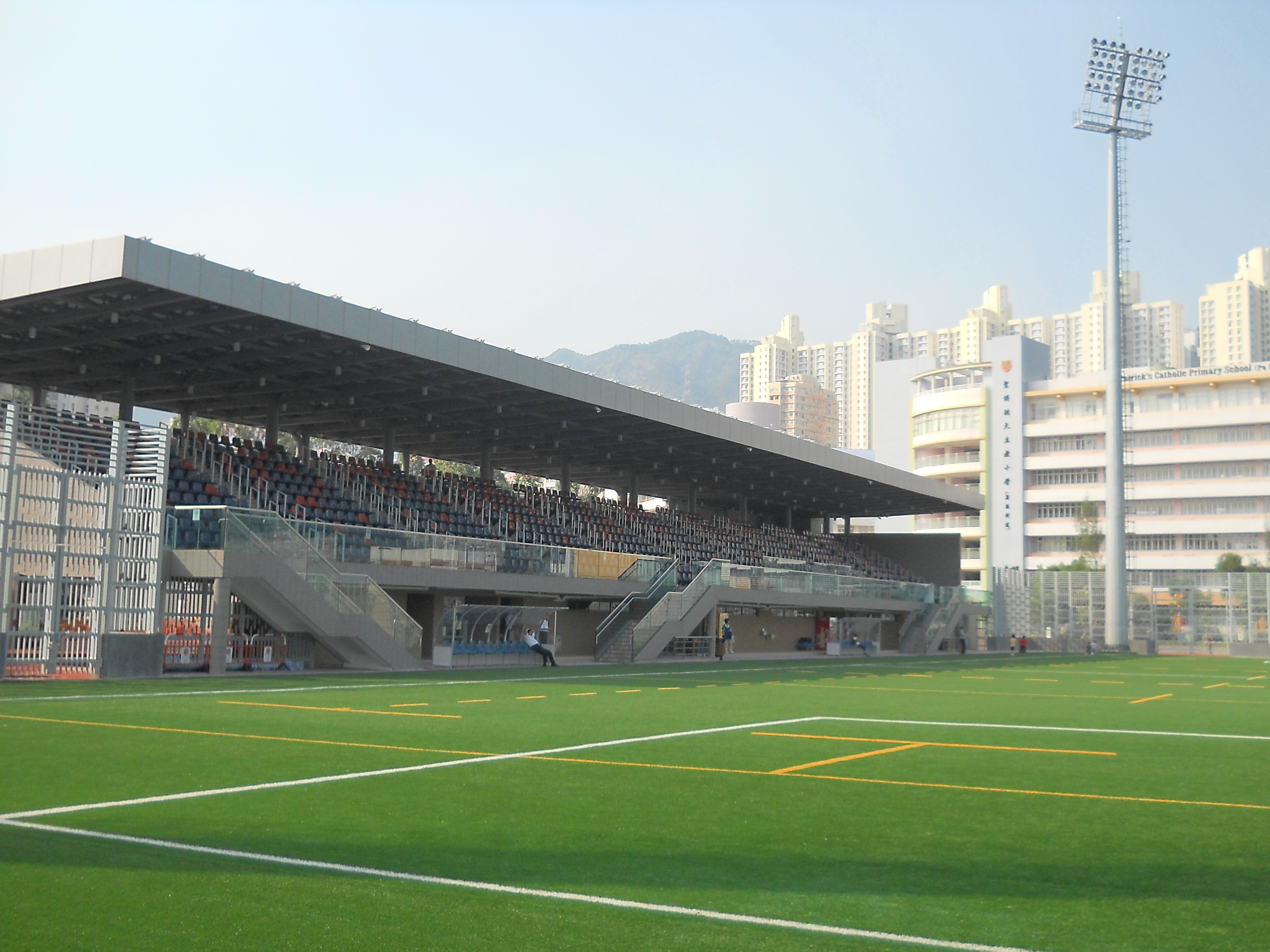
Football pitch #1

Po Kong Village Road Park (Chinese: 蒲崗村道公園) is a sports ground located in Diamond Hill, Hong Kong. The footprint of the park covers 9 hectares and contains various amenities including football pitches, a 1 km cycling track, an amphitheatre and a car park.

The park is open 24 hours a day.

== Football ==
The two pitches inside the park are frequently rented by various Hong Kong football clubs representing various levels of the Hong Kong pyramid. A 1,000 seat grandstand is located on the west side of the pitches with men's and ladies' change rooms and toilets within. The stand is open daily from 7:30 a.m. to 10:00 p.m.

== Facilities ==
- Two 11 a side football/rugby pitches
- Two cricket field nets
- 650m jogging track
- Two cycling areas (one elevated track, one beginner's park)
- Skate park
- Two fitness stations
- Two elderly fitness corners
- Children's playground
- Renewable energy zone
- 45 car park

== Gallery ==
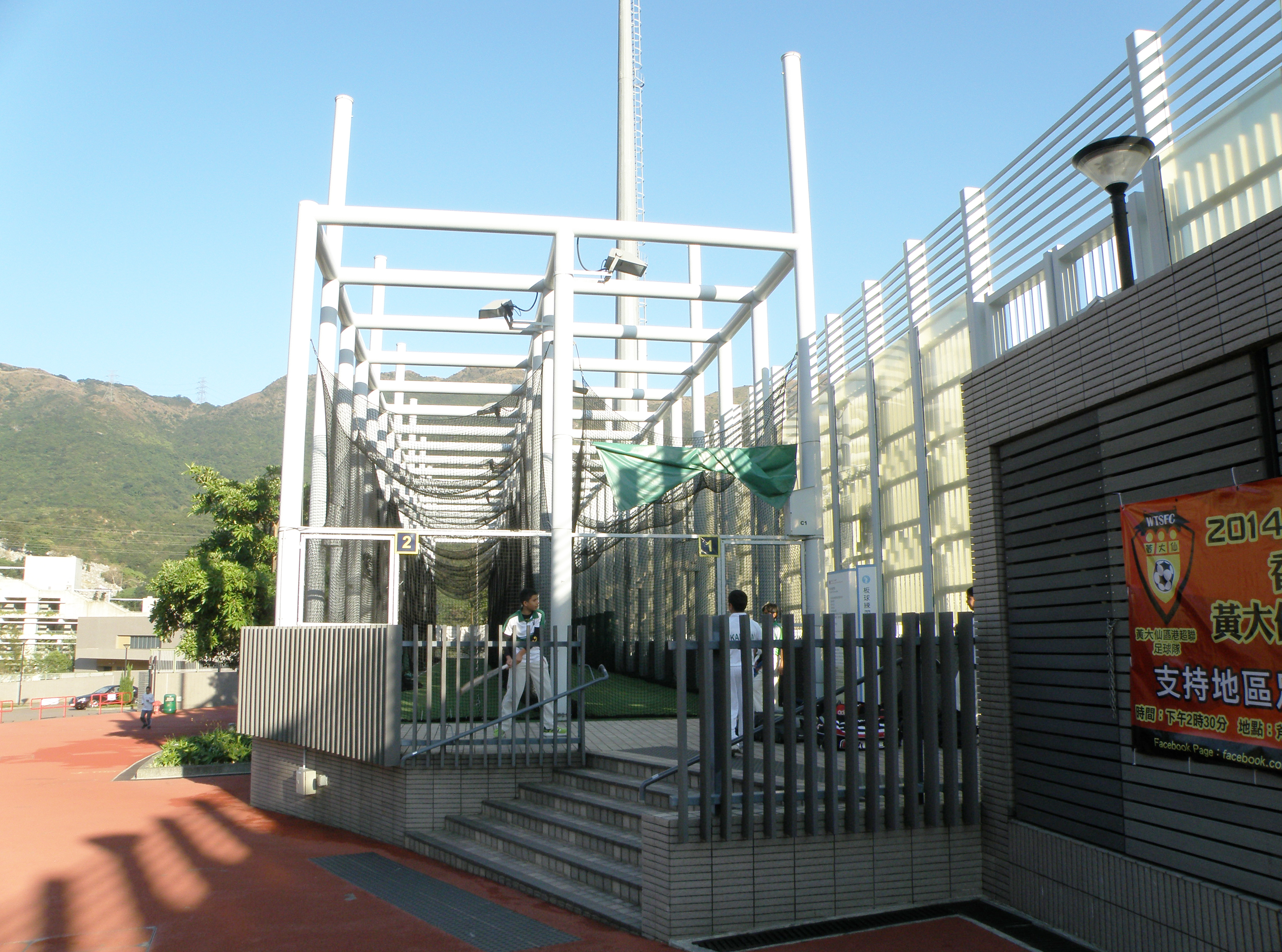
Cricket practice field

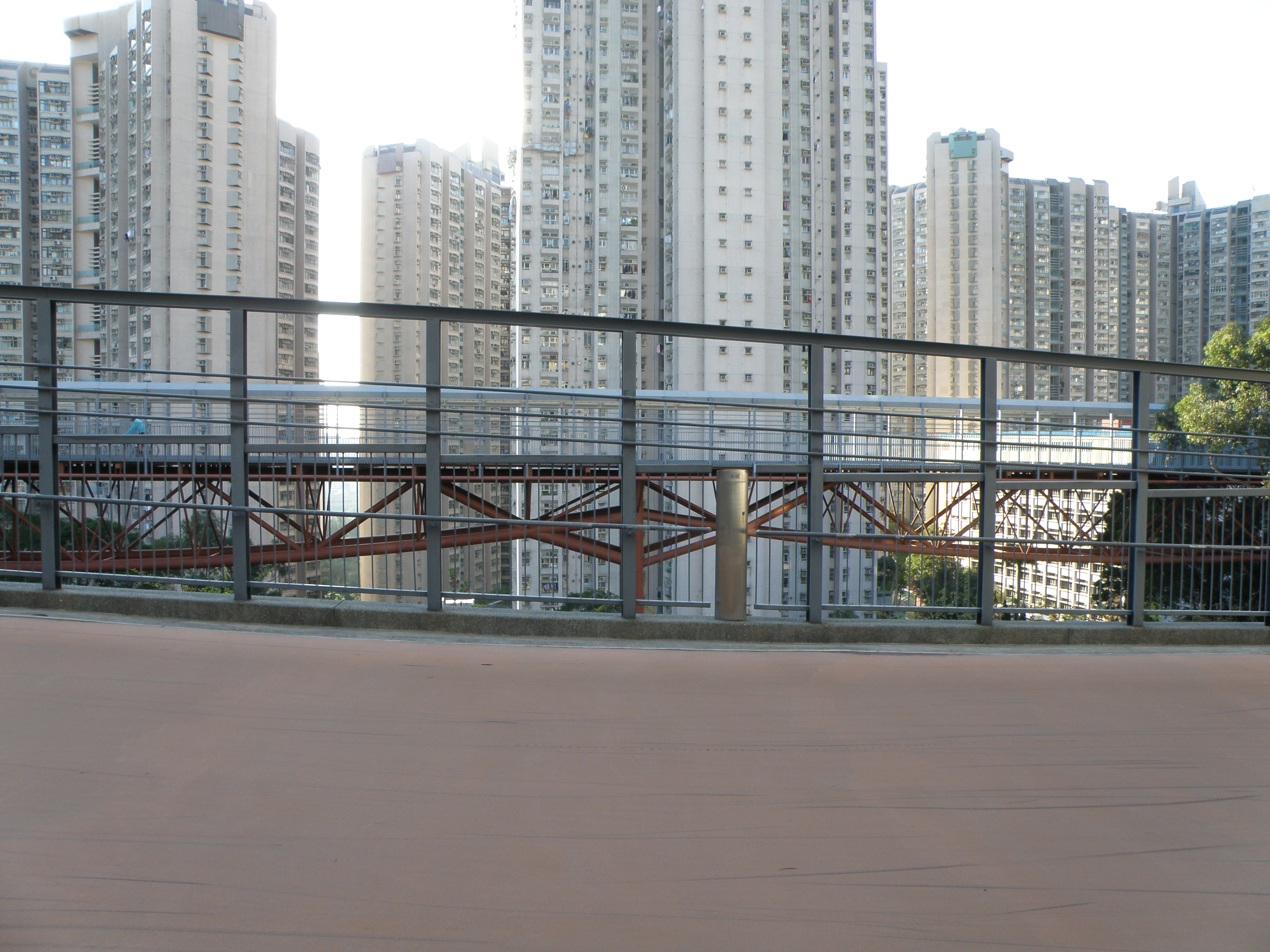
Segregated cycle facilities

== See also ==
- San Po Kong
