= Wong Tai Sin DRSC =

Wong Tai Sin
- Full name: Wong Tai Sin District Recreation & Sports Council
- Nickname: The Templemen
- Founded: 1979; 47 years ago
- Ground: Po Kong Village Road Park
- Capacity: 1,500
- President: Chow Ching Lam
- Manager: Lo Chi Fung
- League: Hong Kong Second Division
- 2025–26: Second Division, 9th of 16
- Website: https://www.hkfa.com/en/club/54/detail/
Home colours	Away colours

Wong Tai Sin District Recreation & Sports Council (Chinese: 黃大仙區康樂體育會, abbreviated as WTS DRSC, also known as Wong Tai Sin) is a Hong Kong football club which currently plays in the Hong Kong Second Division League. It is operated by Wong Tai Sin District Council.

== History ==
Founded in 1979, Wong Tai Sin joined the Third Division League in 1980s. In 1990, due to the expansion of Second Division League, the club was being promoted to the second-tier division.

In their first Second Division season, the club placed second in the league table, meaning they had gained promotion to the First Division for the first time in club history. However, they refused to promote eventually, and remained in the Second Division.

The club was relegated to the Third Division after spending nine seasons in the second-tier division in the 1998–99 season, as they placed 10th out of eleven teams.

In the 2013–14 season, the club finished 2nd in the Hong Kong Second Division League and gained promotion to the newly established Hong Kong Premier League. This became the club's first-ever appearance in the top-flight league of Hong Kong.

In the 2015–16 season, the club was branded as Glory Sky Wong Tai Sin. However, the club was relegated from the HKPL after finishing 9th in the season.

The club came close to winning the 2016–17 Hong Kong First Division title, coming within one point short of catching champions Sun Hei.

== Honours ==
=== League ===
- Hong Kong Third Division
  - Champions (1): 2012–13
