= Metro Gallery F.C. =

Leaper
- Full name: Metro Gallery Football Club
- Founded: 2008; 18 years ago (as Fourway Athletics)
- Ground: Po Kong Village Road Park
- Capacity: 1,500
- League: Hong Kong First Division
- 2025–26: Second Division, 2nd of 16 (promoted)
- Website: www.hkfa.com/en/club/142/detail/
Home colours	Away colours

Metro Gallery Football Club (Chinese: 駿其足球會) is a Hong Kong football club which currently competes in the Hong Kong First Division.

== History ==
The team began as Fourway Athletics (Chinese: 四海體育會), it joined Hong Kong First Division in 2008–09 season as a competition member (Chinese: 競賽會員, members who pay a specific amount of money and sponsor a domestic cup of Hong Kong to the Hong Kong Football Association, to join the Hong Kong First Division League) of the Hong Kong Football Association.

In 2009–10 season, Fourway merged with Rangers in the Hong Kong Second Division and was renamed as Fourway Rangers (Chinese: 四海流浪) for the new season.

In 2011–12 season, the team was renamed Biu Chun Rangers in deference to club sponsor Biu Chun Watches.

In 2012–13 season, the team was renamed as Yokohama FC Hong Kong as J. League Division 2 team Yokohama F.C. purchased the Hong Kong Football Association membership of the team.

In the 2013–14 season, Yokohama FC Hong Kong moved their home ground from Siu Sai Wan Sports Ground to Tseung Kwan O Sports Ground, finishing a disappointing 10th in the league.

For the 2014–15 season, the club attained sponsorship from Modic Entertainment and was thus renamed as YFCMD (Yokohama FC Modic). The team also once again moved stadiums to Sham Shui Po Sports Ground.

In summer 2015, Modic Entertainment confirmed they will not extend the sponsorship contract with the club. Metro Gallery confirmed that they will attain the sponsorship. The team was then branded as Dreams Metro Gallery FC.

On 6 July 2016, the club announced via Facebook that they would not field a team in the 2016–17 season, instead, choosing to voluntarily drop down to the First Division. The South China Morning Post reported that the team was facing financial difficulties after failing to attain sponsorship for the Premier League.

In the 2017–18 season, the club was branded as Hongda Metro Gallery. The next season, the club was branded as Hongda.

In the 2019–20 season, the club was branded as Icanfield.

In the 2022–23 season, the club was branded as Leaper MG, and was relegated to the Second Division.

In the 2023–24 season, the club was renamed as Leaper FC.

== Name history ==
- 2008–2009: Fourway Athletics (四海體育會)
- 2009–2011: Fourway Rangers (四海流浪)
- 2011–2012: Biu Chun Rangers (標準流浪)
- 2012–2014: Yokohama FC Hong Kong (橫濱FC(香港))
- 2014–2015: YFCMD (YFC澳滌)
- 2015–2016: Dreams Metro Gallery (夢想駿其)
- 2016–2017: Metro Gallery (駿其)
- 2017–2018: Hongda Metro Gallery (宏大駿其)
- 2018: Hongda (宏大)
- 2019: Metro Gallery (駿其)
- 2019–2020: Icanfield (駿棹)
- 2020–2022: Metro Gallery (駿其)
- 2022–2023: Leaper MG (騰翱MG)
- 2023–: Leaper (騰翱)
