= Kwong Wah AA =

Hong Kong football club

Kwong Wah
- Full name: Kwong Wah Athletic Association
- Founded: 1936
- League: Hong Kong Second Division
- 2025–26: Second Division, 13th of 16
| Home colours | Away colours |

Kwong Wah Athletic Association (Chinese: 光華康體會) are a football club that currently plays in the Hong Kong Second Division.

The team's home matches are played throughout Hong Kong.

== History ==
Kwong Wah were formed in 1936 by a group of coworkers at CLP Group. Among them, there were local and foreign players including future star Hau Yung Seng. The year after their formation, they won the 1937–38 Hong Kong Junior Shield as well as promotion into the Hong Kong Second Division.

The club reached the Hong Kong First Division in 1947. For two for their first three seasons in the top flight, Kwong Wah finished at the bottom of the table but because there was no relegation during that time, they remained.

In the early 1950s, Kwong Wah were sponsored by Shanghai businessmen including Xu Wenkui. They signed a number of Shanghai-based players to help the squad such as Zhang Jinhai, Wu Qixiang, Chen Mingzhe, Luo Shoufu, and Yan Shixin.

During their 18-year stay in the First Division, their highest table finish was fourth place achieved during the 1963–64 season. The club won one trophy over that run, capturing the 1962–63 Hong Kong Senior Shield over South China. Alas, a last place finish in the 1965–66 doomed the club for relegation.

Kwong Wah would spend the next seven seasons in the Second Division until a runners up finish during the 1972–73 season helped the club to achieve promotion back into the First Division. They were led at that time by former Criminal Investigation Department director Yan Hung who purchased star keeper Ho Yung Hing the following season to strengthen the squad. Their stay lasted four seasons until the club finished second bottom of the table in 1976–77 and were relegated once again.

In 1990–91, the club finished second bottom in the Second Division and were relegated to the Hong Kong Third A Division.

Due to a merger of the two Third Division leagues by the Hong Kong Football Association, Kwong Wah began the 2012–13 season in the Hong Kong Fourth Division. Thanks to a third-place finish, they were able to gain promotion back into the Third Division after just one season.

The club finished 10th in the 2016–17 season, narrowly escaping relegation to the Third Division based on winning the head-to-head tiebreaker against Kwok Keung.

In 2026–27 season, the club has renamed as P.B Alliance.

== Honours ==
=== Cup ===
- Hong Kong Senior Shield
  - Champions (1): 1962–63
- Hong Kong Junior Shield
  - Champions (1): 1937–38
