= Hong Kong Second Division League =

Men's association football league in Hong Kong

- Founded: 1909
- Country: Hong Kong
- Confederation: AFC
- Number of clubs: 16 (2025–26)
- Level on pyramid: 3 (2014–); 2 (1909–2014)
- Promotion to: Hong Kong First Division
- Relegation to: Hong Kong Third Division
- Domestic cup: FA Cup Junior Division
- Current champions: Kui Tan (1st title) (2025–26)
- Most championships: HKFC (13 titles)
- Website: www.hkfa.com/en/
- Current: 2026–27 Hong Kong Second Division

Hong Kong Second Division League (Chinese: 香港乙組聯賽) is the third level of football league in Hong Kong founded in 1909. The top two teams are promoted to the Hong Kong First Division.

== Competition format ==
- The teams play single round robin. After each team has played every team once, the table is split into a Championship Group for the top eight teams and a Challenging Group for the bottom seven. The teams then play another single round robin within their respective groups.
- The bottom two teams are relegated to the Hong Kong Third Division.

== Past winners ==
=== Before World War II ===
Season	Champions	1st Runner-up	2nd Runner-up
1909–10	88th Co., R.G.A.		
1910–11	88th Co., R.G.A.		
1911–12	83rd Co., R.G.A.		
1912–13	88th Co., R.G.A.		
1913–14	88th Co., R.G.A.		
1914–15	St. Joseph's F.C.		
1915–16	88th Co., R.G.A.		
1916–17	4th K.O.S.L.I.		
1917–18	South China		
1918–19	St. Joseph's F.C.	Staff and Departments	
1919–20	Royal Navy Force		
1920–21	St. Joseph's F.C.		
1921–22	HMS Titania		
1922–23	King's Own Regiment		
1923–24	HMS Titania		
1924–25	Club de Recreio		
1925–26	South China		
1926–27	K.O.S.B.		
1927–28	K.O.S.B.	St. Joseph's	
1928–29	Royal Navy Force		
1929–30	Chinese AA		
1930–31	South Welsh Borderers		
1931–32	South Welsh Borderers		
1932–33	Chinese AA		
1933–34	South China		
1934–35	Lincolnshire Regiment		
1935–36	Royal Navy Force	Eastern Lancashire Regiment	Royal Welch Fusiliers
1936–37	Royal Navy Force		
1937–38	Middlesex Regiment		
1938–39			
1939–40	South China		
1940–41	Royal Engineers		

=== After World War II ===
Season	Champions	1st Runner-up	2nd Runner-up
1946–47	Sing Tao		
1947–48	Eastern	Sing Tao	
1948–49	Chinese AA	K.M.B.	
1949–50	News Vendors	Kitchee	Army
1950–51	Kitchee	K.M.B.	South China
1951–52	South China	Kitchee	Chinese AA
1952–53	South China	Chinese AA	China Gymnastics Assn.
1953–54	K.M.B.	South China	Taikoo Chinese
1954–55	K.M.B.	Chinese AA	Little Sai Wan
1955–56	K.M.B.	Kitchee	Jardine
1956–57	Jardine	Little Sai Wan	Tung Wah
1957–58	Little Sai Wan	Navy	Caroline Hill
1958–59	Happy Valley	C.M.B.	R.E.M.E.
1959–60	Caroline Hill	Little Sai Wan	Aux. Fire Services
1960–61	Five-One-Seven	Yuen Long	Tung Sing
1961–62	Tung Sing	R.A.F.	B & S
1962–63	Caroline Hill	Army	R.A.F.
1963–64	Tung Sing	Sing Tao	Rangers
1964–65	Rangers	Jardine	HKFC
1965–66	Army	HKFC	Telephones
1966–67	Telephones	Fire Services	Customs
1967–68	Jardine	Caroline Hill	HKFC
1968–69	Fire Services	HKFC	
1969–70	Happy Valley	Army	Caroline Hill
1970–71	Tsuen Wan	Caroline Hill	Mackinnons
1971–72	Seiko	Mackinnons	HKFC
1972–73	HKFC	Kwong Wah	Urban Services Dept
1973–74	Jardine	Urban Services Dept	Sing Tao
1974–75	Police	HKFC	K.M.B.
1975–76	K.M.B.	Sea Bee	Jardine
1976–77	HKFC	Blake Garden	Police
1977–78	Police	Kui Tan	Tsuen Wan
1978–79	HKFC	Bulova	Tsuen Wan
1979–80	Police	Tsuen Wan	Po Chai Pills
1980–81	Po Chai Pills	Rangers	Ryoden
1981–82	Ryoden	Morning Star	Police
1982–83	Police	Zindabad	HKFC
1983–84	Police	Tsuen Wan	Harps
1984–85	HK Electric	HKFC	Double Flower
1985–86	HKFC	Police	Sing Tao
1986–87	Sing Tao	Po Chai Pills	May Ching
1987–88	HKFC	Tin Tin	Police
1988–89	Po Chai Pills	HKFC	Martini
1989–90	Martini	May Ching	Fukien
1990–91	Police	Wong Tai Sin	Sun Hei
1991–92	Kitchee	British Forces	Wong Tai Sin
1992–93	HKFC	Rangers	Police
1993–94	Frankwell	Mansion	Police
1994–95	HKFC	Mansion	Fire Services
1995–96	Tung Po	Kui Tan	Five-One-Seven
1996–97	Yee Hope	HKFC	Five-One-Seven
1997–98	HKFC	Sai Kung's Friend	China Fortune
1998–99	HKFC	Fire Services	Kitchee
1999–2000	Tung Po	HKFC	Fukien
2000–01	HKFC	Fukien	Fire Services
2001–02	Fukien	Tung Po	Mutual
2002–03	Kitchee	Fire Services	Mutual
2003–04	Citizen	Hong Kong 08	Mutual
2004–05	HKFC	Mutual	Lucky Mile
2005–06	HKFC	Tai Po	Tung Po
2006–07	Tung Po	Shek Kip Mei	Fukien
2007–08	Mutual	HKFC	Fukien
2008–09	Shatin	Advance Tai Chung	HKFC
2009–10	HKFC	Tuen Mun	Double Flower
2010–11	Sham Shui Po	Pontic	Double Flower
2011–12	Rangers	Southern	HKFC
2012–13	Yuen Long	Happy Valley	Eastern
2013–14	Tai Po	Wong Tai Sin	HKFC

=== As a 3rd Tier League ===
Season	Champions	1st Runner-up	2nd Runner-up
2014–15	Wing Yee	Sparta Rotterdam Mutual	Kowloon City
2015–16	Tung Sing	Eastern District	Sparta Rotterdam Mutual
2016–17	Sparta Rotterdam Mutual	Hoi King	Central & Western
2017–18	Happy Valley	Central & Western	Tuen Mun
2018–19	North District	Sham Shui Po	Kwun Tong
2019–20	Abandoned due to COVID-19 pandemic in Hong Kong		
2020–21	Tung Sing	Kwun Tong	Kwong Wah
2021–22	Abandoned due to COVID-19 pandemic in Hong Kong		
2022–23	3 Sing	Sai Kung	Wing Go
2023–24	WSE	Tuen Mun	Leaper
2024–25	Tung Sing	Supreme FC	Kwun Tong
2025–26	Kui Tan	Leaper	Sui Tung

== See also ==
- The Hong Kong Football Association
