= Kwai Tsing District FA =

Kwai Tsing
- Full name: Kwai Tsing District FA
- Founded: 2002
- Ground: Tsing Yi Northeast Park
- Chairman: Lau Yat Nam
- Manager: Law Ka Lok
- League: Hong Kong Second Division
- 2025–26: Second Division, 5th of 16
- Website: https://www.facebook.com/kwaitsingfootballteam/
Home colours	Away colours

Kwai Tsing District Football Association (Chinese: 葵青區足球會) is a Hong Kong football club which currently competes in the Hong Kong Second Division.

The club's home matches are played at Tsing Yi Northeast Park.

== History ==
In the 2022–23 season, the HKFA accepted Kwai Tsing's application to be promoted to the Hong Kong First Division. However, the club finished bottom of the league and was relegated back to the Hong Kong Second Division.
