= Football in Hong Kong =

- Country: Hong Kong
- Governing body: Football Association of Hong Kong, China
- National teams: Men's; Women's
- Clubs: 50+ clubs in 4 leagues

National competitions
- Men's competition: FIFA World Cup; AFC Asian Cup; EAFF E-1 Football Championship; Women's competition: FIFA Women's World Cup; AFC Women's Asian Cup; EAFF E-1 Football Championship

Club competitions
- League: Men's competition: Hong Kong Premier League; Hong Kong First Division League; Hong Kong Second Division League; Hong Kong Third Division League; Women's competition: Hong Kong Women's League First Division; Hong Kong Women's League Second Division; Hong Kong Women's League Third Division; Cups: Men's competition: Hong Kong FA Cup; HKFA League Cup; Hong Kong Senior Shield; Hong Kong FA Cup Junior Division; Women's competition: Women's FA Cup

International competitions
- Men's competition: AFC Champions League Two; Women's competition: FIFA Women's Club World Cup; FIFA Women's Champions Cup; AFC Women's Champions League

Association football is the most popular sport in Hong Kong, followed by rugby union. The Football Association of Hong Kong, China (HKFA) is the governing body for football in Hong Kong.

== History ==
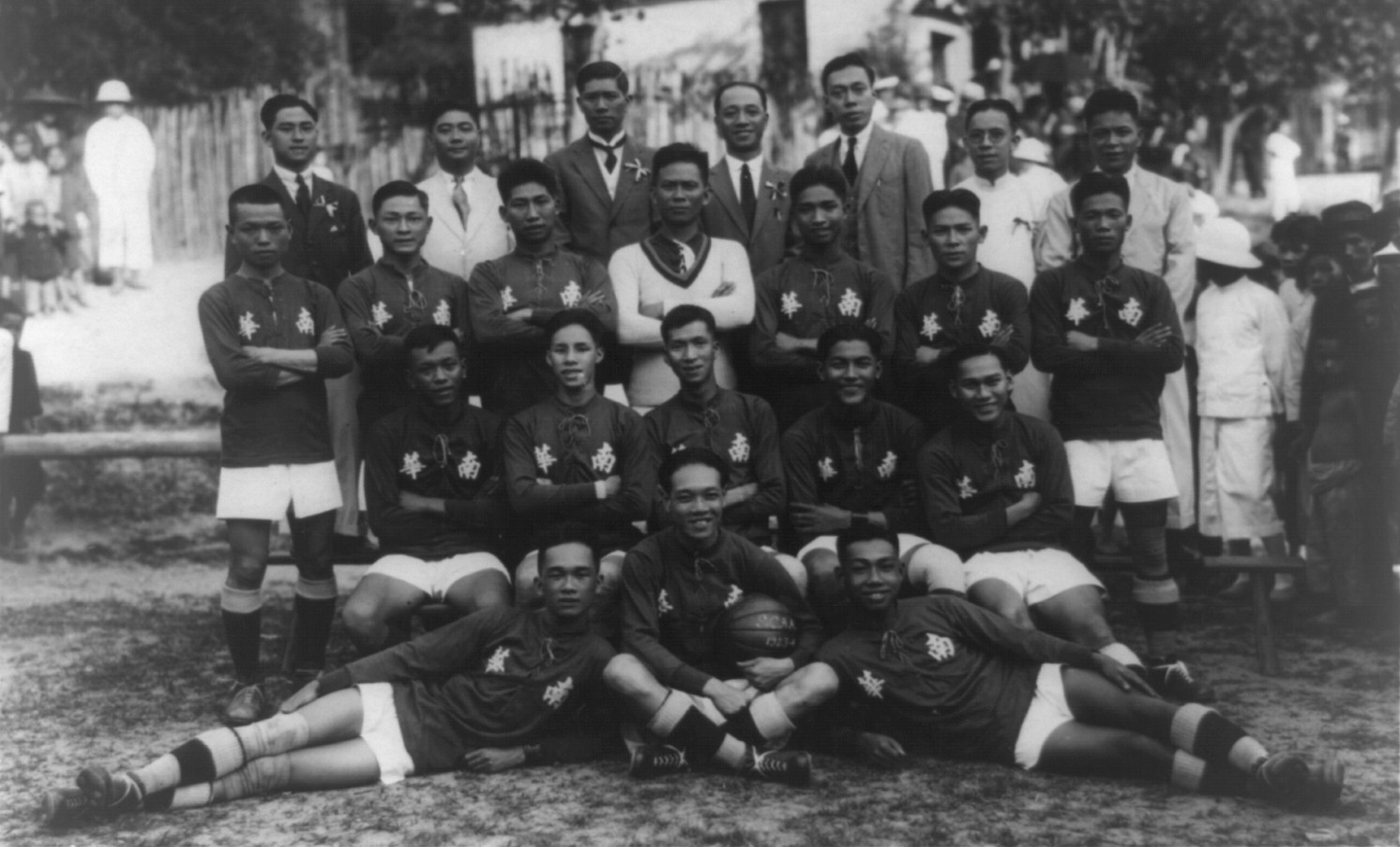
The South China AA football team in 1923 or 1924

The first football club of Hong Kong is Hong Kong Football Club, usually known as "The Club", founded in 1886. The club is one of the oldest existing football clubs in Asia. The first football competition of Hong Kong is the Challenge Shield, which founded in 1898. Its format is similar to the FA Challenge Cup in England. Tracing back to early 20th century, the Hong Kong football league was founded in 1908.

Hong Kong was the first in Asia to organise a professional club.

The Hong Kong Football Association, the governing body of Hong Kong football, was founded in 1914 and is one of the oldest football associations in Asia.

Within the Asia context, Hong Kong was a comparative powerhouse from the 1920s to the 1970s.

The Hong Kong team competed in China's first national games and won the national games championships in 1935 and 1948.

In the 1970s and 1980s, football in Hong Kong was strong and popular, with competitive local teams boosted by well known overseas players and managers, playing in front crowds of tens of thousands. In 1985, in a famous match, Hong Kong upset China 2–1 in Beijing to move towards a place in the 1986 World Cup. The team ultimately fell short of qualification.

In recent years, major attempts have been made by Hong Kong government to improve both HKFA’s governance and the quality of Hong Kong football under a government scheme called ‘Project Phoenix’.

== League system ==
All the football leagues are organised by the HKFA.

=== Premier League ===
The Hong Kong Premier League began its first season in 2014–15. It is the top flight professional league in Hong Kong with 11 teams competing.

=== Lower Divisions ===
The lower divisions consist of the First Division (D1 League), the Second Division (D2 League), and the Third Division (D3 League). Most lower-division clubs are amateurs, but semi-professional teams can also play there. The bottom team of the Third Division League will be eliminated from the system.

==== 2026–27 season ====
Level	Total clubs (57)	League(s) / division(s)
1	11	Hong Kong Premier League; 11 clubs – 1 relegation
2	14	Hong Kong First Division League; 14 clubs – 1 promotion, 1 relegation
3	16	Hong Kong Second Division League; 16 clubs – 2 promotions, 2 relegations
4	16	Hong Kong Third Division League; 16 clubs – 2 promotions, 1 disaffiliation

== Cup competitions ==
All the cup competitions are also organised by the HKFA. There are several cup competitions for clubs at different levels of the football pyramid. The oldest cup competition is the Senior Shield, with the winners of the FA Cup qualifying for the group stage of AFC Champions League Two.

- The FA Cup, established in 1974, is Hong Kong's major cup competition. The winners of the FA Cup receive a group stage spot in the AFC Champions League Two.
- The Senior Shield, established in 1896, is the oldest football knockout inter-club competition in Asia.
- The League Cup (2000–2009, 2010–2012, 2014–2016, 2025–) is a football competition contested by clubs in the Hong Kong Premier League. The cup had been abolished several times before being relaunched in a new format for the 2025–26 season, which has no limitation on foreign players.
- The FA Cup Junior Division, established in 2013, is a cup competition for clubs playing in levels 2–4 of the football pyramid. Between 2013 and 2016, the competition was designed as a preliminary round to allow lower division clubs to qualify for the FA Cup. In 2016, after the HKFA decided not to allow lower division clubs to compete in the tournament proper anymore, it was then renamed to FA Cup Junior Division.

There have also been several cup competitions that are no longer running:

- The Viceroy Cup (1969–1998) was the first football competition in Hong Kong which allowed business sponsorship.
- The Community Shield (2009–2010) was a single match played each August between the champions and first runners-up of the previous season's First Division League.
- The Junior Shield, established in 1922, was a cup competition for clubs playing in levels 2–4 of the football pyramid. It was abandoned in 2013.
- The Community Cup (2014–2018) was a single match played each September between the champions of the Hong Kong Premier League and the champions of the FA Cup.
- The HKPLC Cup (2023–2024), established in 2023, was a cup competition played during the period when the Hong Kong national football team was preparing for the 2023 AFC Asian Cup.
- The Sapling Cup (2015–2025), established in 2015, was a cup competition designed to provide young players in the top flight with more first-team minutes. Each club was obligated to have a minimum of three players under the age of 22, on the pitch in each match. It was being discontinued in the 2025–26 season.

=== Cup eligibility ===
- Senior Shield: Level 1
- FA Cup: Level 1
- League Cup: Level 1
- FA Cup Junior Division: Level 2–4

== Notable clubs ==
- Kitchee
- Eastern
- South China
- Happy Valley (defunct)
- Sun Hei
- HKFC
- Instant Dict.
- Seiko (defunct)
- List of football clubs in Hong Kong

== National teams ==
=== Men's ===
The Hong Kong national football team represents Hong Kong in men's international football events. The team competed their first international match in 1947 against South Korea during the colonial period. Even after 1997 the transfer of sovereignty to China, it continues to represent Hong Kong separately from the People's Republic of China as its own national team in international competitions due to the "One country, two systems" principle. The team has never qualified for the FIFA World Cup, with the closest time being the 1986 World Cup cycle, which also highlighted their most successful period.

On 14 January 2024, Hong Kong midfielder Philip Chan Siu-kwan scored the 1,000th goal in Asian Cup history in the team’s return to the competition’s finals for the first time since 1968, despite the team losing 1–3 to the United Arab Emirates.

=== Women's ===
The Hong Kong women's national football team qualified for 14 consecutive AFC Women's Asian Cups between 1975 and 2003. However, the team has not qualified for a major tournament since the 2003 AFC Women's Championship.

== See also ==
- Football Association of Hong Kong, China
