= Public swimming pools in Hong Kong =

Hong Kong swimming venues

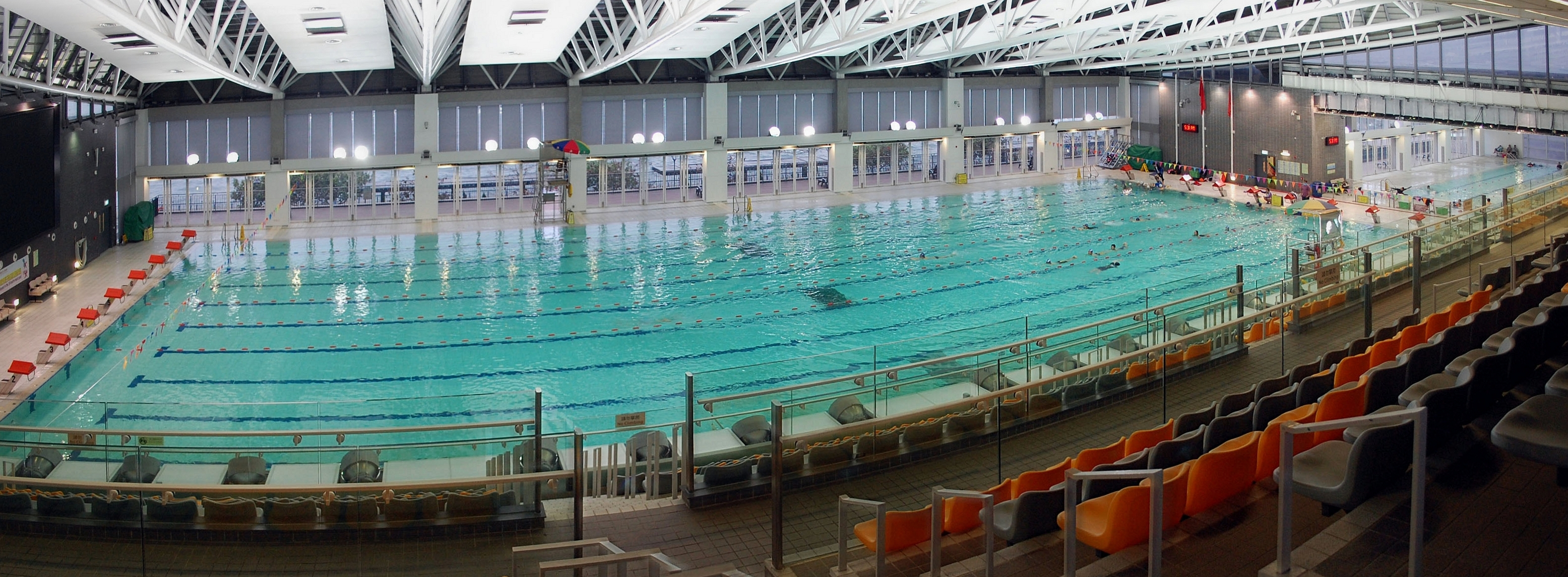
Sun Yat Sen Memorial Park Swimming Pool, opened 2011, in Sai Ying Pun.

Public swimming pools in Hong Kong are managed by the Leisure and Cultural Services Department (LCSD). There are 44 public swimming pools in Hong Kong; 9 in Hong Kong Island, 13 in Kowloon, and 22 in the New Territories. LCSD manages public swimming pools according to Law of Hong Kong Chapter 132 sections 42 to 45.

== History ==
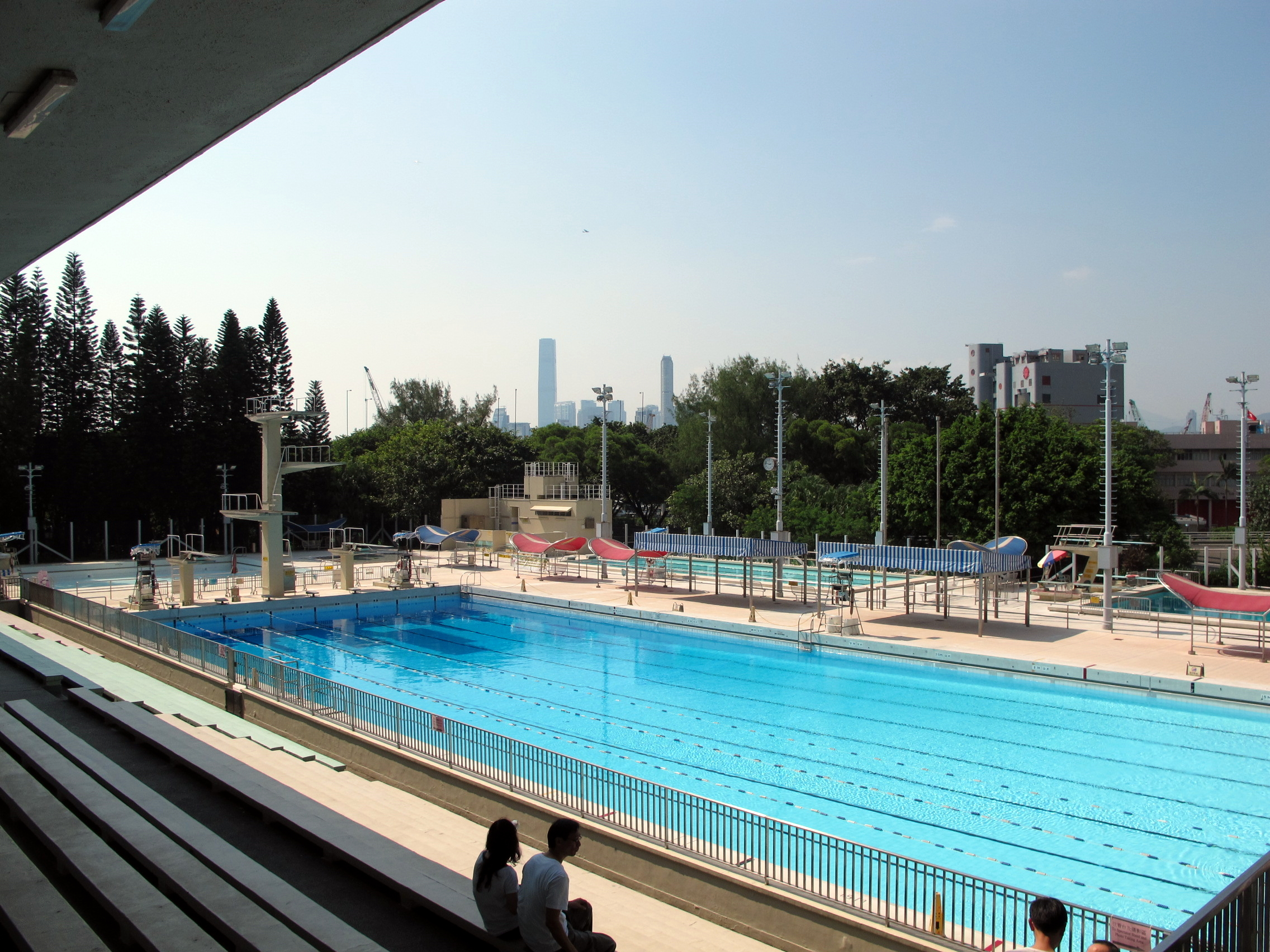
The former pool at Victoria Park, the first public swimming venue in Hong Kong.

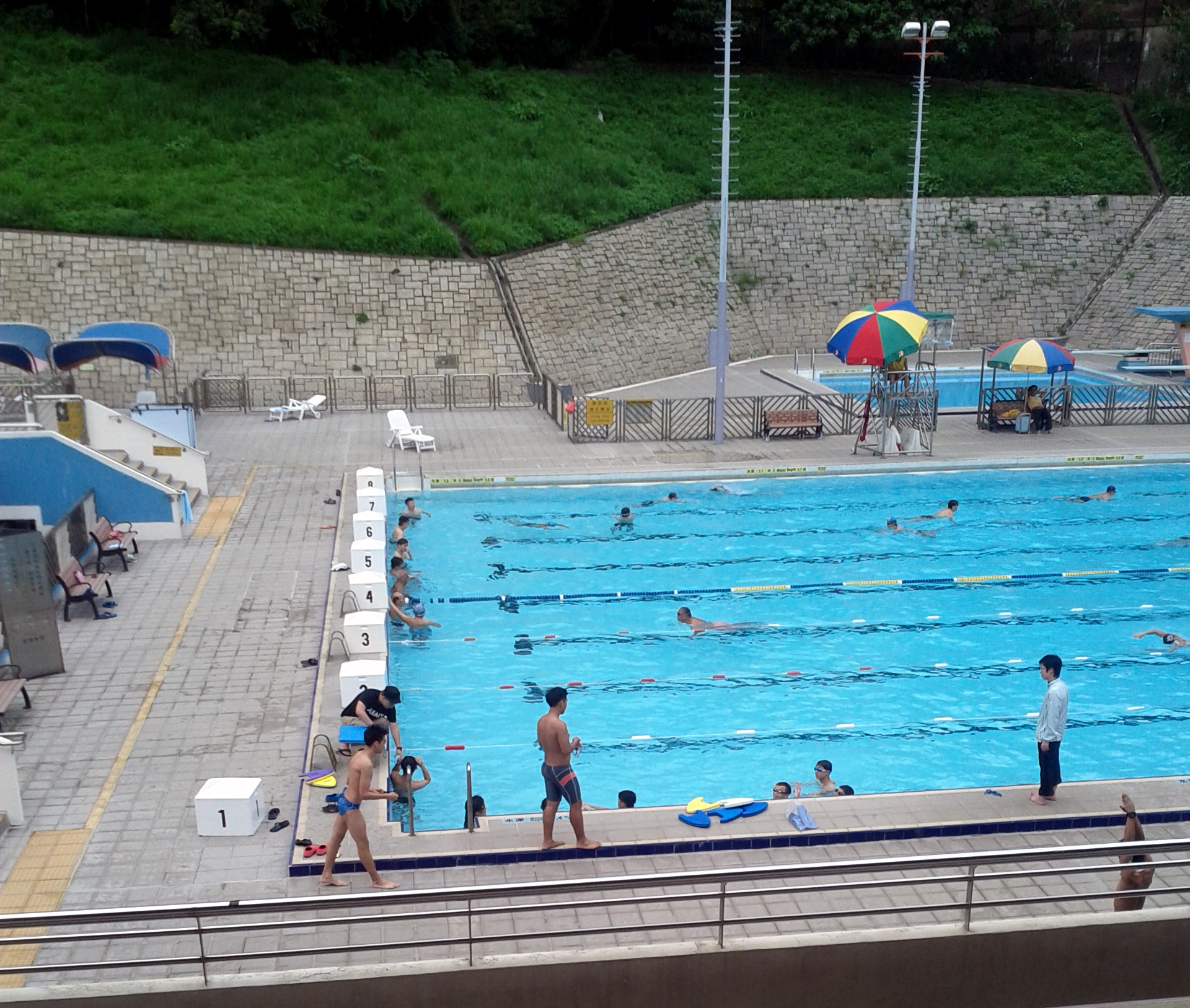
The main pool at Lei Cheng Uk Swimming Pool complex, opened 1971 as one of many funded by the Royal Hong Kong Jockey Club.

=== 20th century ===
Victoria Park Swimming Pool, built and managed by the Urban Council and funded by the Hong Kong Jockey Club, was the first public swimming complex in Hong Kong. The 50 by 20 metre pool was officially unveiled on 16 October 1957 by former Governor Sir Alexander Grantham. It was highly popular with residents, and served over 360,000 over its first year of operation. The spectator stand seated 1,700. This facility operated continuously until 2013, when it was closed and replaced by a new indoor swimming pool (of the same name) on the site adjacent. The old pool will consequently be demolished, sparking some mourning of the loss of a piece of the collective memory of many Hong Kong residents. In response, the LCSD stated they would "explore the possibility" of displaying some items of historical significance, such as the plaque unveiled by Governor Grantham, at the new facility, and planned to make use of "3D laser scanning technology" to record the architecture of the old pool complex.

Kowloon Tsai Swimming Pool, in Kowloon Tsai Park, opened in 1964 as the first public swimming pool in Kowloon. The opening of the facility was publicised internationally in a British Pathé newsreel, which stated a construction cost of £125,000 and highlighted the lack of bathing beaches in the densely populated vicinity.

The first indoor heated public pool, Morrison Hill Swimming Pool in Wan Chai, opened in 1972. While many swimming facilities close in the winter season, the public now has the option of visiting 24 different public heated pools, both indoor and outdoor, which remain open during the colder months.

Many swimming complexes of the 1960s and 1970s were funded, in part or whole, by the Royal Hong Kong Jockey Club. One of these was the Tsuen Wan Swimming Pool, opened 1975, which was the first public swimming pool in the New Territories. The name was changed to Kwai Shing Swimming Pool in 1978. The standardised design of the complex is typical of the era, incorporating two 50-metre pools, changing rooms and lobby located mostly underneath a covered grandstand, and several other smaller teaching pools.

The Pao Yue-Kong Swimming Pool complex, the only public pool in Southern District, was officially opened on 9 July 1977 by then-Governor Sir Murray MacLehose. It is named after Yue-Kong Pao, who donated funds toward its establishment.

The Sha Tin Jockey Club Swimming Pool, the largest pool complex in Sha Tin District, opened in April 1981. The Royal Hong Kong Jockey Club funded the $33 million project in its entirety as to commemorate the opening of the nearby Sha Tin Racecourse.

In the 1980s, the Urban Council announced a policy of building more "fun pools" with special free-form designs and water toys. A councilor explained, "It is felt that these fun pools will provide more fun, excitement and enjoyment for the public who no longer regard swimming as a mere form of exercise." In 1985, four such pools were planned for Kowloon and a fifth for Hong Kong Island.

The Regional Council (RegCo) was founded in 1986. Prior to that date, swimming pools in the New Territories fell under the purview of the Director of Urban Services, as the Urban Services Department, the executive arm of the Urban Council, had been servicing the New Territories since its establishment in 1953. The operation of New Territories swimming pools was subsequently transferred to RegCo, who also built new facilities.

Kowloon Park Swimming Pool, opened on 12 September 1989, has undergone several upgrades in recent years. It served as the venue for the aquatics events in the 2009 East Asian Games, and is today has the highest patronage of all pool complexes in Hong Kong, serving over 2000 swimmers per day.

=== 21st century ===
With the dissolution of the Urban Council and Regional Council at the end of the millennium, operations of all public swimming pools were taken up by the newly formed Leisure and Cultural Services Department (LCSD).

Controversy erupted in 2004 after thousands of bloodworms were found in various public swimming pools. The worms reportedly posed no threat to humans, but LCSD management came under fire for not being forthcoming about the issue. A "massive cleanup" was undertaken to eliminate the worms.

==== 2004 lifeguard staffing cuts ====
In 2004 the LCSD slashed the lifeguard workforce from around 2,400 to 1,580. The Hong Kong and Kowloon Life Guards’ Union has spoken out against this cut in the years since, stating that it is unsafe and puts unreasonable pressure on the lifeguards. Many swimming pools have protest signage about this issue, which the LCSD has asked the lifeguards to remove. The lifeguards have gone on strike in 2004, 2005, and 2014.

==== 2014 lifeguard strike ====
In August 2014, at the height of the summer swimming season, many lifeguards serving Hong Kong's beaches and swimming pools went on strike. About 400 lifeguards staged a sit-in at the headquarters of the Leisure and Cultural Services Department in Sha Tin.

Lifesaving staff complained that since lifeguard numbers were cut drastically in 2004 their workload has been too great, with lifeguards having to look after greater numbers of swimmers, and warned that safety had been compromised by the government cutbacks. They said the situation has been exacerbated by crowding caused by increasing numbers of mainland tourists at Hong Kong pools and beaches. The vice chairman of the Hong Kong and Kowloon Lifeguards' Union complained, "some of them urinate everywhere and jump into the pool without wearing swim suits, or bring food to the venue. They don't have the same personal hygiene and safety standards."

It was suggested that the influx of mainland swimmers was a result of poor water quality in mainland Chinese swimming pools. A Shenzhen newspaper, Southern Metropolis Daily, had also published an article highlighting the affordability and good facilities of Hong Kong's pools compared to those in Shenzhen. After the report was published, the number of LCSD pool closures due to contamination of the pool water with vomit or feces reached the highest level in six years. As a result of the staff shortage during the strike, some pools were temporarily closed and certain facilities at others, like toddler pools, shut down to divert staff resources.

==== New pools ====
In recent years the LCSD has replaced several older facilities. The new HK$800 million facility at Victoria Park hosts a 50 by 25 metre main pool, a multi-purpose pool with adjustable depth floor and diving platform, and the largest swimming pool spectator stand in Hong Kong, seating 2,500. On 11 May 2011, the first phase of the new Kennedy Town Swimming Pool opened, relocated in order to facilitate West Island line construction works. On 1 April 2013, the new Kwun Tong Swimming Pool opened on a site directly adjacent to the old pool complex.

Several new pools are planned. A new Wan Chai Swimming Pool recently opened to replace an older pool of the same name, which will be demolished to make way for the new Exhibition Centre station of the Sha Tin to Central Link. Another new pool is planned for Tin Shui Wai North, as the two existing pools in the new town are very crowded.

== Monthly ticket scheme ==
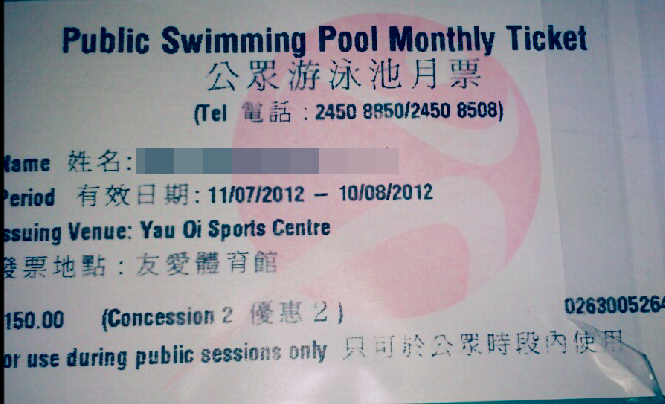
A Public Swimming Pool Monthly Ticket in Hong Kong ($150) with name of holder, valid date and issuing venue.

The Public Swimming Pool Monthly Ticket Scheme (Chinese: 香港公眾游泳池月票計劃) began on 5 July 2012 (ticket selling started on 21 June). The Leisure and Cultural Services Department is responsible for this scheme.

The then Chief executive Sir Donald Tsang Yam-kuen announced in the 2011-2012 Policy Address the introduction of "monthly tickets for public swimming pools to encourage members of the public to swim regularly. Concessionary rates will be available for the elderly, people with disabilities, students and children."

Prices are:

- HKD$300 for monthly ticket (half price for students, children from 3 to 13 years old, persons aged 60 and above).
- HKD$19 for single entrance admission, HKD$9 concessionary rate.

All public swimming pools in Hong Kong are available except Wan Chai Swimming Pool.

== List of pools ==
=== Hong Kong Island ===
| English name | Chinese name | Opened | Notes | Refs. | Images |
|---|---|---|---|---|---|
| Pao Yue Kong Swimming Pool | 包玉剛游泳池 | 1977 | Called "Aberdeen Swimming Pool" until 1983. | | |
| Kennedy Town Swimming Pool | 堅尼地城游泳池 | 2011 | Replaced earlier pool of same name opened 1974. | | |
| Sun Yat Sen Memorial Park Swimming Pool | 中山紀念公園游泳池 | 2011 | | | |
| Morrison Hill Swimming Pool | 摩理臣山游泳池 | 1972 | | | |
| Wan Chai Swimming Pool | 灣仔游泳池 | 2015 | Open for group training only. Replaced older pool opened in 1984. | | |
| Chai Wan Swimming Pool | 柴灣游泳池 | 1980 | | | |
| Siu Sai Wan Swimming Pool | 小西灣游泳池 | 2011 | | | |
| Victoria Park Swimming Pool | 維多利亞公園游泳池 | 2013 | Replaced earlier pool of same name opened 1957. | | |
| Island East Swimming Pool | 港島東游泳池 | 2001 | | | |

=== Kowloon ===
| English name | Chinese name | Opened | Notes | Refs. | Images |
|---|---|---|---|---|---|
| Lai Chi Kok Park Swimming Pool | 荔枝角公園游泳池 | 1984 | | | |
| Lei Cheng Uk Swimming Pool | 李鄭屋游泳池 | 1971 | | | |
| Sham Shui Po Park Swimming Pool | 深水埗公園游泳池 | 1985 | | | |
| Kowloon Park Swimming Pool | 九龍公園游泳池 | 1989 | | | |
| Tai Kok Tsui Swimming Pool | 大角咀游泳池 | 2006 | | | |
| Tai Wan Shan Swimming Pool | 大環山游泳池 | 1977 | Originally called "Tai Wan Swimming Pool". | | |
| Ho Man Tin Swimming Pool | 何文田游泳池 | 2000 | | | |
| Kowloon Tsai Swimming Pool | 九龍仔游泳池 | 1964 | | | |
| Morse Park Swimming Pool | 摩士公園游泳池 | 1970 | | | |
| Hammer Hill Road Swimming Pool | 斧山道游泳池 | 1996 | | | |
| Jordan Valley Swimming Pool | 佐敦谷游泳池 | 1997 | | | |
| Kwun Tong Swimming Pool | 觀塘游泳池 | 2013 | Replaced earlier pool of same name opened 1971. | | |
| Lam Tin Swimming Pool | 藍田游泳池 | 2012 | | | |

=== New Territories ===
| English name | Chinese name | Opened | Notes | Refs. | Images |
|---|---|---|---|---|---|
| Mui Wo Swimming Pool | 梅窩游泳池 | 1992 | | | |
| Tung Chung Swimming Pool | 東涌游泳池 | 2011 | | | |
| Tuen Mun Swimming Pool | 屯門游泳池 | 1985 | | | |
| Jockey Club Yan Oi Tong Swimming Pool | 賽馬會仁愛堂游泳池 | 1985 | | | |
| Tuen Mun North West Swimming Pool | 屯門西北游泳池 | 2013 | | | |
| Tin Shui Wai Swimming Pool | 天水圍游泳池 | 1994 | | | |
| Yuen Long Swimming Pool | 元朗游泳池 | 1983 | | | |
| Ping Shan Tin Shui Wai Swimming Pool | 屏山天水圍游泳池 | 2011 | | | |
| Shing Mun Valley Swimming Pool | 城門谷游泳池 | 5 December 1998 | | | |
| Tsuen King Circuit Wu Chung Swimming Pool | 荃景圍胡忠游泳池 | 1987 | | | |
| Kwai Shing Swimming Pool | 葵盛游泳池 | 10 October 1975 | Called "Tsuen Wan Swimming Pool" until 1978. | | |
| North Kwai Chung Jockey Club Swimming Pool | 北葵涌賽馬會游泳池 | 1984 | | | |
| Tsing Yi Swimming Pool | 青衣游泳池 | 30 September 1996 | | | |
| Tsing Yi Southwest Swimming Pool | 青衣西南游泳池 | 26 July 2017 | | | |
| Fanling Swimming Pool | 粉嶺游泳池 | 1978 | | | |
| Sheung Shui Swimming Pool | 上水游泳池 | 1992 | | | |
| Tai Po Swimming Pool | 大埔游泳池 | 1992 | | | |
| Hin Tin Swimming Pool | 顯田游泳池 | 1992 | Phase II (indoor pools) opened 2007. | | |
| Ma On Shan Swimming Pool | 馬鞍山游泳池 | 1997 | | | |
| Sha Tin Jockey Club Swimming Pool | 沙田賽馬會游泳池 | 1981 | Built in two phases. | | |
| Sai Kung Swimming Pool | 西貢游泳池 | 1992 | | | |
| Tseung Kwan O Swimming Pool | 將軍澳游泳池 | 2001 | | | |

=== Proposed pools ===
| English name (working) | Chinese name | Notes | Refs. |
|---|---|---|---|
| Tin Shui Wai Area 107 Swimming Pool | 天水圍107 區游泳池 | Proposal to relieve the badly congested pools of Yuen Long District. Under construction as of 2020. | |
| Pool next to Aldrich Garden, Shau Kei Wan | | Proposal by Eastern District Council, under consideration by LSCD as of 2014. | |
| Sports Centre-cum-Indoor Heated Swimming Pool in Area 65, Tseung Kwan O | | Proposal by Sai Kung District Council, under consideration by LSCD as of 2014. | |
| Amenity Complex in Area 103, Ma On Shan | 馬鞍山第103區綜合設施大樓 | Indoor complex including a 25-metre training pool and a 25-metre teaching pool, both heated. Awaiting Legislative Council funding as of January 2020. | |
