= Kowloon Tsai Swimming Pool =

Swimming pool in Kowloon, Hong Kong

Coordinates: 22.3332°N 114.1845°E

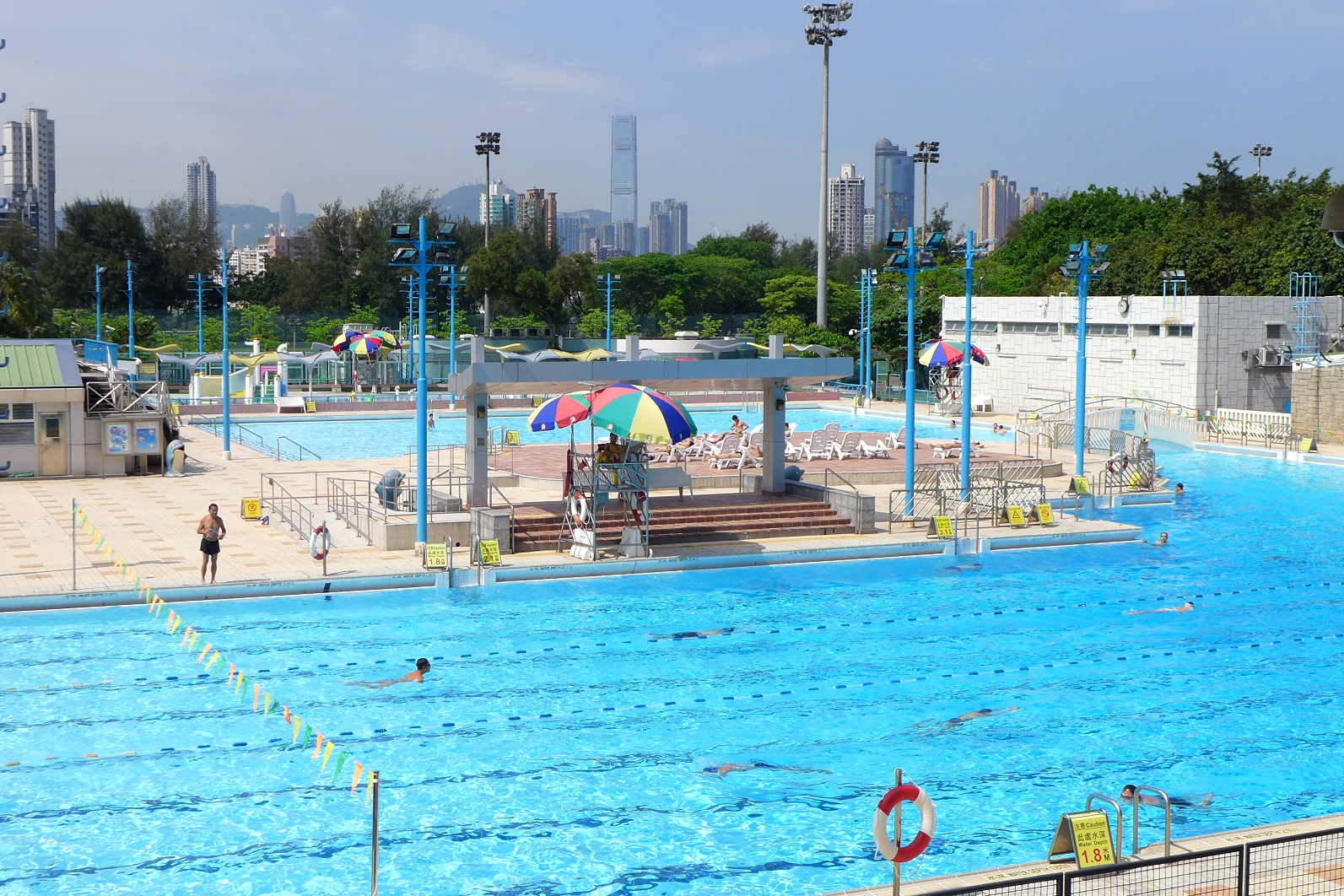
- Swimming pool
- Interactive map of Kowloon Tsai Swimming Pool
- Location: No. 13 Inverness Road, Kowloon
- Operator: Leisure and Cultural Services Department
- Type: Open air

Construction
- Opened: 5 June 1964
- Cost: HK$3.5 million

Website
- Official website

The Kowloon Tsai Swimming Pool (Chinese: 九龍仔游泳池) was the first public swimming pool complex in Kowloon, Hong Kong. Since the old Victoria Park Swimming Pool was demolished in 2014, it stands as the oldest existing public swimming pool in Hong Kong.

The pool complex is located in Kowloon Tsai Park and comprises a main 50 metre pool, a leisure pool, and a children's pool.

== History ==
It was decided in 1958 to build a swimming pool in Kowloon. On 5 January 1960 the chairman of the Urban Council announced that a swimming pool would be built at Kowloon Tsai, on an area of land levelled to provide a safer approach for aircraft approaching the new runway at Kai Tak Airport.

The pool's construction cost about $3.5 million, of which more than $2 million was contributed by the Royal Hong Kong Jockey Club. Works began on 30 March 1962 by contractors Hung Yue and Co. The pool's opening date was delayed by slow construction. The complex was finally opened on 5 June 1964 by Governor David Trench and Lady Trench. The Urban Council invited 2,000 children to attend the ceremony. Sir David unveiled a memorial plaque at the pool's entrance and fired a pistol to start the first school swimming race held there.

Kowloon Tsai Swimming Pool was the first public swimming pool in Kowloon, and patronage in the first 30 days of operation averaged 4,784 people per day, well exceeding use of the territory's only other existing pool at Victoria Park. It is located in Kowloon Tsai Park, the first phase of which also opened in 1964. The opening of the pool was publicised internationally in a British Pathé newsreel, which stated a construction cost of £125,000 and highlighted the lack of bathing beaches in the densely populated vicinity. The pools are surrounded by various one-storey buildings housing changing rooms and offices. The pool water was originally supplied by a well sunk under the park specifically for this purpose.

Originally, the pool's operating hours would end at 4:00 pm because it was situated under the airport flight path, hence the Civil Aviation Department prohibited the use of outdoor floodlighting there.

== Planned demolition ==
The government plans to demolish the pool and replace it with a new complex with indoor and outdoor pools. The Architectural Services Department invited private architectural firms to bid on the project in late 2015.
