= Kowloon Tsai =

Area of Kowloon, Hong Kong

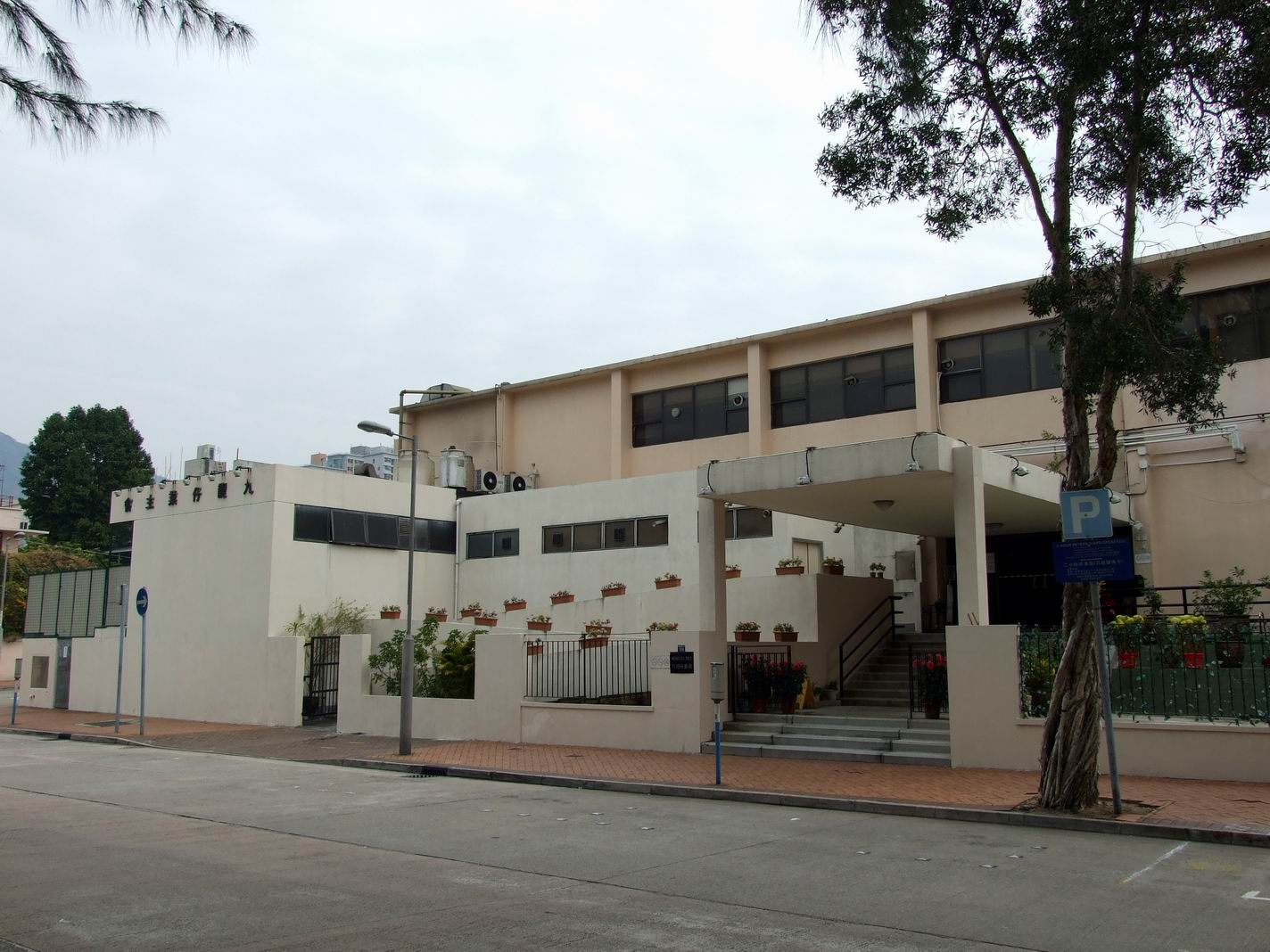
The Kowloon Tsai Home Owners Association Building, Cambridge Road

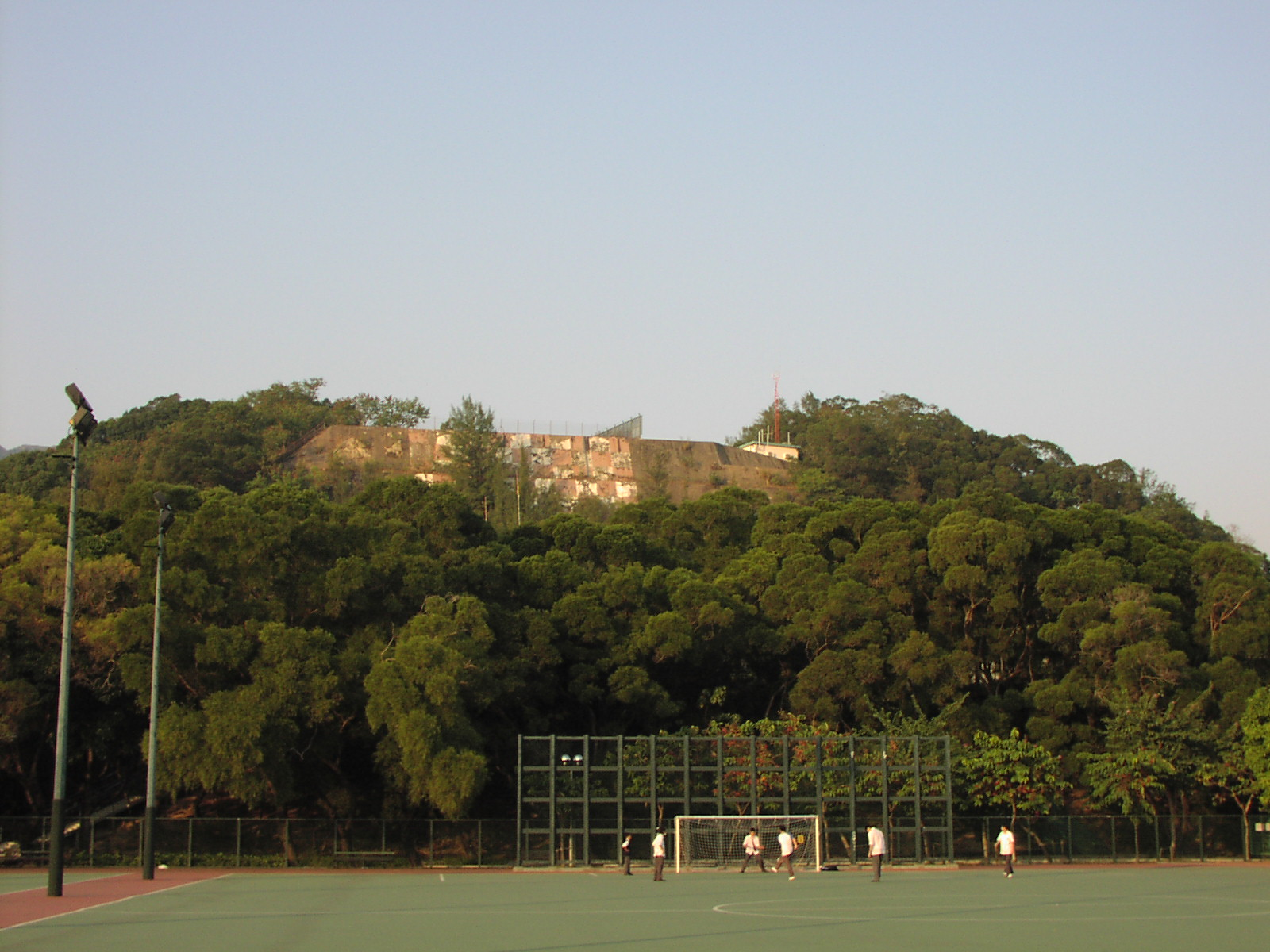
The "Checkerboard Hill", which served as a navigational aid for the Kai Tak Airport, as seen from Kowloon Tsai Park.

Kowloon Tsai (Chinese: 九龍仔) is a place in Kowloon Tong, Hong Kong. It was formerly a village in a valley, which has now been developed into a low-density and upscale residential area in New Kowloon.

== History ==
According to the Gazetteer of Xin'an county, Kowloon Tsai village was built before A.D. 1819.

The Hong Kong Golden Jubilee Jamborette (香港金禧大露營) was held between 27 December 1961 and 2 January 1962, celebrating the Golden jubilee (50 year anniversary) of Hong Kong Scouting with theme One World (天下一家). At Kowloon Tsai, now named Kowloon Tsai Park, the Jamboree hosted 2,732 Scouts in the challenging winter with heavy rain.

== Notable places, streets and buildings ==
- City University of Hong Kong
- Nam Shan Estate
- Kowloon Tsai Park
- Maryknoll Convent School
- La Salle College
- La Salle Primary School
- Kowloon City Plaza
- Rhenish Church Pang Hok-ko Memorial College
- Osborn Barracks
- Oxford Road
- Lancashire Road
- Shaw Campus and Baptist University Road Campus, Hong Kong Baptist University

=== College Road ===
College Road (traditional Chinese: 書院道; simplified Chinese: 书院道; Cantonese Yale: shyū yún douh) is a two-way road in Kowloon Tsai connecting Boundary Street on the south to Sau Chuk Yuen Road and Nga Tsin Wai Road‌ to the north. It is about 610 feet (190 m) long and 49 feet (15 m) wide. It was dedicated on Friday 7 February 1958 by gazette along with Nga Tsin Wai Road, and was named after La Salle College, nearby at 18 La Salle Road‌ (NKIL no. 1127), a parallel street about 550 feet (180 yd) to its west. The Oriental Daily said in 2012 that the road has "many famous schools".
