= Checkerboard Hill =

Hill in Kowloon Tsai, Hong Kong

- 格仔山
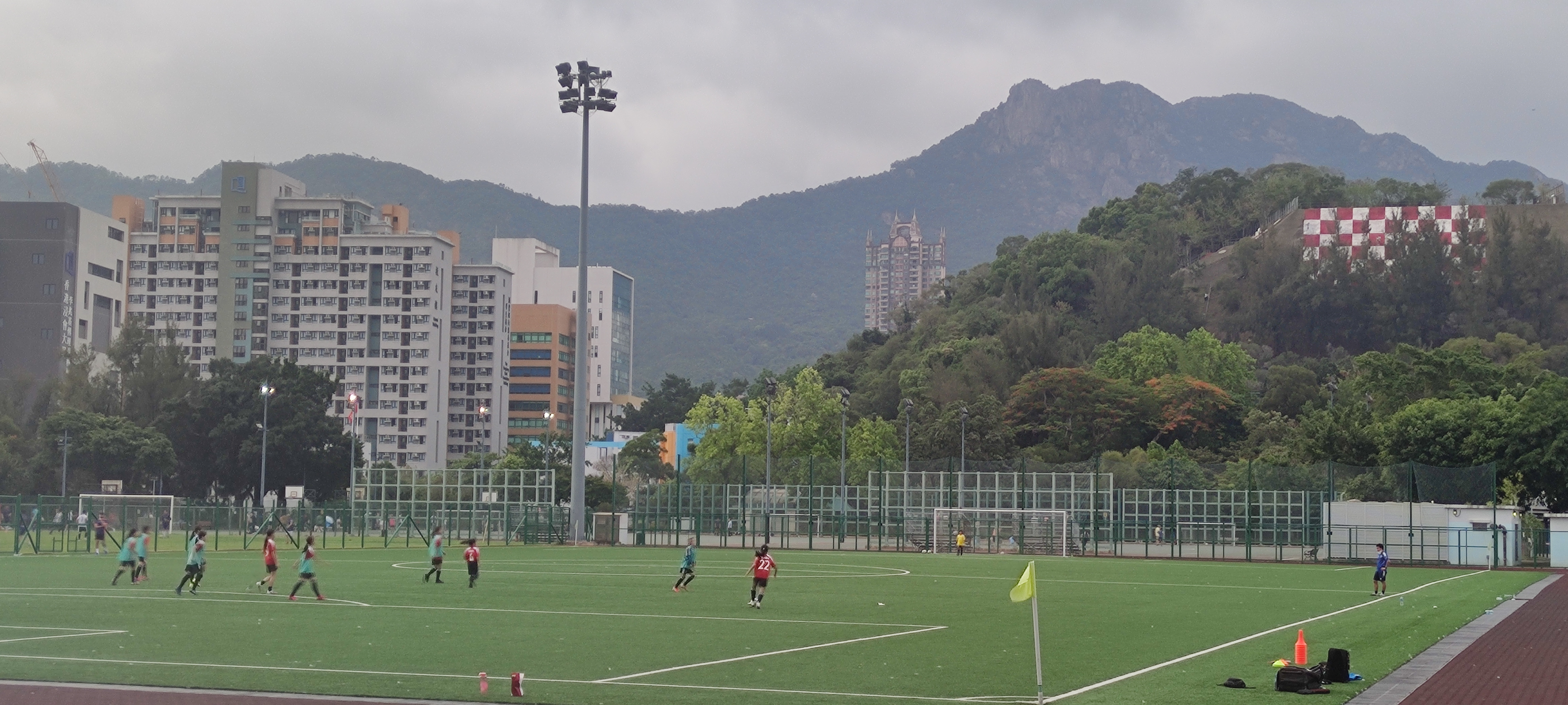
- Checkerboard Hill, seen in May 2022.

Highest point
- Elevation: 98 m (322 ft)
- Coordinates: 22°20′09″N 114°11′03″E

Geography
- Location within Hong Kong
- Location: Hong Kong

Checkerboard Hill (Chinese: 格仔山), also known as Kowloon Tsai Hill (九龍仔山) and Tak Mee Mountain (德美山), is a small hill in the northern Kowloon Peninsula of Hong Kong that formerly served as an aid to the Instrument Guidance System (IGS) for the now-closed Kai Tak Airport. Standing at 98 metres (322 ft) tall, Checkerboard Hill is located next to Kowloon Tsai Park and the Lok Fu Service Reservoir Rest Garden (樂富配水庫休憩花園) of Lok Fu Park (樂富公園), and it is not far from Lion Rock Country Park. The closest MTR station to access the Checkerboard Hill is Lok Fu.

== Name ==
a Singapore Airlines Boeing 747-400 turning at Checkerboard Hill to land at Kai Tak Airport in British Hong Kong (November 1994)

The hill's name originates from its use as a visual aid to pilots for approach and landing onto Runway 13 of the former Kai Tak Airport. Pilots would set their onboard navigation systems to fly the Instrument Guidance System (IGS) path straight towards a large red and white checkerboard on the side of the hill. Once the checkerboard pattern was sighted and identified, they would make a low-altitude right-hand turn to align visually with Runway 13.

Kai Tak Airport was demanding for pilots, and it required special training, since the approach to runway 13 could not be flown entirely by instrument, but required instead to aim towards a fixed obstacle, and then break away visually to land on its right.

== Closure of Kai Tak and checkerboard restoration ==
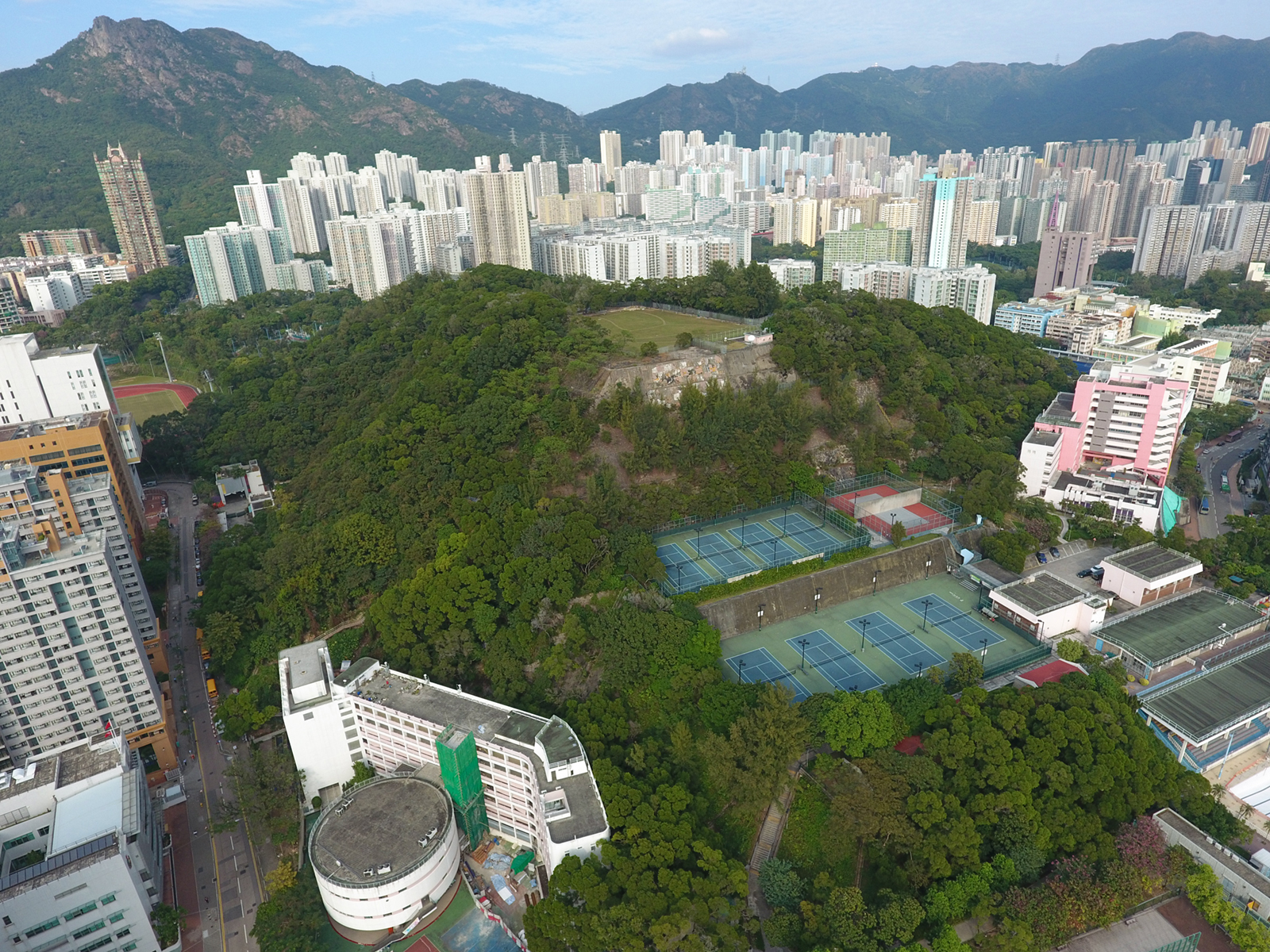
View of Checkboard Hill before the restoration. The faded checkerboard pattern is visible uphill from the tennis courts.

Following the decommissioning of Kai Tak and the opening of Chek Lap Kok International Airport, the hill and the checkerboard became abandoned, wherein the latter became faded and overgrown with new trees. The checkerboard was not restored probably because it may confuse pilots landing at Chek Lap Kok, since the Kai Tak Runway 13 approach also involved flying over Lantau Island.

During the peak of the COVID-19 pandemic, from 2020 to 2021, restoration work was carried out on both the west and south sides of Checkerboard Hill. The checkerboard pattern was repainted to its original colors and now acts as a monument to Kai Tak Airport.

== See also ==
- Geography of Hong Kong
- List of mountains, peaks and hills in Hong Kong
- Lion Rock
