= 1965 Hong Kong USMC KC-130F crash =

Plane crash in Hong Kong

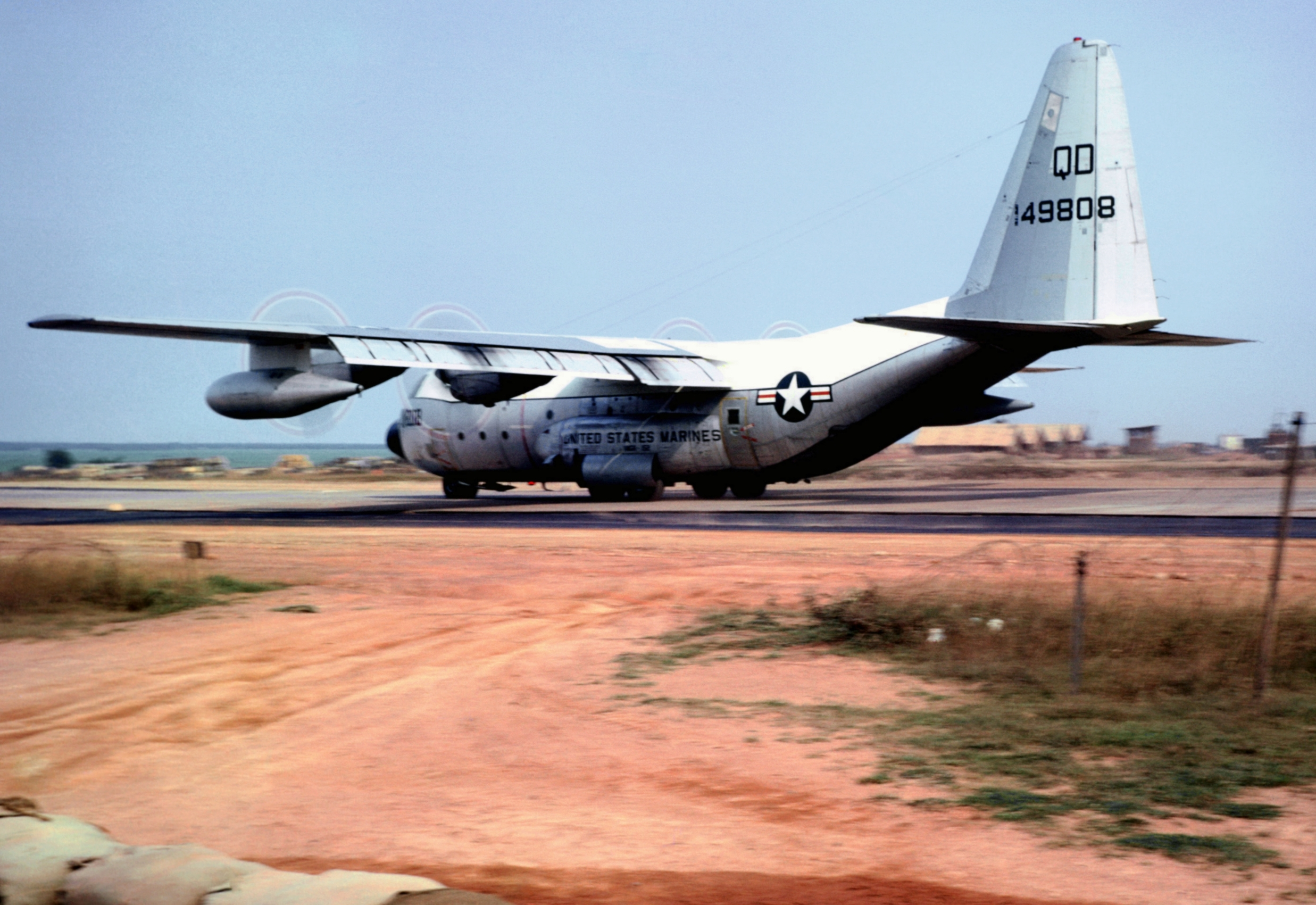
- A similar US Marine Corps KC-130F landing at Dong Ha Air Base in South Vietnam during the Vietnam War.

Accident
- Date: August 24, 1965
- Summary: Loss of control due to engine failure
- Site: Kai Tak International Airport (HKG/VHHH) in British Hong Kong

Aircraft
- Aircraft type: Lockheed KC-130F Hercules
- Operator: United States Marine Corps
- Registration: 149802
- Flight origin: Kai Tak International Airport (HKG/VHHH) in British Hong Kong
- Stopover: Da Nang Air Base in South Vietnam
- Destination: Tan Son Nhut Air Base in Saigon, South Vietnam
- Occupants: 71
- Passengers: 65
- Crew: 6
- Fatalities: 59
- Survivors: 12

A United States Marines Corps (USMC) Lockheed KC-130F Hercules, ferrying a group of US marines back to South Vietnam from rest-and-relaxation leave in then-British Hong Kong, crashed on take-off, causing a total of 59 deaths out of the 71 people on board the aircraft on August 24, 1965.

== The accident ==
The accident began after the aircraft, a USMC Lockheed KC-130F Hercules (Bu.No.149802), veered to the left shortly after take-off, struck a sea-wall and then crashed and plunged into the waters surrounding Kai Tak Airport's runway at a distance of 40 ft (12 m) off Hong Kong Island.

== Cause ==
The cause of the accident was attributed to a partial failure of the number one engine during the plane's take-off from the runway.
