= Kwun Tong Swimming Pool =

Swimming pool in Kwun Tong, Hong Kong

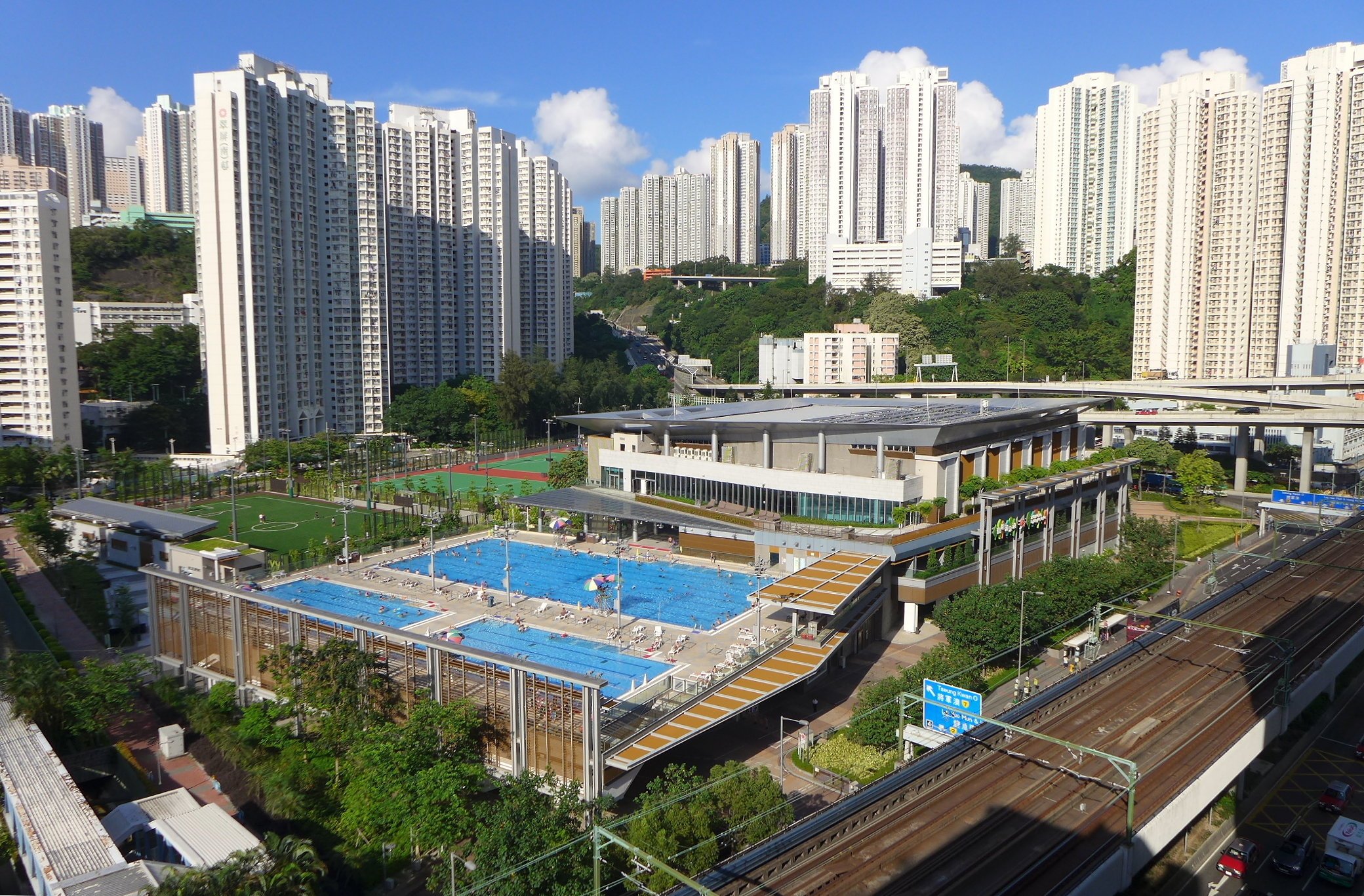
- Kwun Tong Swimming Pool
- Interactive map of Kwun Tong Swimming Pool
- Location: 2 Tsui Ping Road, Kwun Tong, Hong Kong
- Coordinates: 22.3105413°N 114.2300679°E
- Operator: Leisure and Cultural Services Department
- Type: Indoor and outdoor

Construction
- Opened: 25 July 1971; 54 years ago (old site); 1 April 2013; 13 years ago (current site)
- Construction cost: HK$1,323.8 million
- Architect: Ronald Lu and Partners

Website
- Official website

Kwun Tong Swimming Pool
- Traditional Chinese: 觀塘游泳池
- Simplified Chinese: 观塘游泳池
Transcriptions
Standard Mandarin
- Hanyu Pinyin: Guàntáng Yóuyǒngchí
Yue: Cantonese
- Jyutping: gun1 tong4 jau4 wing6 ci4

Kwun Tong Swimming Pool (Chinese: 觀塘游泳池) is a public swimming pool in Kwun Tong, Kowloon, Hong Kong and is the largest swimming pool complex in Kwun Tong District. It is located south of Tsui Ping Estate and is close to Kwun Tong and Lam Tin stations. Currently, it is managed by the Leisure and Cultural Services Department of Hong Kong Government. Covering an area of about 23,038 m^{2}, there are multiple outdoor indoor swimming pool facilities, which provide residents in the district with all-day indoor and outdoor swimming venues. It is also a popular choice for residents of East Kowloon to learn to swim.

== History ==
The old Kwun Tong Swimming Pool, built and originally managed by the Urban Council, opened on 25 July 1971. The Royal Hong Kong Jockey Club donated HK$5,410,000 toward the construction of the swimming complex, which was located immediately north of the current pool. It was formally opened on 30 October 1971 by Princess Anne.

In 2000, the Urban Council was disbanded by the government, and management of the swimming pool became the responsibility of the newly formed Leisure and Cultural Services Department (LCSD).

The government proposed in 2002 to build the Kwun Tong Town Hall and rebuild the Kwun Tong Swimming Pool on the original swimming pool site, but this plan was shelved in 2006.

The Leisure and Cultural Services Department applied for funding in 2009 to build a new Kwun Tong swimming pool on the old site of the Kwun Tong Recreation Ground Football Field, which was constructed by Gammon Construction and was opened on 1 April 2013. It was officially opened by the late Florence Hui on 26 October 2013.

== Facilities ==
Indoor facilities

- Main pool
- Training pool
- Spectator stand (1,492 seats)
- Electronic scoreboard
- Family changing room

Outdoor facilities

- Secondary pool
- Two teaching pools
- Sun bathing area
