= Kowloon Tsai Park =

Public park in Kowloon Tsai, Hong Kong

Coordinates: 22.332384°N 114.183480°E

- 九龍仔公園
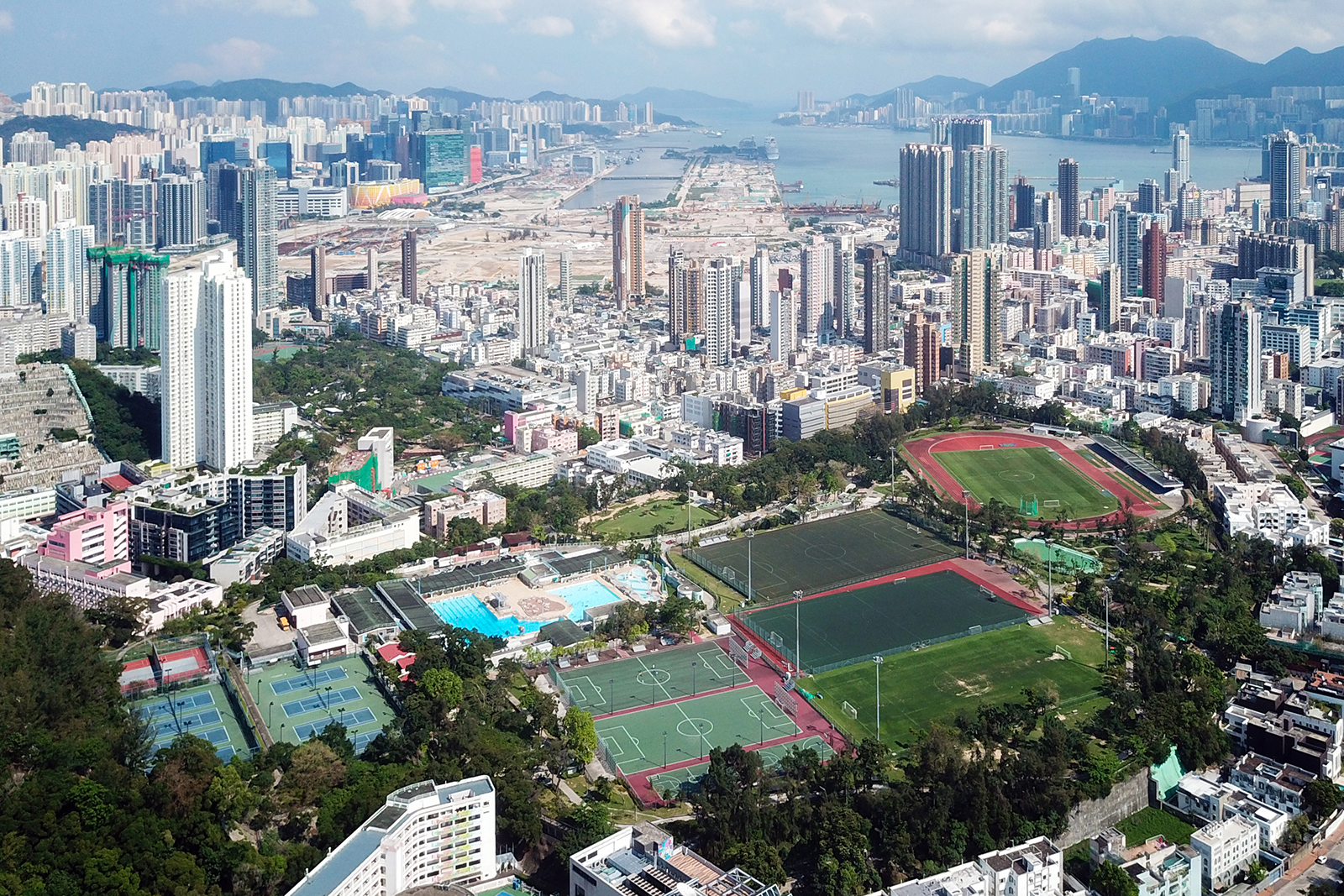
- Aerial overview photo (2019)
- Interactive map of Kowloon Tsai Park
- Location: 13 Inverness Road, Kowloon Tsai, New Kowloon, Hong Kong
- Area: 14.99 hectares (37.0 acres)
- Opened: 5 June 1964; 62 years ago
- Operator: Leisure and Cultural Services Department
- Public transit: Lok Fu station

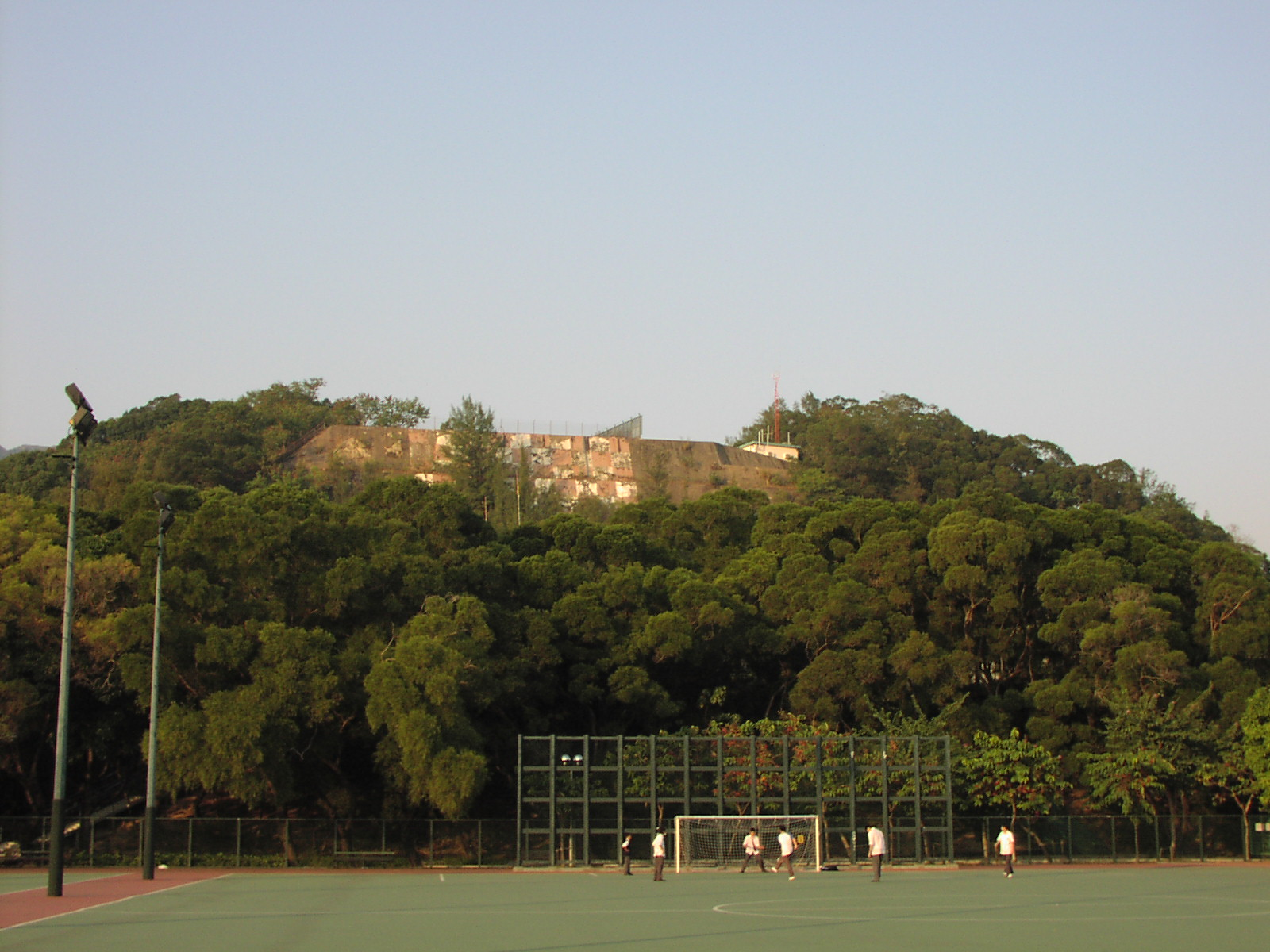
The "checkerboard" on the hill above the park

Kowloon Tsai Park is a park located in the Kowloon Tsai area of New Kowloon in Hong Kong. It lies within the Kowloon City District and opened on 5 June 1964.

== History ==
In the 1950s, the area was used as a borrow area to supply fill for the extension of the nearby Kai Tak Airport runway. The Urban Council commissioned architecture firm Leigh and Orange to draw up plans for the redevelopment of this area of "barren hills and waste lands" as a new recreational area for the citizens of Kowloon. The first phase of the new park opened in 1964.

The Kowloon Tsai Swimming Pool, the first in Kowloon, was funded by the Royal Hong Kong Jockey Club and also opened in 1964. Originally, the pool was not open in the evening because it sat under the airport flight path, hence the Civil Aviation Department would not agree on the use of outdoor floodlighting there.

== Features ==
The park consists of three football fields (2 artificial grass and 1 natural grass), two basketball courts, two 7-a-side football courts, one public swimming pool, two tennis courts, a Bauhinia Garden and children's playgrounds.

Kowloon Tsai Sports Ground is located within the park. It consists of an international standard football field, running tracks and a spectator stand with bathroom facilities. The grandstand seats 1,216.

The Kowloon Tsai Swimming Pool was the first swimming pool in Kowloon. It features a 50-metre competition pool and smaller leisure pools. The LCSD plans to reconstruct the pool complex to provide an indoor heated pool.

The famous checkerboard for the Kai Tak runway 13 approach can be found at the top of the park. Due to this, the hill where the checkerboard was located was christened as Checkerboard Hill.

== See also ==
- List of urban public parks and gardens in Hong Kong
