= Kai Tak Airport =

Airport in Hong Kong (1925–1998)

Kai Tak Airport 啟德機場
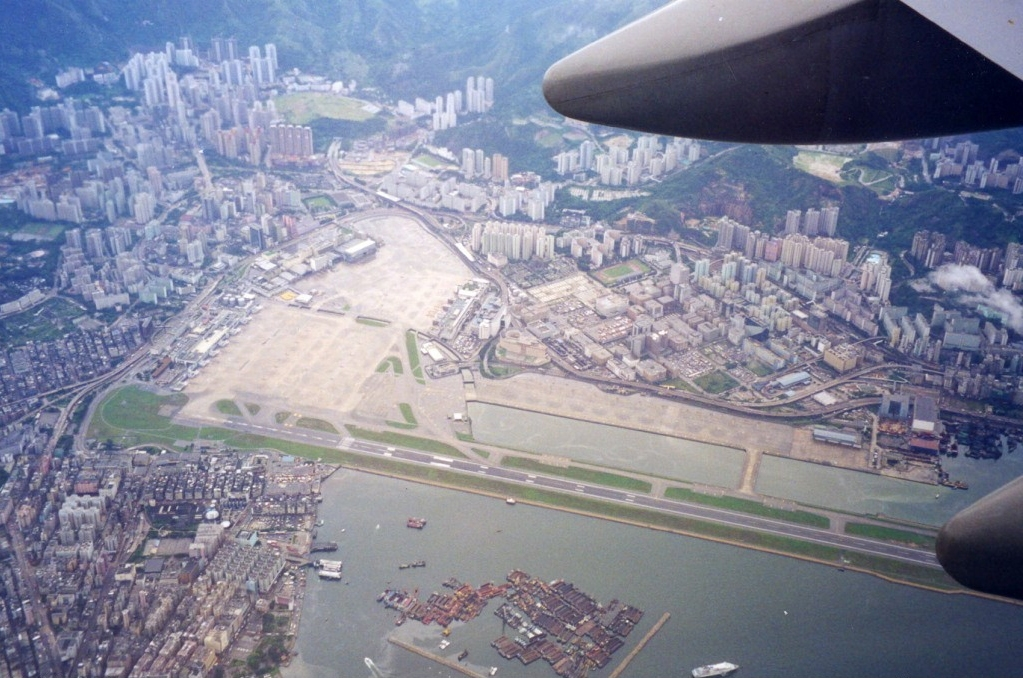
- Aerial view of Kai Tak Airport in 1998, the morning after its closure.
- IATA: ~~HKG~~; ICAO: ~~VHHH~~

Summary
- Owner: Government of Hong Kong
- Operator: Civil Aviation Department
- Serves: Pearl River Delta
- Location: Kowloon, Hong Kong
- Opened: 25 January 1925
- Closed: 6 July 1998
- Hub for: Air Hong Kong (1986–1998); Cathay Pacific (1954–1998); Dragonair (1985–1998); Hong Kong Airways (1947–1959)
- Focus city for: Pan Am (before 1986)
- Elevation AMSL: 9 m (30 ft)
- Coordinates: 22°19′43″N 114°11′39″E

Map
- Location of Kai Tak Airport in Hong Kong

Runways
Direction	Length		Surface
Direction	m	ft	Surface
13/31	3,390	11,122	Asphalt (Closed)

Kai Tak Airport

Chinese name
- Traditional Chinese: 啟德機場
- Simplified Chinese: 启德机场
Transcriptions
Standard Mandarin
- Hanyu Pinyin: Qǐdé Jīchǎng
- Wade–Giles: Ch'i^{3}-te^{2} chi^{1}-ch'ang^{2}
Yue: Cantonese
- Yale Romanization: Káidāk Gēichèuhng
- Jyutping: Kai2dak1 Gei1coeng4

Japanese name
- Kanji: 啓徳空港
Transcriptions
- Romanization: Kaitakku kūkō Keitoku kūkō

Kai Tak Airport ~~(IATA: HKG, ICAO: VHHH)~~ was an international airport of Hong Kong from 1925 until 1998. Officially known as Hong Kong International Airport from 1954 to 6 July 1998, it was often referred to as Hong Kong International Airport and Kai Tak International Airport, to distinguish it from its successor, Chek Lap Kok International Airport, built on reclaimed and levelled land around the islands of Chek Lap Kok and Lam Chau, 30 kilometres (19 mi) to the west.

Because of the geography of the area, with water on three sides of the runway, Kowloon City's residential apartment complexes to the north-west and mountains more than 2,000 feet (610 m) high to the north-east of the airport, aircraft could not fly over the mountains and quickly drop in for a final approach. Instead, aircraft had to fly above Victoria Harbour and Kowloon City, passing north of Mong Kok's Bishop Hill. After passing Bishop Hill, pilots would see Checkerboard Hill with a large orange-and-white checkerboard pattern. Once the pattern was sighted and identified, the aircraft made a low-altitude (sub-600 ft; 180 m) 47-degree right-hand turn, ending with a short final approach and touchdown. For pilots, this airport was technically demanding, as the approach could not be flown by aircraft instruments, but had to be flown visually because of the right-hand turn required.

The airport was home to Hong Kong's international carrier Cathay Pacific, as well as regional carrier Dragonair (since 2016 known as Cathay Dragon), freight airline Air Hong Kong and Hong Kong Airways. The airport was also home to the former RAF Kai Tak and the Hong Kong Aviation Club.

== Geographic environment ==
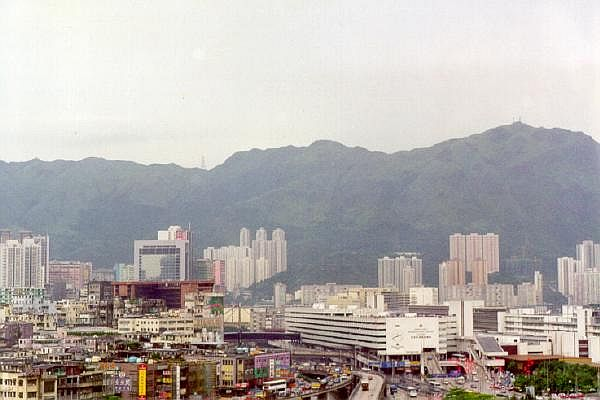
The airport was surrounded by high-rise buildings. The airport car park is at the centre, and offices are on the right of the photograph.

Kai Tak was located on the eastern side of Kowloon Bay in Kowloon, Hong Kong. The area is surrounded by rugged mountains. Less than 4 km (2.5 mi) to the north and northeast of the former runway 13 threshold is a range of hills reaching an elevation of 2,000 ft (610 m). To the east of the former 31 threshold, the hills are less than 3 km (1.9 mi) away. Immediately to the south of the airport is Victoria Harbour, and farther south is Hong Kong Island with hills up to 2,100 ft (640 m).

When Kai Tak closed, there was only one runway in use, numbered 13/31 and oriented southeast–northwest (134/314 degrees true, 136/316 degrees magnetic). The runway was made by reclaiming land from the harbour and was extended several times after its initial construction. The runway was 2,529 m (8,297 ft) when it was opened in 1958 and 3,390 m (11,120 ft) long when the airport closed in 1998. During the period between 1945 and 1955 the airport used a different 13/31 alongside a crossing 07/25. These two runways were 1,450 by 70 m (4,756 by 231 ft) and 1,652 by 61 m (5,420 by 201 ft).

At the northern end of the runway at closure, buildings rose to six stories just across a major multi-lane arterial road. The other three sides of the runway were surrounded by Victoria Harbour. The low-altitude turning manoeuvre before the shortened final approach was so close to these buildings that passengers could spot television sets in the apartments: "...as the plane banked sharply to the right for landing ... the people watching television in the nearby apartments seemed an unsettling arm's length away."

== History ==
=== 1925 to 1930s ===
The story of Kai Tak started in 1912 when two businessmen, Ho Kai and Au Tak, formed the Kai Tak Land Investment Company to reclaim land in Kowloon Bay for real estate development. The site was named Kai Tak Bund. The company finished reclaiming the land in 1920, but the business plan subsequently failed. In 1924, the Hong Kong Aero Club utilised part of the land, and Harry Abbott, an American pilot, rented 60 acres (24 ha). The following year, he opened the short-lived Abbott School of Aviation and performed aerobatics. The site was then called Kowloon City Flying Field. In addition, the Royal Air Force (RAF) parked some of its planes on the land.

The RAF proposed the construction of an airfield in 1927, and the land was acquired by the government. The name Kai Tak was chosen. In 1928, a concrete slipway was constructed for seaplanes. Work on the airfield was completed in 1930, and it was placed under the management of the Harbour Department. The first control tower and a hangar were erected at Kai Tak in 1935. Imperial Airways launched service to the British Straits Settlement of Penang in March 1936. The flight was a branch of the route from England to Australia and stopped in Saigon and Tourane in French Indochina. The RAF escorted the inaugural flight into Kai Tak, and officials including the governor of Hong Kong were present for its arrival. In April 1937, Pan Am started a flying boat service to Manila, where passengers could transfer to the transpacific route to San Francisco. The plane was renamed the Hongkong Clipper at the inauguration ceremony. Other airlines that served Kai Tak during the pre–World War II period included the China National Aviation Corporation, Eurasia and Air France. In 1938, the aerodrome handled ten thousand passengers and consisted of a grass field without runways.

=== World War II ===
Kai Tak also served as a military base, and the spectre of war with Japan led colonial officials to equip the airport with facilities such as air raid shelters and bunkers for anti-aircraft guns. Plans to add a concrete runway were thwarted when the Battle of Hong Kong commenced on 8 December 1941. Japan bombed the airfield. Various aircraft belonging to CNAC and Pan Am were struck, and those that survived were flown to Namyung, China. CNAC carried 275 people out of Hong Kong, including Soong Mei-ling, wife of the leader of Nationalist China, and Soong Ching-ling, widow of the founder of the Kuomintang. Colonial authorities destroyed equipment that the Japanese could use before evacuating from Kai Tak on 11 December. Kowloon including Kai Tak Airport fell into the hands of the Japanese the following day.

Overall, the aerodrome did not face significant damage, and the Japanese forces started to use it. An expansion project was launched in September 1942 using Allied prisoner-of-war (POW) labourers. The Japanese built two concrete runways designated 13/31 and 07/25, a control tower and hangars. (Note: Numerous POW diary entries exist recalling the gruelling work and long hours spent on the project. Former POWs also recount their attempts to sabotage construction, which included mixing large amounts of clay with the concrete for the runways.) The original terminal and homes around the airfield were demolished, and land was reclaimed. During the process, the historic wall of the Kowloon Walled City and Sacred Hill were destroyed for materials. The 45-metre (148 ft) tall Sung Wong Toi boulder, a memorial for the penultimate Song dynasty emperor that sat on the hill, was broken up. The Americans struck the airport in 1944 as construction was underway. The programme ended in 1945, more than doubling the size of the aerodrome.

=== 1945 to 1970s ===
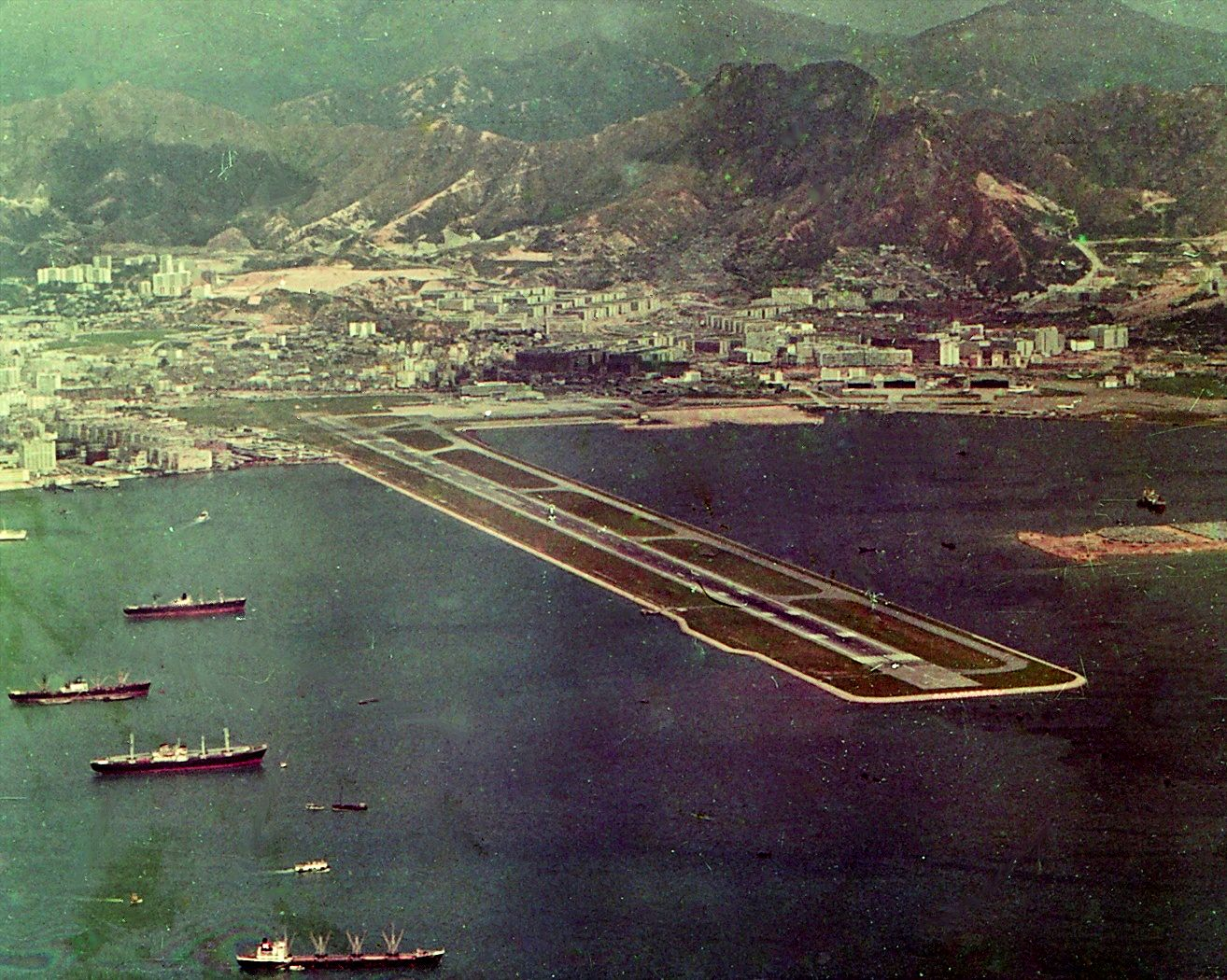
Aerial view of the airport in 1971, three years before the 1974 extension.

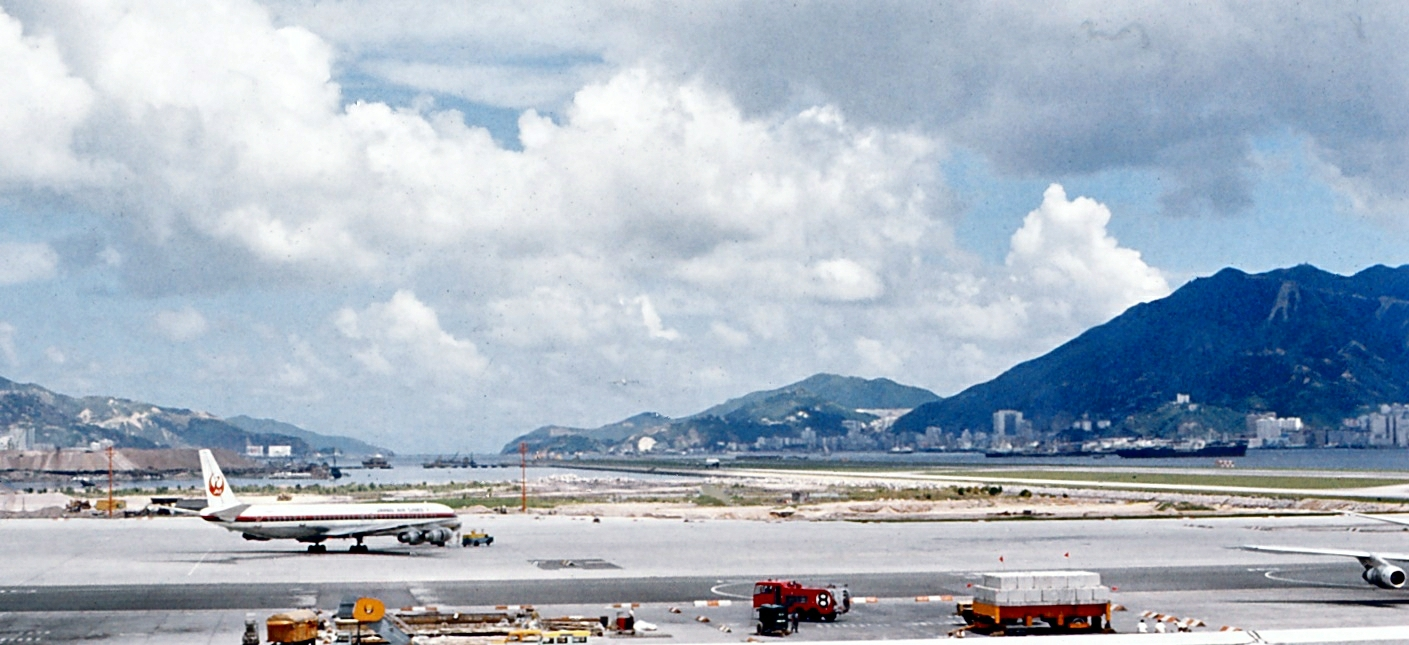
View of the airport in June 1971

It was also the location of HMS Nabcatcher, a Royal Navy Mobile Operational Naval Air Base, (MONAB) VIII, which was situated here between 1945 and 1947. At the start of April 1947, it was decommissioned, and concurrently re-commissioned as HMS Flycatcher. At the end of December, HMS Flycatcher was officially decommissioned at Kai Tak, although the Royal Navy retained lodger rights until 1978.

A plan to turn Kai Tak into a modern airport was released in 1954. The lack of space meant that the only way to add length to the existing runway was to extend it into Victoria Harbour. Dragages Hong Kong, a construction company with prior marine and dredging experience, was contracted to pursue the project. Construction began in 1955. By 1957 runway 13/31 had been extended to 1,664 metres (5,459 ft), while runway 7/25 remained 1,450 metres (4,760 ft) long; night operations were not allowed. Bristol Britannia 102s took over BOAC's London-Tokyo flights in the summer of 1957 and were the largest airliners scheduled to the old airport (Boeing Stratocruisers never flew there). In 1958 the new NW/SE 2,550-metre (8,350 ft) runway extending into Kowloon Bay was completed by land reclamation. The two old runways were removed with footprints used by the apron and terminal building. The passenger terminal was completed in 1962. The runway was extended in the mid-1970s to 3,390 metres (11,130 ft), the final length. This extension was completed in June 1974, but the full length of the runway was not in use until 31 December 1975, as construction of the new Airport Tunnel had kept the northwestern end of the runway closed.

In 1955, Kai Tak Airport was featured in the film The Night My Number Came Up.

An Instrument Guidance System (IGS) was installed in 1974 to aid landing on runway 13. Use of the airport under adverse conditions was greatly increased.

In the 1970s, the airport's increasing traffic and growth of high-density developments around it raised concerns about the potential loss of life should a crash occur, though no serious accidents happened throughout its history of operations.

=== Overcrowding in the 1980s and 1990s ===
The growth of Hong Kong also put a strain on the airport's capacity. Its usage was close to, and for some time exceeded, the designed capacity. The airport was designed to handle 24 million passengers per year, but in 1996, Kai Tak handled 29.5 million passengers, plus 1.56 million tonnes of freight, making it the third busiest airport in the world in terms of international passenger traffic, and busiest in terms of international cargo throughput. Moreover, clearance requirements for aircraft takeoffs and landings made it necessary to limit the height of buildings that could be built in Kowloon. While Kai Tak was initially located far away from residential areas, the expansion of both residential areas and the airport resulted in Kai Tak being close to residential areas. This caused serious noise and engine pollution for nearby residents and necessitated height restrictions, which were removed after Kai Tak closed. A night curfew from 11:30 pm to 6:30 am in the early morning also hindered operations.

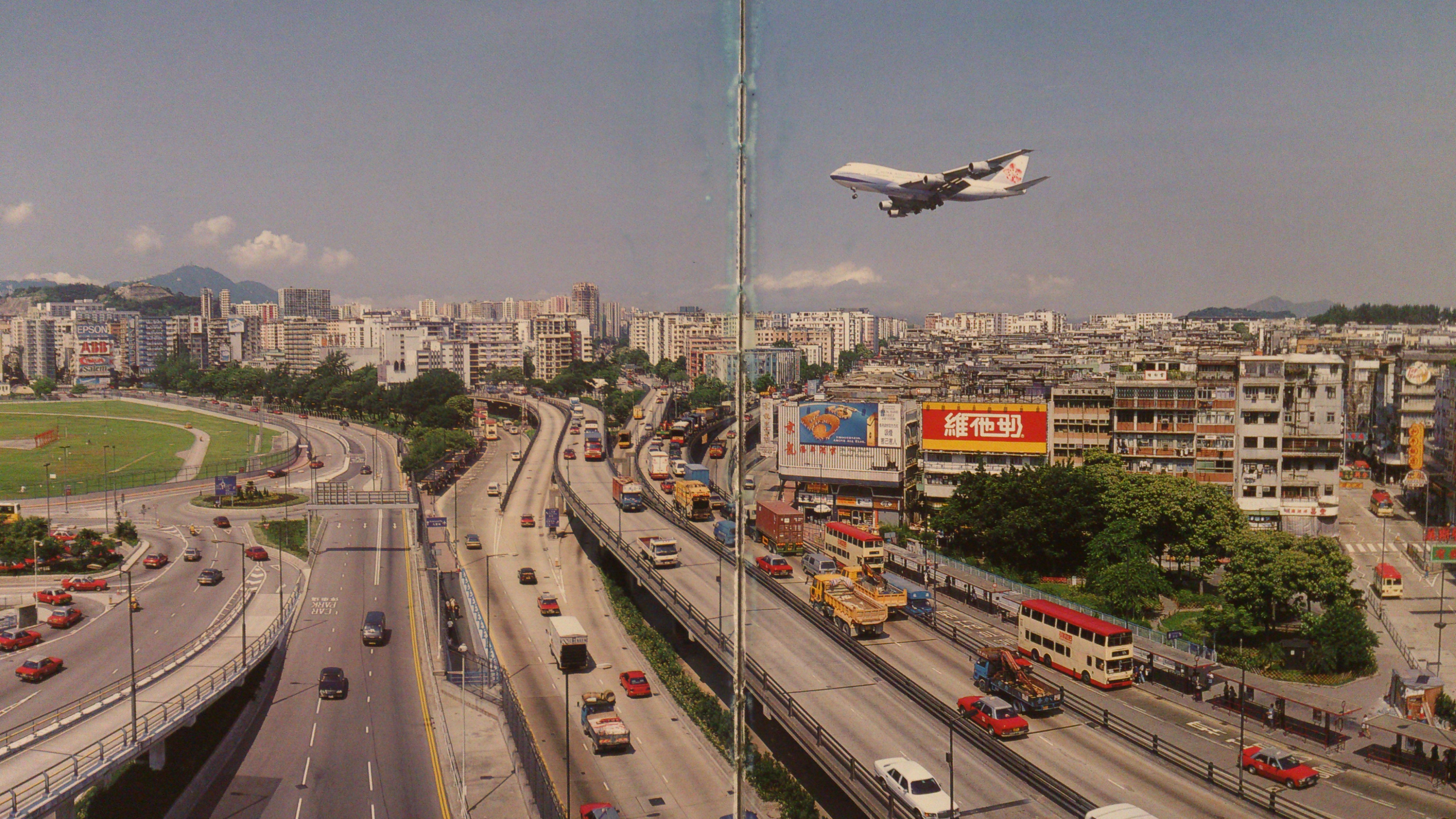
A China Airlines Boeing 747 approaching the airport in 1998

As a result, in the late 1980s, the Hong Kong Government began searching for alternative locations for a new airport in Hong Kong to replace the aging airport. After deliberating on several locations, including the south side of Hong Kong Island, the government decided to build the airport on the island of Chek Lap Kok off Lantau Island. The new airport is located far away from Hong Kong's main residential areas, conducive to minimising the dangers of a major crash and also reducing the nuisance of noise pollution. A huge number of resources were mobilised to build this new airport, part of the ten programmes in Hong Kong's Airport Core Programme.

The Regal Meridien Hong Kong Airport Hotel (now the Regal Oriental Hotel), linked to the passenger terminal by a footbridge spanning Prince Edward Road, opened on 19 July 1982. This was Hong Kong's first airport hotel and comprised 380 rooms including 47 suites. The hotel still exists, but the footbridge (which was connected to the passenger terminal) has been demolished. It is one of the few remaining buildings related to Kai Tak Airport.

=== Closure and legacy ===
The new airport in Chek Lap Kok officially opened on 6 July 1998 to replace the functions of Kai Tak Airport. All of the essential airport supplies and vehicles that were left in the old airport for operation (some of the non-essential ones had already been transported to the new airport) were transported to Chek Lap Kok in one early morning with a single massive move, with a police escort.

On the same day, at 03:30 HKT, when the first aircraft departed for Chek Lap Kok, Kai Tak was finally retired as an airport, with its ICAO and IATA airport codes reassigned to the new airport at Chek Lap Kok. Below were the final flights of Kai Tak:

- The last arrival: Dragonair KA841 from Chongqing (Airbus A320-200) landed on Runway 13 at 23:38 (11:38 p.m.)
- The last scheduled commercial flight: Cathay Pacific CX251 to London–Heathrow (Boeing 747-400) took off from Runway 13 at 00:02 (12:02 a.m.)
- The last departure: Cathay Pacific CX3340 ferry flight to the new airport at Chek Lap Kok (Airbus A340-300) took off from Runway 13 at 01:05 (1:05 a.m.)

With the ferry flight's takeoff to Chek Lap Kok, a ceremony celebrating the end of the airport was held inside the control tower, with then-director of civil aviation Richard Siegel, giving a brief speech; he ended with the words "Goodbye Kai Tak, and thank you", before dimming the lights briefly and then turning them off.

Chek Lap Kok opened at 06:00 (6:00 a.m.) on 6 July 1998 with the arrival of Cathay Pacific Flight 889 (nicknamed Polar 1) from New York–JFK. The first week of operations was disrupted by a sequence of IT failures based around software bugs in the Flight Information Display System. This in turn disrupted baggage handling and airbridge allocation. But by the end of the first week these challenges, and other teething problems, were largely resolved, and the new airport was exceeding Kai Tak performance measures. The exception was the new airport's main air cargo terminal built and operated by HACTL as a franchisee. The terminal faced major difficulties in coming into operation on 6 July, such that it closed again on 7 July to enable the franchisee to implement a major recovery programme. The disruption this caused to air cargo operations at the new airport led the government to temporarily reactivate Kai Tak's cargo terminal for a month. During this period, the airport was given temporary ICAO code VHHX.

The Kai Tak passenger terminal later housed government offices, automobile dealerships and showrooms, gaming arcades, a mall, shopping centers, a go-kart racecourse, a bowling alley, a snooker hall, a mini-golf range and other recreational facilities. In the mid-2000s, the passenger terminal and hangars were demolished. Many aviation enthusiasts were upset at the demise of Kai Tak because of the unique runway 13 approach. As private aviation was no longer allowed at Chek Lap Kok (having moved to Sek Kong Airfield), some enthusiasts had lobbied to keep about 1 km (0.62 mi) of the Kai Tak runway for general aviation, but the suggestion was rejected as the Government had planned to build a new cruise ship terminal at Kai Tak.

The Hong Kong stop of Celine Dion's Let's Talk About Love World Tour was held on the airport's apron on 25 January 1999.

Until its retirement in 2018, the name Kai Tak was one of the names used in the lists of tropical cyclone names in the northwest Pacific Ocean. Submitted by Hong Kong, it was used four times.

The BMW Hydrogen 7 was briefly test driven on the former Kai Tak apron area in 2007, while a golf course was set up at the end of Runway 31.

On 30 March 2025, Cathay Pacific flight CX8100, an Airbus A350-1000, flew over Victoria Harbour to commemorate the airport's 100th anniversary. This coincided with the last day of the 2025 Hong Kong Sevens, hosted at Kai Tak Sports Park, northwest of the former airport.

== Operations ==
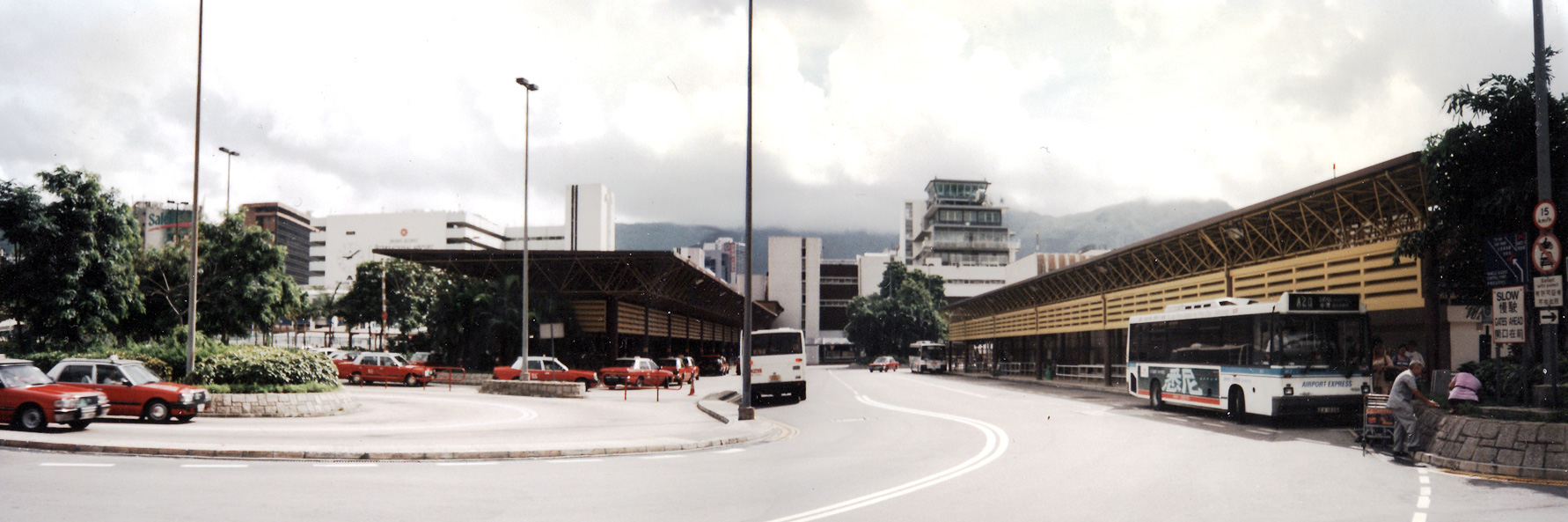
Airport forecourt

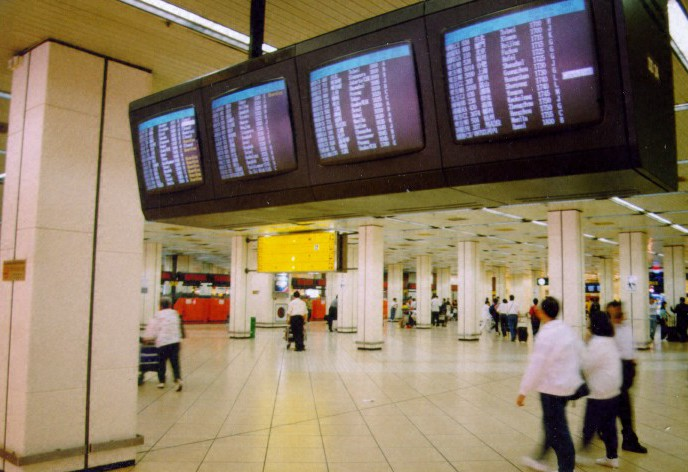
Departure hall of Kai Tak Airport.

=== Terminals and facilities ===
The Kai Tak airport consisted of a linear passenger terminal building with a car park attached at the rear. There were eight boarding gates attached to the terminal building.

A freight terminal was located on the south side of the east apron and diagonally from the passenger terminal building. Due to the limited space, the fuel tank farm was located between the passenger terminal and HAECO maintenance hangar.

=== Companies with operations at Kai Tak ===
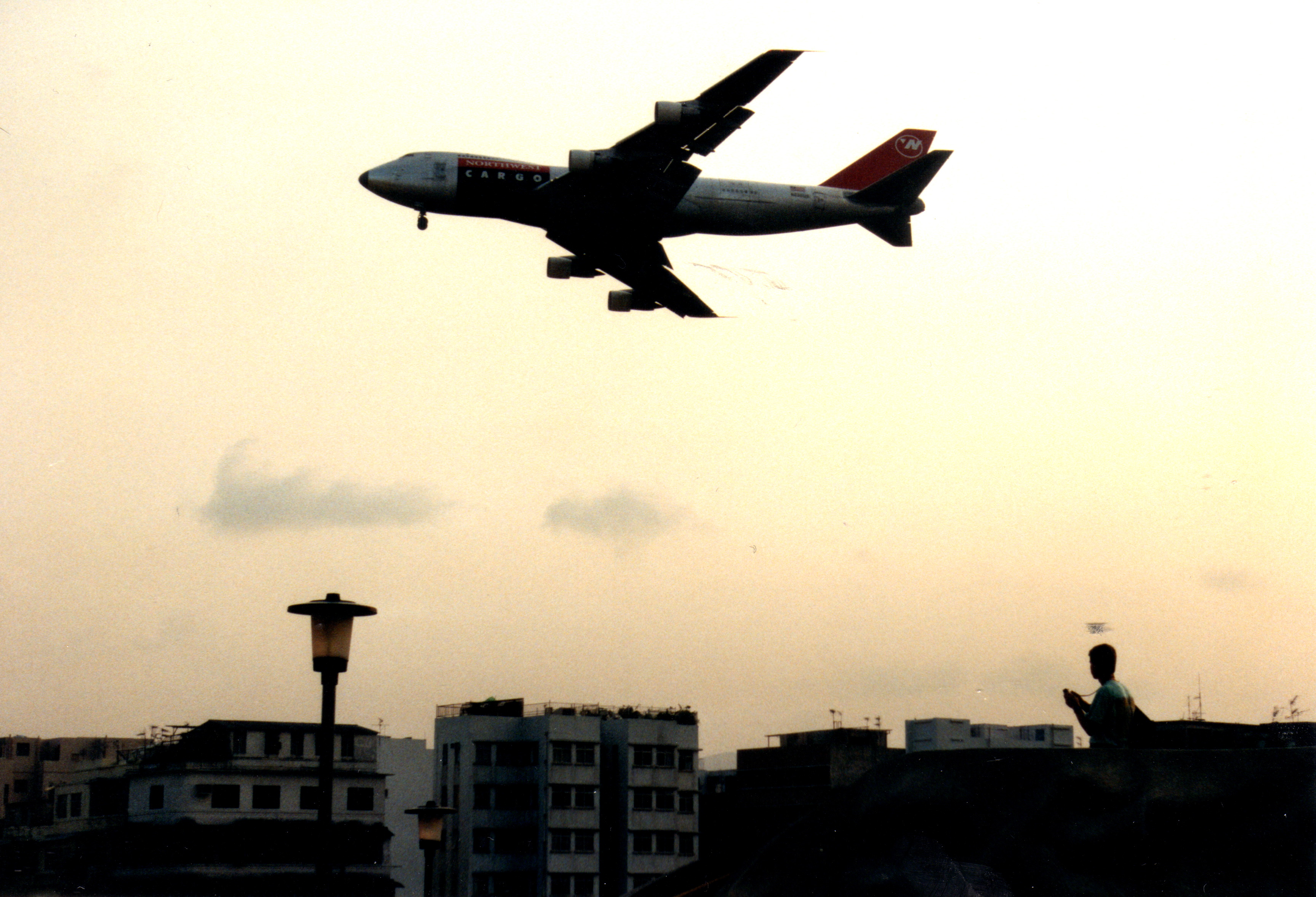
A Northwest Cargo Boeing 747-200F landing.

- Cathay Pacific operated a mixed Airbus, Boeing and some Lockheed all-wide-body fleet of one hundred aircraft from Kai Tak, providing scheduled services to the rest of Asia, Australia, New Zealand, the Middle East, Europe, South Africa and North America.
- Dragonair
- Air Hong Kong Limited
- Hong Kong Airways (until late 1950s when it was bought by Cathay Pacific)
- British Asia Airways (due to relations between PRC and ROC)

Other tenants of the airport included:

- Hong Kong Aviation Club
- Government Flying Service
- DFS Kai Tak Market
- Häagen-Dazs
- Tin Tin Restaurant

=== Runway 13 arrival ===
Layout of Kai Tak Airport prior to its 1998 closure.

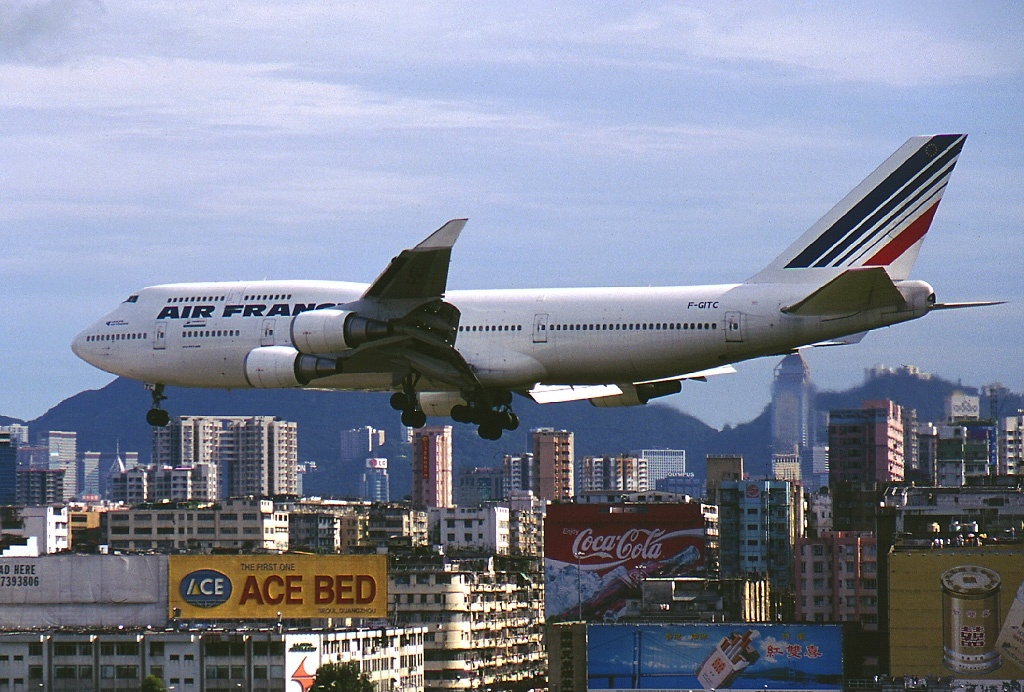
An Air France Boeing 747-400 passing above the very crowded Kowloon City during its approach and landing.

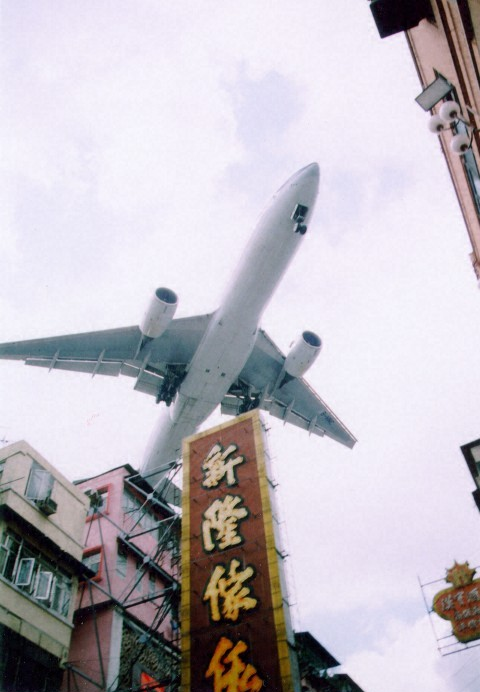
A Cathay Pacific Boeing 777-200 (B-HNC) on final approach to Kai Tak runway 13, overflying Kowloon at low altitude.

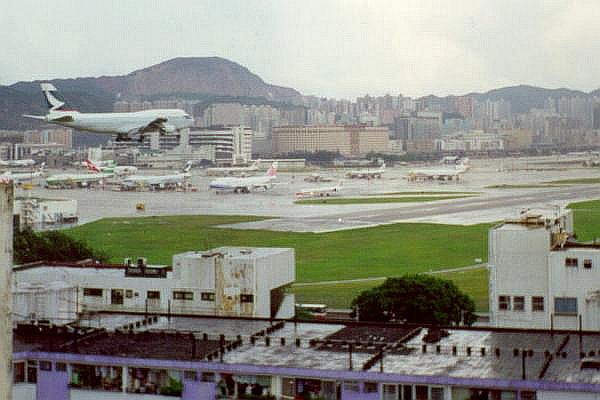
A Cathay Pacific Boeing 747-300 landing at Kai Tak Airport runway 13.

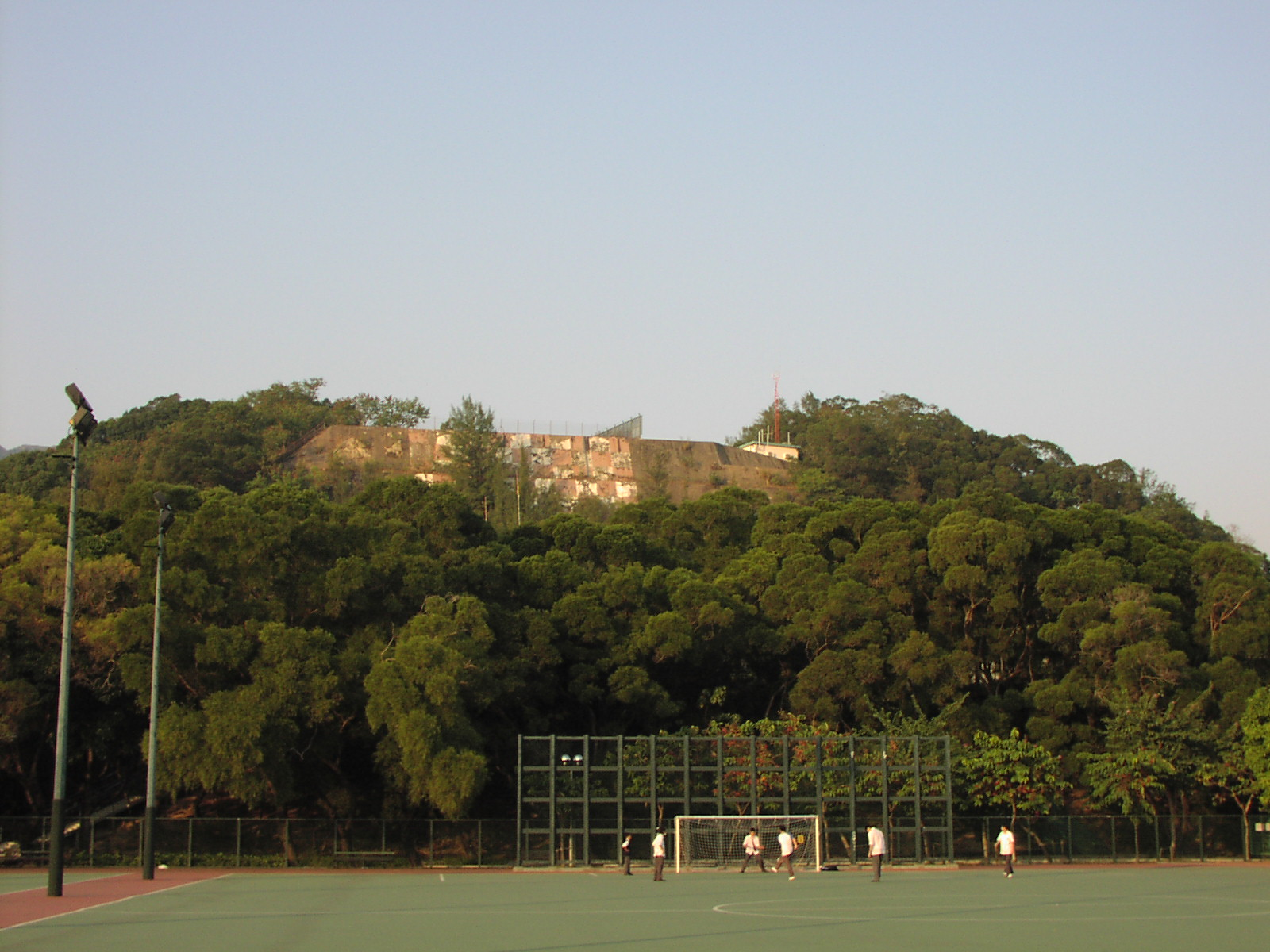
"Checkerboard Hill", which was a major navigational aid for the Runway 13 approach, as seen from Kowloon Tsai Park.

The landing approach for planes using runway 13 at Kai Tak was considered spectacular and was infamous, not just amongst aviation enthusiasts but amongst the general public as well. Flight simulator charts, based on the real charts used at the airport, give an outline of the procedures used on approach to Kai Tak Airport.

==== Checkerboard approach ====
The Checkerboard approach (also spelled as Chequerboard approach) initially begins to the south-west of the airport, with aircraft flying westbound at a minimum altitude of 6500 feet. At this beginning stage of the approach, the aircraft should be passing above Cheung Chau – a small island just off Lantau Island. After that, the aircraft was required to proceed up to "Point Golf", which was on the south side of Lantau Island and directly south of the current Chek Lap Kok Airport. Approaching aircraft then had to make a right-hand U-turn to intercept the localiser for the Runway 13 IGS, which generally happened above the current Chek Lap Kok Airport site. The IGS (abbreviation of Instrument Guidance System) was effectively a localizer type directional aid, which was offset from the runway heading by 47°, which aided aircraft by guiding them via radio signals, much like an instrument landing system. At roughly 2500 feet, the autopilot was disconnected, and the rest of the approach was flown manually. The aircraft then descended below 1000 feet and shortly afterwards reached Kowloon Tsai Park and its small hill (Checkerboard Hill). Upon reaching the small hill above Kowloon Tsai Park, which was painted with a large "aviation orange" and white checkerboard ^{(22°20′06″N 114°11′04″E)}, used as a visual reference point on the final approach (in addition to the middle marker on the Instrument Guidance System), the pilot needed to make a 47° visual right turn to line up with the runway and complete the final leg. The aircraft would be just 2 nautical miles (3.7 km) from touchdown, at a height of less than 1,000 feet (300 m) when the turn was made. Typically the plane would enter the final right turn at a height of about 650 feet (200 m) and exit it at a height of 140 feet (43 m) to line up with the runway. That demanding manoeuvre became known in the aviation community as the "Hong Kong Turn" or the "Checkerboard Turn". For many airline passengers on planes approaching and landing on Runway 13 at Kai Tak Airport, it became referred to as the "Kai Tak Heart Attack", because they were often frightened to be turning at such a proximity to the ground, which, at less than 150 ft, or 45 metres, was generally less than even the Boeing 767's wingspan, which is considered a medium-size airliner. The turn was so low that passengers could see television sets running in people's residences near the airport.

Handling the runway 13 approach was difficult enough with normal crosswinds because, even if the wind direction was constant, it was changing relative to the aircraft as the plane made the 47° visual right turn, meaning that what would be a headwind heading directly east on the IGS would become a crosswind and begin to push the aircraft over and off the runway alignment without correction. The landing would become even more challenging when crosswinds from the northeast were strong and gusty during typhoons. The mountain range northeast of the airport also made the wind vary greatly in both speed and direction. Watching large aircraft banking at low altitudes and taking big crab angles during their final approaches was popular with plane spotters. Despite the difficulty, the Runway 13 approach was used most of the time due to the prevailing wind direction in Hong Kong.

Because of the turn required during the final approach, ILS was not available for runway 13 and landings had to follow a visual approach. This made the approach unusable in low visibility conditions.

==== Stonecutters' approach ====
Alongside the Checkerboard approach, there was a lesser-known approach into Kai Tak that led aircraft over the Stonecutters' NDB at a heading of 040 and led into a ~90° turn to line up on Runway 13. This approach was used extremely infrequently, since the Chequerboard approach had a localiser and glide slope to work with, and NDBs are very rarely used in commercial aviation today. It generally can be assumed this approach was used when the localiser and glide slope were offline for maintenance.

=== Runway 13 departure ===
Runway 13 was the preferred departure runway for heavy aircraft due to the clear departure path, opposite that of the Runway 31 departure. Heavy aircraft on departure using runway 13 would often need nearly the entire length of the runway, particularly during summer days due to the air temperature.

=== Runway 31 arrival ===
Runway 31 approaches and landings were similar to other airports in which ILS was available. Runway 31 is the reciprocal of 13, i.e. it occupied the same physical space but denoted a runway facing the inverse direction, a northwesterly heading of about 310°, as opposed to about 130° for runway 13. The approach path towards the runway from the southeast passed within 300 metres (980 ft) of Heng Fa Chuen on Hong Kong Island.

Runway 31 was also used for landing early in the morning for noise abatement.

=== Runway 31 departure ===
When lined up for takeoff on runway 31, a range of hills including 1,500 feet (460 m) Beacon Hill were directly in front of the aircraft. The pilots had to make a sharp 65-degree left turn soon after takeoff to avoid the hills (i.e. the reverse of a Runway 13 landing). If a runway change occurred due to a wind change from runway 13 departures to runway 31 departures, planes that were loaded to the maximum payload for runway 13 departures had to return to the terminal to offload some goods to provide enough climbing clearance over buildings during a runway 31 departure.

=== Private aviation ===
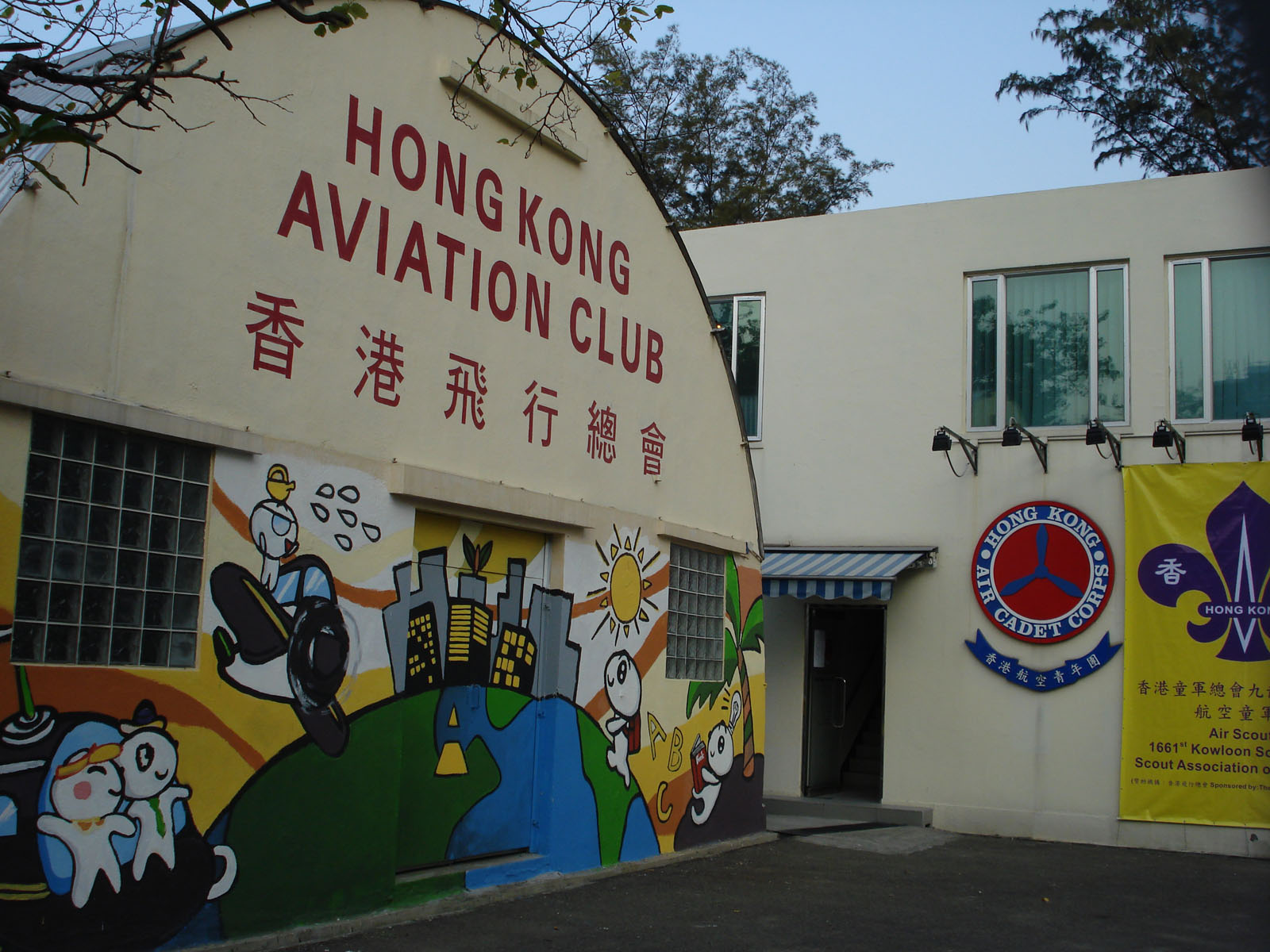
Hong Kong Aviation Club building at the former Kai Tak Airport, with the headquarters of the Hong Kong Air Cadet Corps

The Hong Kong Aviation Club formerly held most of its activities at Kai Tak, where it had hangars and other facilities.

The club moved most of its aircraft to Shek Kong Airfield in 1994 after the hours for general aviation at Kai Tak were sharply reduced, to two hours per morning, as of 1 July that year. Kai Tak closed to fixed-wing traffic in 1998. The club ended its helicopter activities at Kai Tak on 9 July 2017. The Kai Tak location, which it was able to use all days of the week, meant that helicopter training took less time compared to fixed-wing training, as usage at Shek Kong is restricted to weekends.

== Incidents and accidents ==
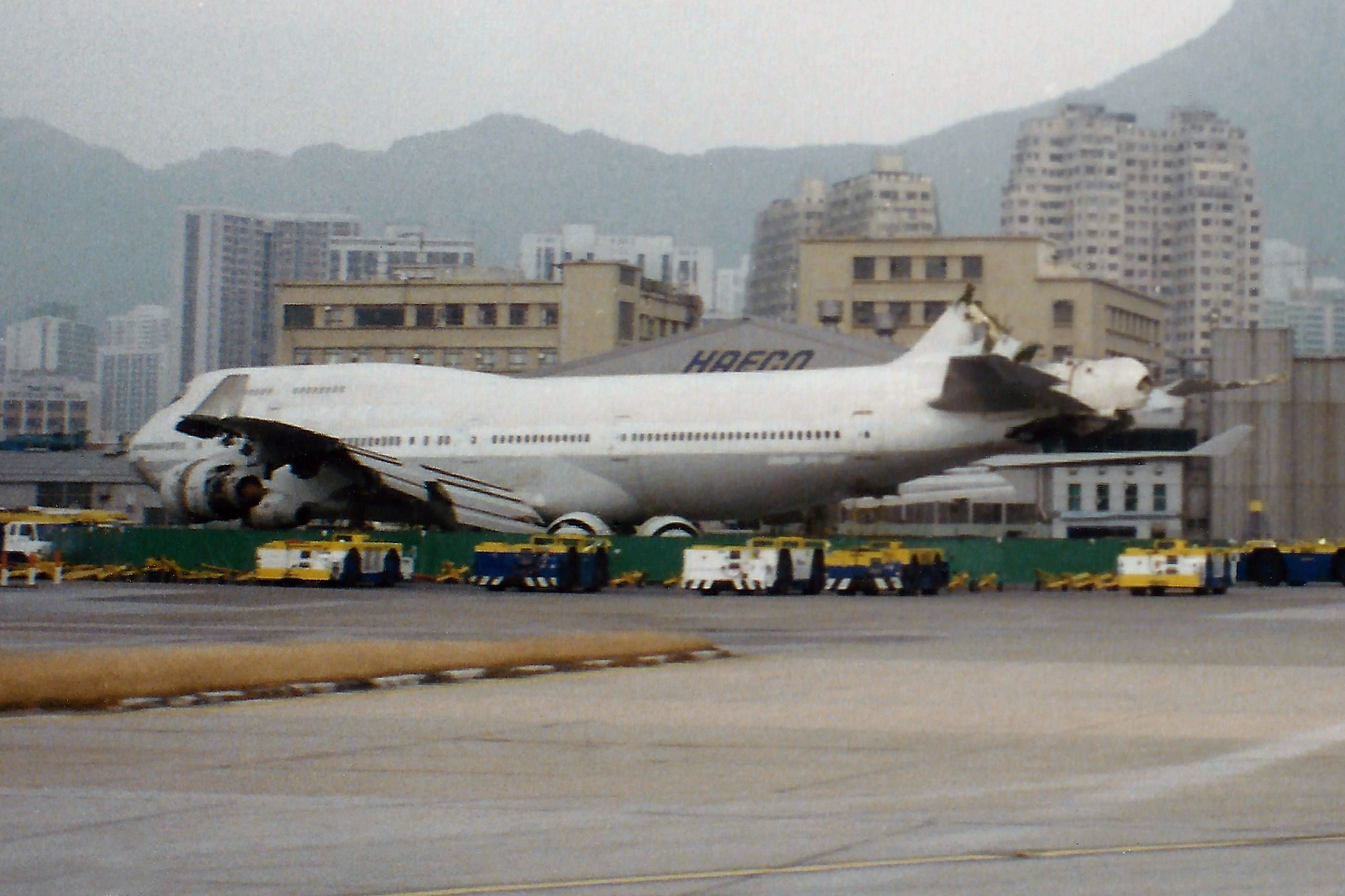
China Airlines Flight 605 crashed into Victoria Harbour after it failed to stop on the runway during a typhoon.

Many planes crashed at Kai Tak due to poor weather and hard approaches, killing 131 people from 1947 to 1994:

- On 25 January 1947, a Philippine Air Lines DC-3 aircraft crashed into Mount Parker, killing four crew members.
- On 21 December 1948, a China National Aviation Corporation Douglas DC-4 struck Basalt Island after a descent through clouds. All 35 people on board were killed.
- On 24 February 1949, a Cathay Pacific Douglas DC-3 crashed into a hillside near Braemar Reservoir after aborting an approach in poor visibility and attempting to go around. All 23 on board were killed.
- On 11 March 1951, a Pacific Overseas Airlines Douglas DC-4 crashed soon after takeoff into the hills between Mount Butler and Mount Parker on Hong Kong Island. The captain of the aircraft allegedly failed to execute the turn left operation after departure. 24 were killed.
- On 9 April 1951, a Siamese Airways Douglas DC-3 lost control of its turn while attempting a night-time visual approach. The captain allegedly allowed the aircraft to lose speed while attempting to turn quickly. 16 were killed.
- On 19 April 1961, a U.S. military Douglas DC-3 (C-47 Skytrain) bound for Formosa crashed into Mount Parker after takeoff. Of the 16 on board, 15 were killed.
- On 24 August 1965, a United States Marine Corps C-130 Hercules crashed shortly after takeoff from runway 13, killing 59 of the 71 people on board. This was the deadliest crash at Kai Tak.
- On 30 June 1967, a Thai Airways International Sud Aviation SE-210 Caravelle III crashed into Victoria Harbour while trying to land during a torrential rainstorm. A typhoon was some 150 miles (240 km) NW of Hong Kong, but the colony was not closed down in preparation for the typhoon. The co-pilot, who was flying the aircraft and unable to see the runway due to the heavy rain, allegedly made an abrupt heading change, causing the aircraft to enter a high rate of descent and crash into the harbour to the right of the runway. The starboard wing snapped off on impact, and the aircraft rolled onto its starboard side, halving the number of escape routes. 24 were killed, but only 23 bodies were recovered at the scene. The final body was recovered after it was seen floating in the harbour six weeks later.
- On 5 November 1967, Cathay Pacific Flight 033 did a runway overrun and went into the Hong Kong Harbour. 1 passenger died.
- On 2 September 1977, a Transmeridian Air Cargo Canadair CL-44 lost control and crashed into the Tathong Channel following a fire shortly after takeoff. The No. 4 engine was said to have failed, causing an internal fire in the engine and the aircraft fuel system that eventually resulted in a massive external fire. Four were killed.
- On 9 March 1978, China Airlines Flight 831 was hijacked. The hijacker (the flight engineer of the flight) demanded to be taken to Mainland China (the airline was of the Republic of China in Taiwan, not the People's Republic of China, which controlled the mainland). The hijack lasted less than a day, and the hijacker was killed.
- On 7 February 1980, a China Airlines Boeing 747-200 B-1866 (later B-18255) had a tail-strike incident while landing at Kai Tak International Airport en route to Taipei from Stockholm Arlanda Airport via Jeddah International Airport and Kai Tak. The aircraft was improperly repaired which caused it to break up in flight on 25 May 2002 while flying to Kai Tak's successor, Chek Lap Kok Airport.
- On 18 October 1983, a Lufthansa Boeing 747 freighter abandoned takeoff after engine no. 2 malfunctioned, probably at speed exceeding V_{1} (the takeoff/abort decision point). The aircraft overran the runway onto soft ground and sustained severe damage. The three crew on board suffered minor injuries.
- On 31 August 1988, the right outboard flap of a CAAC Airlines Hawker Siddeley Trident operating Flight 301 hit approach lights of runway 31 while landing under rain and fog. The right main landing gear then struck a lip and collapsed, causing the aircraft to run off the runway and slip into the harbour. 7 were killed.
- On 4 November 1993, a China Airlines Boeing 747-400, operating Flight 605, overran the runway while landing amid gale-force winds during a typhoon (Typhoon Ira). Despite the plane's unstable approach, the captain did not go around. The aircraft touched down more than 2/3 down the runway and was unable to stop before the runway ended. Although the aircraft ended up submerged beyond the end of the runway, there were only 23 minor injuries amongst the 396 passengers and crew.
- On 23 September 1994, a Lockheed L-100-30 Hercules lost control shortly after takeoff from runway 13. The pitch control system of one of its propellers was said to have failed. Six were killed.

== Redevelopment ==
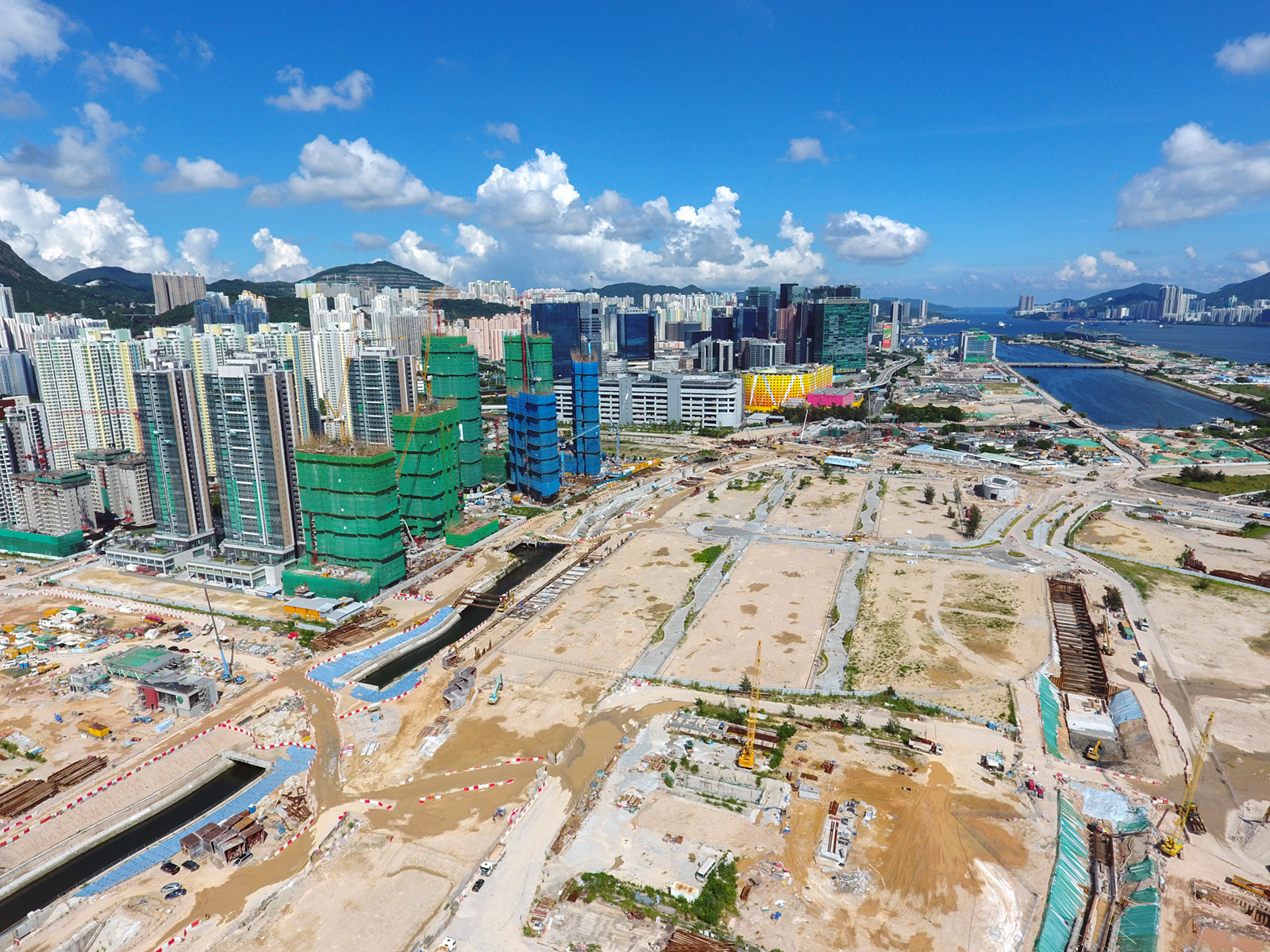
Aerial view of the Kai Tak Development site in 2017

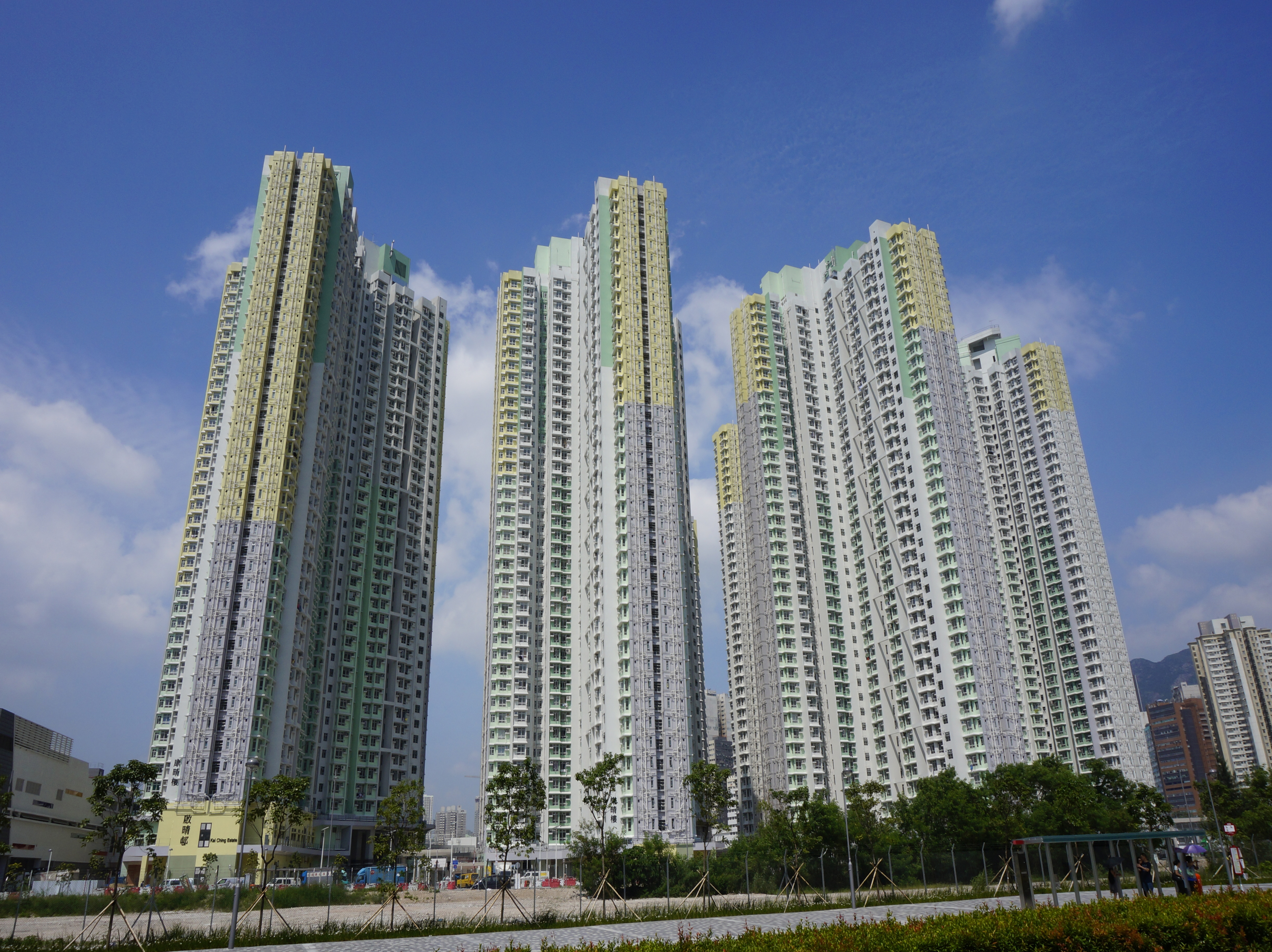
Kai Ching Estate is the first housing estate to be built on the old Kai Tak Airport site. It is located on the northeastern side of the site, where the maintenance area was located.

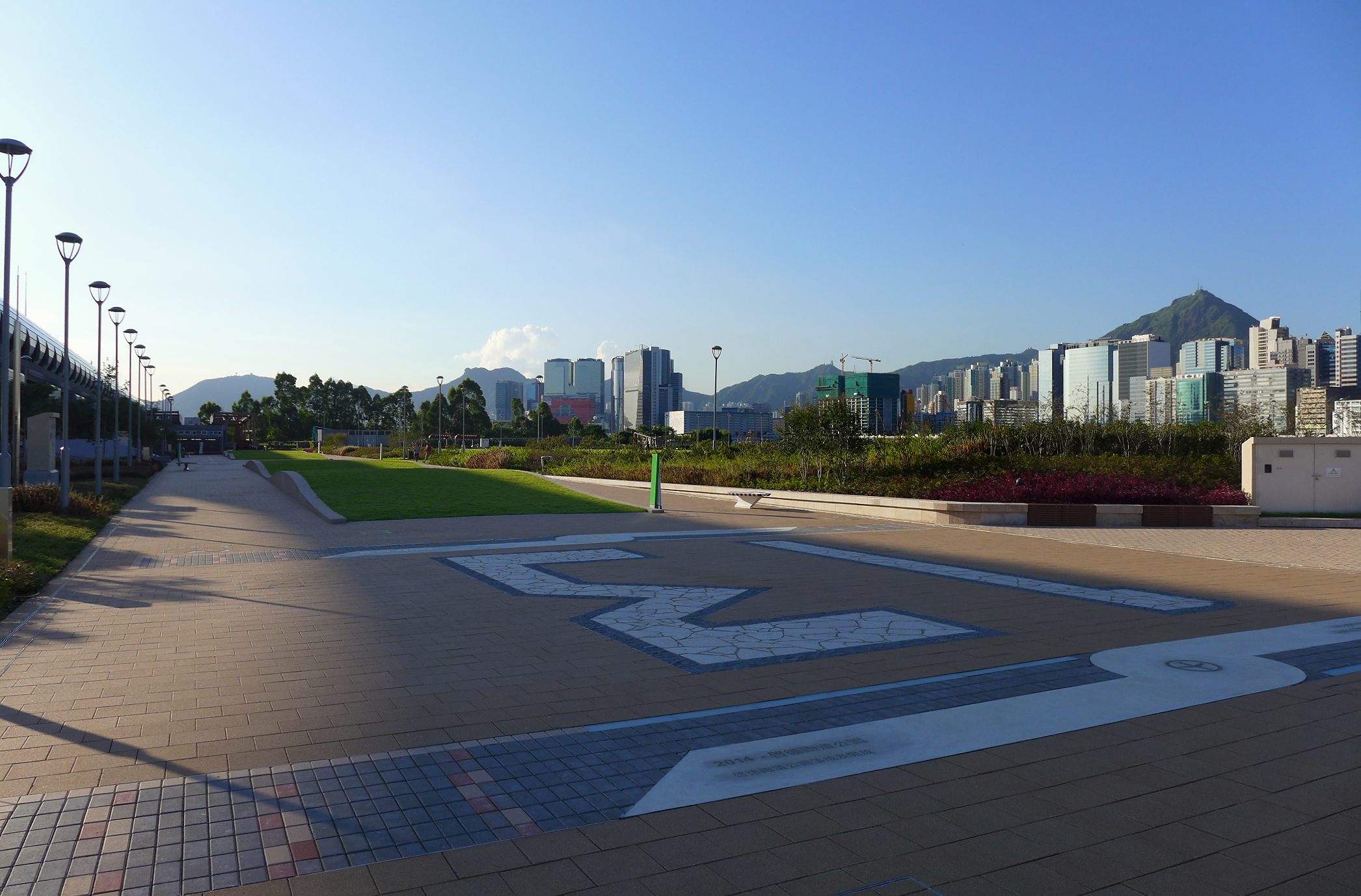
Kai Tak Runway Park with its former runway number: 13

=== 2002 blueprint ===
In October 1998, the Government drafted a plan for the Kai Tak Airport site, involving the reclamation of 219 hectares (540 acres) of land. After receiving many objections, the Government scaled down the reclamation to 166 hectares (410 acres) in June 1999. The Territorial Development Department commenced a new study on the development of the area in November 1999, entitled "Feasibility Studies on the Revised Southeast Kowloon Development Plan", and a new public consultation exercise was conducted in May 2000, resulting in the land reclamation being further scaled down to 133 hectares (330 acres). The new plans based on the feasibility studies were passed by the chief executive in July 2002. There were plans for the site of Kai Tak to be used for housing development, which was once projected to house around 240,000–340,000 residents. Due to calls from the public to protect the harbour and participate more deeply in future town planning, the scale and plan of the project were yet to be decided. There were also plans for a railway station and a maintenance centre in the proposed plan for the Sha Tin to Central Link.

There were also proposals to dredge the runway to form several islands for housing, to build a terminal capable of accommodating cruise ships the size of Queen Mary 2, and more recently, to house the Hong Kong Sports Institute, as well as several stadiums, in the case that the institute was forced to move so that the equestrian events of the 2008 Summer Olympics could be held at its present site in Sha Tin.

On 9 January 2004, the Court of Final Appeal ruled that no reclamation plan for Victoria Harbour could be introduced unless it passed an "overriding public interest" test. Subsequently, the Government abandoned these plans.

=== Kai Tak Planning Review ===
The Government set up a "Kai Tak Planning Review" in July 2004 for further public consultation. Several plans were presented.

==== June 2006 blueprint ====
A new plan for the redevelopment of Kai Tak was issued by the government in June 2006. Under these proposals, hotels would be scattered throughout the 328-hectare (810-acre) site, and flats aimed at housing 86,000 new residents were proposed.

Other features of the plan included two cruise terminals and a large stadium.

==== October 2006 blueprint ====
The Planning Department unveiled a major reworking of its plans for the old Kai Tak airport site on 17 October 2006, containing "a basket of small measures designed to answer a bevvy of concerns raised by the public". The revised blueprint will also extend several "green corridors" from the main central park into the surrounding neighbourhoods of Kowloon City, Kowloon Bay and Ma Tau Kok.

The following features were proposed:

- two cruise terminals, with a third terminal to be added if the need arises
- a luxury hotel complex near the cruise terminals—the complex would sit about seven stories high, with hotel rooms atop commercial or tourist-related spaces
- an eight-station monorail linking the tourist hub with Kwun Tong
- a large stadium
- a central park to provide green space
- a 200-metre (660 ft) high public viewing tower near the tip of the runway
- a new bridge, likely to involve further reclamation of Victoria Harbour

The following were major changes:

- hotel spaces are to be centralised near the end of the runway, and will face into the harbour towards Central
- a third cruise terminal could be added at the foot of the hotel cluster if the need arises
- a second row of luxury residential spaces is to be added facing Kwun Tong, built on an elevated terrace or platform to preserve a view of the harbour

The government promised that:

- the total amount of housing and hotel space will remain the same as proposed in June 2006
- plot ratios will be the same as before
- the total commercial space on the site will also remain about the same

The new bridge proposed by the government, joining the planned hotel district at the end of the runway with Kwun Tong, could have been a potential source of controversy. Under the Protection of the Harbour Ordinance, no harbour reclamation can take place unless the Government can demonstrate to the courts an "overriding public need".

The new Kai Tak blueprint was presented to the Legislative Council on 24 October 2006 after review by the Town Planning Board.

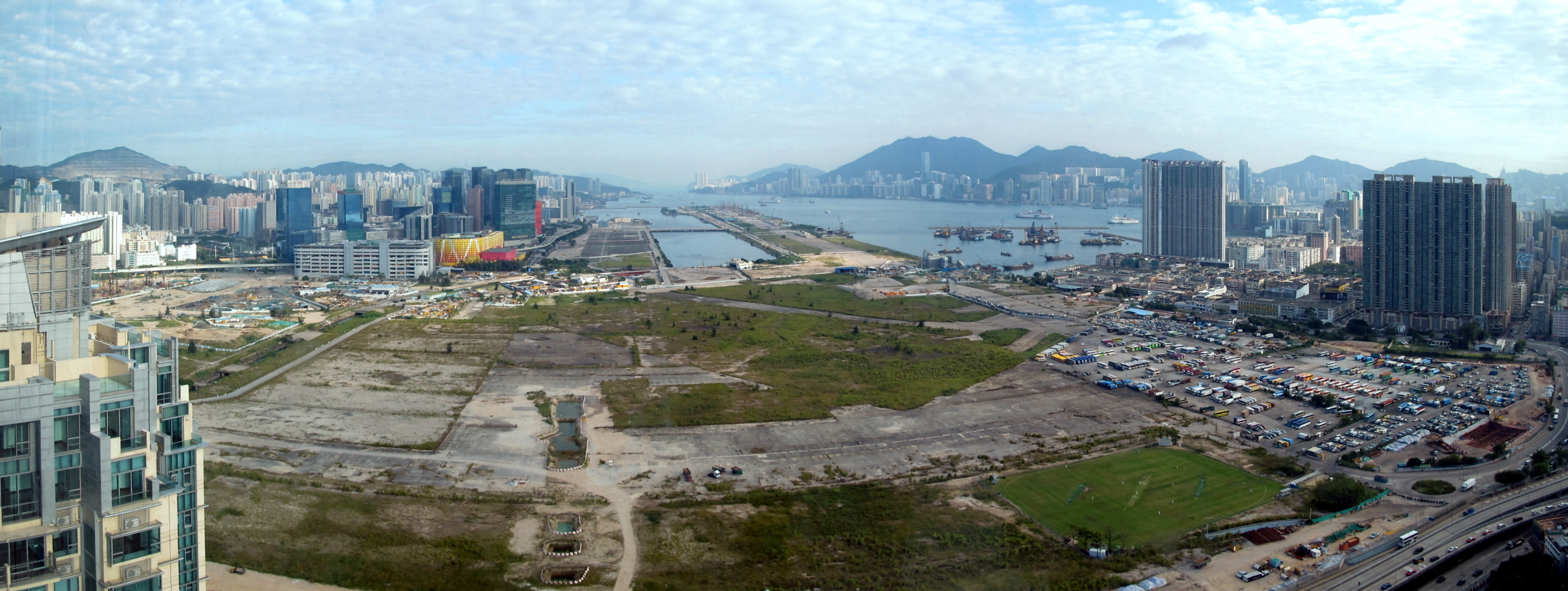
Panorama of the former Kai Tak Airport Site (2010)

=== 2011 onwards ===
In 2011, with most of the former Kai Tak area still abandoned, ideas were floated to develop the area for commercial property, citing shortages of office space and rising property costs. In June 2013, the Kai Tak Cruise Terminal was opened on the tip of the former runway. Two public housing estates opened on the northeast area of the site in 2013, providing over 13,000 new rental flats. As of 2018, the public estates have been joined by some private residential developments, now nearing completion.

A small park and a new hospital (Hong Kong Children's Hospital) which began August 2013, have 2,400 rooms, 37 operating theatres, a neuroscience centre, an oncology centre specialist, outpatient clinics with a capacity of over 1.4 million annual attendances and a community health centre.

A new Mass Transit Railway (MTR) station, Kai Tak, opened on the former airport land on 14 February 2020 for phase one of the Tuen Ma line.

Construction of the Kai Tak Sports Park on the former airport land commenced in April 2019. The sports park was officially opened in March 2025. It is the largest sports venue in Hong Kong, which the park includes a 50,000 seat main stadium, an indoor sports centre, a public sports ground and multiple open spaces.

Kai Tak Sky Garden, a massive elevated garden, opened in May 2021. It occupies part of the former runway and apron.

== See also ==
- Kai Tak Sports Park
- List of buildings and structures in Hong Kong
- List of defunct international airports
- Lung Tsun Stone Bridge
