= 2015–16 in Hong Kong football =

Football in Hong Kong
- Season: 2015–16

Men's football
- Premier League: Eastern
- First Division: Tai Po
- Second Division: Tung Sing
- Third Division: Hoi King
- Reserve Division: Biu Chun Rangers
- Senior Shield: Eastern
- FA Cup: Hong Kong Pegasus
- League Cup: Kitchee
- Season play-off: Kitchee

The 2015–16 season is the 114th season of competitive football in Hong Kong, starting in July 2015 and ending in June 2016.

== Promotion and relegation ==
=== Pre-season ===
League	Promoted to League	Relegated from league
Premier League	KC Southern District	Tai Po
First Division	Wing Yee	Happy Valley; Tuen Mun
Second Division	Tung Sing	New Fair Kuitan
Third Division	Nil	Lung Moon

== Representative team ==
=== Hong Kong national football team ===
==== 2018 FIFA World Cup qualification ====
The draw for the group stage of second round qualification was held in Kuala Lumpur, Malaysia on 14 April 2015. Hong Kong was drawn with China PR, Qatar and Maldives and Bhutan in group C. Hong Kong has started their qualifying campaign in June 2015.

Pos	Team	Pld	W	D	L	GF	GA	GD	Pts	Qualification
1	Qatar	8	7	0	1	29	4	+25	21	World Cup qualifying third round and Asian Cup
2	China	8	5	2	1	27	1	+26	17	World Cup qualifying third round and Asian Cup
3	Hong Kong	8	4	2	2	13	5	+8	14	Asian Cup qualifying third round
4	Maldives	8	2	0	6	8	20	−12	6	Asian Cup qualifying play-off round
5	Bhutan	8	0	0	8	5	52	−47	0	Asian Cup qualifying play-off round

Rules for classification: Qualification tiebreakers

3 September 2015 Matchday 3	China	0–0	Hong Kong	Shenzhen, China
19:35 UTC+8		Report (FIFA); Report (AFC)		Stadium: Bao'an Stadium (Capacity: 40,000); Attendance: 26,173; Referee: Strebre Delovski (Australia)

8 September 2015 Matchday 4	Hong Kong	2–3	Qatar	Mong Kok, Hong Kong
20:00 UTC+8	Bai He 87'; Godfred 89'	Report (FIFA); Report (AFC)	Boudiaf 22'; Hassan 62'; Musa 84'	Stadium: Mong Kok Stadium (Capacity: 6,680); Attendance: 6,396; Referee: Kim Sang-woo (South Korea)

13 October 2015 Matchday 6	Bhutan	0–1	Hong Kong	Thimphu, Bhutan
18:00 UTC+6		Report (FIFA); Report (AFC)	Chan Siu Ki 89'	Stadium: Changlimithang Stadium (Capacity: 25,000); Attendance: 7,280; Referee: Aziz Asimov (Uzbekistan)

12 November 2015 Matchday 7	Maldives	0–1	Hong Kong	Malé, Maldives
15:50 UTC+5		Report (FIFA); Report (AFC)	Paulinho 13' (pen.)	Stadium: National Football Stadium (Capacity: 11,850); Attendance: 6,000; Referee: Ammar Al-Jeneibi (United Arab Emirates)

17 November 2015 Matchday 8	Hong Kong	0–0	China	Mong Kok, Hong Kong
20:00 UTC+8		Report (FIFA); Report (AFC)		Stadium: Mong Kok Stadium (Capacity: 6,680); Attendance: 6,071; Referee: Nawaf Shukralla (Bahrain)

24 March 2016 Matchday 9	Qatar	2–0	Hong Kong	Doha, Qatar
19:00 UTC+3	Al Haidos 20'; Soria 87'	Report (FIFA); Report (AFC)		Stadium: Abdullah bin Khalifa Stadium (Capacity: 12,000); Attendance: 10,170; Referee: Dmitriy Mashentsev (Kyrgyzstan)

==== 2015 Hong Kong–Macau Interport ====
14 November 2015	Hong Kong	2–0	Macau	Siu Sai Wan, Hong Kong
15:00 UTC+8	Hui Ka Lok 64'; Chan Siu Kwan 80'	Report		Stadium: Siu Sai Wan Sports Ground; Attendance: 1,318; Referee: Lau Fong Hei

==== 2016 Guangdong–Hong Kong Cup ====
31 December 2015 1st Leg	Hong Kong	1–1	Guangdong	Mong Kok, Hong Kong
20:00 UTC+8	Tan Chun Lok 39'	Report	Cai Jingyuan 25'	Stadium: Mong Kok Stadium; Attendance: 4,273; Referee: Chan Ming Siu

3 January 2016 2nd Leg	Guangdong	4–3 (5–4 agg.)	Hong Kong	Guangzhou, Guangdong
15:30 UTC+8	Lu Lin 37' (pen.), 85'; Ye Chugui 54'; Tu Dongxu 56'	Report	Cheung Chi Yung 21'; Tam Lok Hin 33'; Itaparica 48' (pen.)	Stadium: Guangdong Provincial People's Stadium

==== 2016 AYA Bank Cup ====
3 June 2016 Semi-final	Vietnam	2–2 (4–3 p)	Hong Kong	Yangon, Myanmar
15:00 UTC+6:30	Lê Công Vinh 57', 61'	Report	McKee 48', 77'	Stadium: Thuwunna Stadium; Attendance: 8,000; Referee: Thant Zin Oo (Myanmar)
	Penalties
	Trần Nguyên Mạnh (penalty scored); Quế Ngọc Hải (penalty scored); Lương Xuân Trường (penalty scored); Hoàng Đình Tùng (penalty missed); Nguyễn Văn Quyết (penalty scored)		(penalty missed) Itaparica; (penalty scored) Sandro; (penalty scored) Leung Kwun Chung; (penalty missed) Ngue; (penalty scored) Roberto

6 June 2016 Third place match	Myanmar	3–0	Hong Kong	Yangon, Myanmar
15:00 UTC+6:30	Than Paing 22'; Maung Maung Lwin 74'; Ye Ko Oo 89'	Report		Stadium: Thuwunna Stadium; Attendance: 6,200; Referee: Mohd Amirul Izwan Bin Yaacob (Malaysia)

==== International friendlies ====
8 October 2015	Thailand	1–0	Hong Kong	Bangkok, Thailand
19:00 UTC+7	Bunmathan 90+5' (pen.)			Stadium: Rajamangala Stadium

7 November 2015	Hong Kong	5–0	Myanmar	Mong Kok, Hong Kong
17:00 UTC+8	McKee 3', 45'; Chan Siu Ki 33'; Sandro 66'; Alex 75'	Report		Stadium: Mong Kok Stadium; Attendance: 5,253

=== Hong Kong women's national football team ===
==== 2016 Women Guangdong–Hong Kong Cup ====
31 December 2015	Hong Kong	0–2	Guangdong	Kowloon Bay, Hong Kong
15:00 UTC+8			Luo Guiping 16'; Ruan Wenli 62'	Stadium: Kowloon Bay Park

== League season ==
=== Premier League ===
Pos	Team	Pld	W	D	L	GF	GA	GD	Pts	Qualification or relegation
1	Eastern	16	12	2	2	35	13	+22	38	Qualification to Champions League group stage
2	Kitchee	16	11	4	1	32	11	+21	37	Qualification to season play-off and Champions League preliminary round 2
3	South China	16	9	2	5	26	21	+5	29	Qualification to season play-off (Note: Since the winners of the Senior Shield, Eastern, and the winners of the League Cup, Kitchee, qualified for AFC competitions and the Season Play-off respectively based on league position, the spots awarded to the Senior Shield winner and the League Cup winner for the Season Play-off were awarded to the third and fourth placed team in the league. Pegasus qualified as winners of the FA Cup.)
4	Southern	16	6	5	5	26	21	+5	23	Qualification to season play-off
5	Pegasus	16	4	5	7	22	27	−5	17	Qualification to season play-off
6	Dreams Metro Gallery	16	4	4	8	19	30	−11	16	Relegation to First Division (Note: Both Dreams Metro Gallery and Wong Tai Sin did not apply for the next season's Hong Kong Premier League Licence.)
7	Yuen Long	16	3	6	7	21	32	−11	15	
8	Rangers	16	2	5	9	15	29	−14	11 (Note: Rangers wins head-to-head against Wong Tai Sin.)	
9	Wong Tai Sin	16	2	5	9	17	29	−12	11	Relegation to First Division

Source: Hong Kong Football Association
Rules for classification: 1) Points; 2) Head-to-head points; 3) Head-to-head goal difference; 4) Head-to-head goals scored; 5) Goal difference; 6) Goals scored; 7) Fair-play points; 8) Drawing lots (Play-off if the winner has to be decided)

=== First Division League ===
Pos	Team	Pld	W	D	L	GF	GA	GD	Pts	Promotion or relegation
1	Tai Po (C, P)	26	19	5	2	67	29	+38	62	Promotion to Premier League
2	HKFC (P)	26	17	6	3	66	21	+45	57	Promotion to Premier League
3	Sun Hei	26	17	5	4	64	25	+39	56	
4	Easyknit Property	26	14	5	7	66	49	+17	47	
5	Yau Tsim Mong	26	13	7	6	55	35	+20	46	
6	Citizen	26	13	6	7	55	31	+24	45	
7	Shatin	26	12	6	8	48	39	+9	42	
8	Double Flower	26	7	6	13	34	46	−12	27 (Note: Double Flower wins head-to-head against Wanchai.)	
9	Wanchai	26	8	3	15	30	56	−26	27	
10	Tai Chung	26	7	2	17	34	63	−29	23	
11	Kwai Tsing	26	4	8	14	36	59	−23	20 (Note: Kwai Tsing wins head-to-head against Kwun Tong.)	
12	Kwun Tong	26	5	5	16	21	52	−31	20	
13	Sun Source (R)	26	5	4	17	26	58	−32	19 (Note: Metro Gallery Sun Source ahead of Lucky Mile on goal difference.)	Relegation to Second Division
14	Lucky Mile (R)	26	5	4	17	28	67	−39	19	Relegation to Second Division

Source: Hong Kong Football Association
Rules for classification: 1) Points; 2) Head-to-head points; 3) Head-to-head goal difference; 4) Head-to-head goals scored; 5) Goal difference; 6) Goals scored; 7) Fair-play points; 8) Drawing lots
(C) Champions; (P) Promoted; (R) Relegated

=== Second Division League ===
Pos	Team	Pld	W	D	L	GF	GA	GD	Pts	Promotion or relegation
1	Tung Sing (C, P)	22	16	3	3	56	27	+29	51	Promotion to First Division
2	Eastern District (P)	22	15	4	3	65	23	+42	49	Promotion to First Division
3	Sparta Rotterdam Mutual	22	13	6	3	39	18	+21	45	
4	Sham Shui Po	22	13	4	5	32	22	+10	43	
5	Kwong Wah	22	9	3	10	29	34	−5	30	
6	Sai Kung	22	7	7	8	31	29	+2	28	
7	Kwok Keung	22	6	8	8	27	32	−5	26	
8	Kowloon City	22	7	5	10	27	30	−3	26	
9	Tuen Mun	22	7	2	13	33	52	−19	23	
10	Tuen Mun FC	22	4	6	12	32	49	−17	18	
11	Tsuen Wan (R)	22	4	4	14	30	49	−19	16	Relegation to Third Division
12	Happy Valley (R)	22	2	6	14	15	51	−36	12	Relegation to Third Division

Source: Hong Kong Football Association
Rules for classification: 1) Points; 2) Head-to-head points; 3) Head-to-head goal difference; 4) Head-to-head goals scored; 5) Goal difference; 6) Goals scored; 7) Fair-play points; 8) Drawing lots
(C) Champions; (P) Promoted; (R) Relegated

=== Third Division League ===
Pos	Team	Pld	W	D	L	GF	GA	GD	Pts	Promotion or relegation
1	Hoi King (C, P)	30	26	1	3	77	19	+58	79 (Note: Hoi King wins head-to-head against Central & Western.)	Promotion to Second Division
2	Central & Western (P)	30	25	4	1	101	11	+90	79	Promotion to Second Division
3	St. Joseph's	30	17	9	4	63	24	+39	60	
4	REX Global North District	30	18	2	10	65	46	+19	56	
5	KCDRSC	30	17	3	10	59	46	+13	54	
6	Wing Go Fu Moon	30	16	5	9	58	44	+14	53	
7	GFC Friends	30	15	3	12	60	33	+27	48	
8	Sun International	30	13	7	10	44	41	+3	46	
9	Fukien	30	11	8	11	54	49	+5	41	
10	Ornament	30	12	4	14	47	56	−9	40	
11	Telecom	30	8	8	14	45	62	−17	32	
12	Islands	30	9	4	17	38	61	−23	31	
13	New Fair Kui Tan	30	6	8	16	39	59	−20	26	
14	King Mountain	30	6	2	22	29	94	−65	20	
15	Kowloon Cricket Club (E)	30	4	2	24	34	76	−42	14	Elimination from League
16	HKFYG (E)	30	1	2	27	16	108	−92	5	Elimination from League

Source: Hong Kong Football Association
Rules for classification: 1) Points; 2) Head-to-head points; 3) Head-to-head goal difference; 4) Head-to-head goals scored; 5) Goal difference; 6) Goals scored; 7) Fair-play points; 8) Drawing lots
(C) Champions; (E) Eliminated; (P) Promoted

== Cup Competitions ==
=== Community Cup ===
20 September 2015
17:30 UTC+8

Kitchee	0–2	South China
	Report	Itaparica 32'; Sean Tse 72'

Mong Kok Stadium, Mong Kok, Hong Kong
Attendance: 4,226
Referee: Ng Chiu Kok

=== Senior Shield ===
24 January 2016
15:00 UTC+8
Final

Kwoon Chung Southern	0–2	Eastern
	Report	Xu Deshuai 61'; Barisic 85'

Hong Kong Stadium, So Kon Po, Hong Kong
Attendance: 4,557
Referee: Liu Kwok Man

=== League Cup ===
9 April 2016
15:00 UTC+8
Final

Kitchee	3–0	South China
Alex 4', 65'; Rufino 58' (pen.)	Report

Mong Kok Stadium, Mong Kok, Hong Kong
Attendance: 4,616
Referee: Ho Wai Sing

=== FA Cup ===
15 May 2016
15:00 UTC+8
Final

Hong Kong Pegasus	1–1 (a.e.t.)	Yuen Long
Ranđelović 67'	Report	Adrović 74'
Penalties
Adrović (penalty scored); João Emir (penalty scored); Eduardo (penalty scored); Tan Chun Lok (penalty missed); Wong Wai (penalty scored)	4–3	(penalty scored) Ranđelović; (penalty scored) Yip Tsz Chun; (penalty scored) Luciano; (penalty missed) Yuan Yang; (penalty missed) Gustavo

Hong Kong Stadium, So Kon Po, Hong Kong Island
Attendance: 4,190
Referee: Lau Fong Hei

=== Sapling Cup ===
18 May 2016
20:00 UTC+8
Final

South China	1–1 (a.e.t.)	Hong Kong Pegasus
Sean Tse 90+4'	Report	Adrović 90+3'
Penalties
Griffiths (penalty scored); Awal (penalty missed); Law Hiu Chung (penalty missed); Mora (penalty missed)	1–3	(penalty scored) Adrović; (penalty scored) Dhiego; (penalty scored) Eduardo; (penalty missed) Cheng Lai Hin

Mong Kok Stadium, Mong Kok, Hong Kong
Attendance: 2,150
Referee: Liu Kwok Man

=== Season play-off ===
28 May 2015
15:00 UTC+8

Kwoon Chung Southern	0–2	Kitchee
	Report	Akande 32'; Lam Ka Wai 89'

Mong Kok Stadium, Mong Kok, Hong Kong
Attendance: 1,495
Referee: Ho Wai Sing
