= 2015–16 Hong Kong FA Cup preliminary round =

Tournament details
- Country: Hong Kong
- Teams: 42

Final positions
- Champions: Sun Hei (1st title)
- Runners-up: Tai Po
- Third place: Wanchai
- Fourth place: Easyknit Property

Tournament statistics
- Matches played: 42
- Goals scored: 167 (3.98 per match)

The 2015–16 Hong Kong FA Cup preliminary round is the 41st edition of the Hong Kong FA Cup and the 3rd edition of the Hong Kong FA Cup preliminary round. 42 teams from the Hong Kong First Division League, the Hong Kong Second Division League and the Hong Kong Third Division League competed in the preliminary round. The top 3 teams from the preliminary round (Sun Hei, Tai Po, Wanchai) qualified for the First Round proper in the 2015–16 Hong Kong FA Cup.

== Participating teams ==
Hong Kong First Division League (14 teams):

- Citizen
- Double Flower
- Hong Kong FC
- Kwai Tsing
- Kwun Tong
- Lucky Mile
- Metro Gallery Sun Source
- Shatin
- Sun Hei
- Tai Chung
- Tai Po
- Wanchai
- Easyknit Property
- Yau Tsim Mong

Hong Kong Second Division League (12 teams):

- Eastern District
- Happy Valley
- Kowloon City
- Kwok Keung
- Kwong Wah
- Sai Kung
- Sham Shui Po
- Sparta Rotterdam Mutual
- Tsuen Wan
- Tuen Mun
- Tuen Mun FC
- Tung Sing

Hong Kong Third Division League (16 teams):

- Central & Western
- Fukien
- GFC Friends
- Hoi King
- Islands
- King Mountain
- KCDRSC
- Kowloon Cricket Club
- New Fair Kui Tan
- Ornament
- Telecom
- REX Global North District
- St. Joseph's
- Sun International
- HKFYG
- Wing Go Fu Moon

== Fixtures and results ==
=== Round 1 ===
13 December 2015 M1	King Mountain (4)	1–2	Sai Kung (3)	Tai Po, New Territories
13:30 (UTC+8)		Report		Stadium: Tai Po Sports Ground

13 December 2015 M2	Fukien (4)	1–0	GFC Friends (4)	Tuen Mun, New Territories
13:30 (UTC+8)		Report		Stadium: Wu Shan Recreation Playground

13 December 2015 M3	Happy Valley (3)	2–2 (5–4 p)	Wing Go Fu Moon (4)	Tin Shui Wai, New Territories
13:30 (UTC+8)		Report		Stadium: Tin Yip Road Park

13 December 2015 M4	New Fair Kui Tan (4)	0–11	Eastern District (3)	Tin Shui Wai, New Territories
15:30 (UTC+8)		Report		Stadium: Tin Yip Road Park

13 December 2015 M5	Sun International (4)	0–1	Kowloon City (3)	Diamond Hill, Kowloon
13:30 (UTC+8)		Report		Stadium: Po Kong Village Road Park Pitch #1

13 December 2015 M6	Kwok Keung (3)	0–2	St. Joseph's (4)	Diamond Hill, Kowloon
13:30 (UTC+8)		Report		Stadium: Po Kong Village Road Park Pitch #2

13 December 2015 M7	Sham Shui Po (3)	9–4	Islands (4)	Ma On Shan, New Territories
13:30 (UTC+8)		Report		Stadium: Ma On Shan Recreation Ground

13 December 2015 M8	Kowloon Cricket Club (4)	2–4	REX Global North District (4)	Kowloon City, Kowloon
13:30 (UTC+8)		Report		Stadium: Kowloon Tsai Park #1

13 December 2015 M9	Sparta Rotterdam Mutual (3)	3–0	Tuen Mun (3)	Kowloon City, Kowloon
15:30 (UTC+8)		Report		Stadium: Kowloon Tsai Park #1

13 December 2015 M10	Tsuen Wan (3)	3–0	Ornament (4)	Sham Shui Po, Kowloon
13:30 (UTC+8)		Report		Stadium: Tai Hang Tung Recreation Ground #2

=== Round 2 ===
20 December 2015 M11	HKFYG (4)	0–3	Lucky Mile (2)	Tin Shui Wai, New Territories
13:30 (UTC+8)		Report		Stadium: Tin Yip Road Park

20 December 2015 M12	Hoi King (4)	4–1	Sai Kung (3)	Tin Shui Wai, New Territories
15:30 (UTC+8)		Report		Stadium: Tin Yip Road Park

20 December 2015 M13	Tai Po (2)	9–0	Fukien (4)	Tuen Mun, New Territories
13:30 (UTC+8)		Report		Stadium: Wu Shan Recreation Playground

20 December 2015 M14	Shatin (2)	5–1	Happy Valley (3)	Tuen Mun, New Territories
15:30 (UTC+8)		Report		Stadium: Wu Shan Recreation Playground

20 December 2015 M15	Metro Gallery Sun Source (2)	1–1 (1–3 p)	Eastern District (3)	Diamond Hill, Kowloon
13:00 (UTC+8)		Report		Stadium: Po Kong Village Road Park Pitch #1

20 December 2015 M16	Double Flower (2)	6–1	Kowloon City (3)	Diamond Hill, Kowloon
15:00 (UTC+8)		Report		Stadium: Po Kong Village Road Park Pitch #1

20 December 2015 M17	Easyknit Property (2)	1–0	Citizen (2)	Diamond Hill, Kowloon
13:00 (UTC+8)		Report		Stadium: Po Kong Village Road Park Pitch #2

20 December 2015 M18	Kwong Wah (3)	0–0 (5–6 p)	Hong Kong FC (2)	Diamond Hill, Kowloon
15:00 (UTC+8)		Report		Stadium: Po Kong Village Road Park Pitch #2

20 December 2015 M19	Central & Western (4)	6–0	KCDRSC (4)	Kowloon City, Kowloon
13:30 (UTC+8)		Report		Stadium: Kowloon Tsai Park #1

20 December 2015 M20	Wanchai (2)	3–1	St. Joseph's (4)	Kowloon City, Kowloon
15:30 (UTC+8)		Report		Stadium: Kowloon Tsai Park #1

20 December 2015 M21	Tai Chung (2)	3–2	Sham Shui Po (3)	Ma On Shan, New Territories
13:30 (UTC+8)		Report		Stadium: Ma On Shan Sports Ground

20 December 2015 M22	Telecom (4)	1–2	REX Global North District (4)	Ma On Shan, New Territories
15:30 (UTC+8)		Report		Stadium: Ma On Shan Sports Ground

20 December 2015 M23	Kwun Tong (2)	0–2	Sparta Rotterdam Mutual (3)	Sha Tin, New Territories
13:30 (UTC+8)		Report		Stadium: Sha Tin Sports Ground

20 December 2015 M24	Kwai Tsing (2)	5–1	Tsuen Wan (3)	Sha Tin, New Territories
15:30 (UTC+8)		Report		Stadium: Sha Tin Sports Ground

20 December 2015 M25	Tung Sing (3)	5–1	Tuen Mun FC (3)	Sham Shui Po, Kowloon
13:30 (UTC+8)		Report		Stadium: Tai Hang Tung Recreation Ground #2

20 December 2015 M26	Sun Hei (2)	0–0 (4–3 p)	Yau Tsim Mong (2)	Sham Shui Po, Kowloon
15:30 (UTC+8)		Report		Stadium: Tai Hang Tung Recreation Ground #2

=== Round 3 ===
27 December 2015 M27	Lucky Mile (2)	1–1 (2–4 p)	Hoi King (4)	Tin Shui Wai, New Territories
13:30 (UTC+8)		Report		Stadium: Tin Yip Road Park

27 December 2015 M28	Tai Po (2)	4–0	Shatin (2)	Tin Shui Wai, New Territories
15:30 (UTC+8)		Report		Stadium: Tin Yip Road Park

27 December 2015 M29	Eastern District (3)	1–2	Double Flower (2)	Tuen Mun, New Territories
13:30 (UTC+8)		Report		Stadium: Wu Shan Recreation Playground

27 December 2015 M30	Easyknit Property (2)	3–3 (5–3 p)	Hong Kong FC (2)	Tuen Mun, New Territories
15:30 (UTC+8)		Report		Stadium: Wu Shan Recreation Playground

27 December 2015 M31	Central & Western (4)	1–2	Wanchai (2)	Diamond Hill, Kowloon
13:00 (UTC+8)		Report		Stadium: Po Kong Village Road Park Pitch #1

27 December 2015 M32	Tai Chung (2)	1–0	REX Global North District (4)	Diamond Hill, Kowloon
15:00 (UTC+8)		Report		Stadium: Po Kong Village Road Park Pitch #1

27 December 2015 M33	Sparta Rotterdam Mutual (3)	1–1 (5–4 p)	Kwai Tsing (2)	Diamond Hill, Kowloon
13:00 (UTC+8)		Report		Stadium: Po Kong Village Road Park Pitch #2

27 December 2015 M34	Tung Sing (3)	0–1	Sun Hei (2)	Diamond Hill, Kowloon
15:00 (UTC+8)		Report		Stadium: Po Kong Village Road Park Pitch #2

=== Quarter-finals ===
10 January 2016 M35	Hoi King (4)	0–9	Tai Po (2)	Tin Shui Wai, New Territories
13:30 (UTC+8)		Report		Stadium: Tin Yip Road Park

10 January 2016 M36	Double Flower (2)	0–1	Easyknit Property (2)	Tin Shui Wai, New Territories
15:30 (UTC+8)		Report		Stadium: Tin Yip Road Park

10 January 2016 M37	Wanchai (2)	1–0	Tai Chung (2)	Tsing Yi, New Territories
13:30 (UTC+8)		Report		Stadium: Tsing Yi Northeast Park

10 January 2016 M38	Sparta Rotterdam Mutual (3)	0–3	Sun Hei (2)	Tsing Yi, New Territories
15:30 (UTC+8)		Report		Stadium: Tsing Yi Northeast Park

=== Semi-finals ===
17 January 2016 M39	Tai Po (2)	5–1	Easyknit Property (2)	Tin Shui Wai, New Territories
13:30 (UTC+8)		Report		Stadium: Tin Yip Road Park

17 January 2016 M40	Wanchai (2)	1–5	Sun Hei (2)	Tin Shui Wai, New Territories
15:30 (UTC+8)		Report		Stadium: Tin Yip Road Park

=== 3rd Place ===
24 January 2016 M41	Easyknit Property (2)	2–2 (3–4 p)	Wanchai (2)	Tin Shui Wai, New Territories
13:30 (UTC+8)		Report		Stadium: Tin Yip Road Park

=== Final ===
24 January 2016 M42	Tai Po (2)	1–2	Sun Hei (2)	Tin Shui Wai, New Territories
15:30 (UTC+8)		Report		Stadium: Tin Yip Road Park
