= 2013–14 Hong Kong FA Cup preliminary round =

Tournament details
- Country: Hong Kong
- Teams: 37

Final positions
- Champions: Metro Gallery Sun Source (1st title)
- Runners-up: Kwai Tsing

Tournament statistics
- Matches played: 35
- Goals scored: 152 (4.34 per match)

The 2013–14 Hong Kong FA Cup preliminary round is the 39th edition of the Hong Kong FA Cup and the 1st edition of the Hong Kong FA Cup preliminary round. It will be the first time since the 2008–09 edition that lower divisions teams are involved in the competition. 4 teams from the preliminary round will be qualified for the proper round. The involvement of clubs from lower divisions means that the competition starts with a number of preliminary rounds. The 4 teams that reach preliminary semi-finals are qualified for the First Round proper of the 2013–14 Hong Kong FA Cup.

== Calendar ==
The calendar for the 2013–14 Hong Kong FA Cup preliminary round, as announced by the Hong Kong Football Association.

Round	Main date	Number of fixtures	Clubs	New entries this round
First Round	8 December 2013	5	37 → 32	10
Second Round	8 & 15 December 2013	16	32 → 16	27
Third Round	22 December 2013	8	16 → 8	None
Quarter-finals	29 December 2013	4	8 → 4	None
Semi-finals	5 January 2014	4	N/A^{1}	None
3rd-place playoff	12 January 2014	4	N/A^{1}	None
Final	12 January 2014	4	N/A^{1}	None

Note:
^{1} 4 teams that reach preliminary semi-finals are qualified for the proper round of the cup. Therefore, the 3rd place playoff and the final do not affect the number of clubs remaining.

== First round ==
10 out of 37 teams are randomly drawn and required to compete starting from the first round, while other 27 teams will start from the second round. The eight matches will all be played on 8 December 2013.

8 December 2013	Metro Gallery Sun Source (3)	7 – 1	Lung Moon (4)	Happy Valley, Hong Kong Island
13:30 UTC+8		Report		Stadium: Happy Valley Recreation Ground #6

8 December 2013	New Fair Kuitan (3)	1 – 0	Wong Tai Sin (2)	Wong Tai Sin, Kowloon
13:00 UTC+8		Report		Stadium: Po Kong Village Road Park #2

8 December 2013	Double Flower (2)	5 – 0	Fire Services (3)	Wong Tai Sin, Kowloon
13:00 UTC+8		Report		Stadium: Po Kong Village Road Park #1

8 December 2013	Wofoo Tai Po (2)	3 – 0	Tsuen Wan (3)	Wong Tai Sin, Kowloon
15:00 UTC+8		Report		Stadium: Po Kong Village Road Park #1

8 December 2013	Central & Western (4)	8 – 2	Telecom (3)	Happy Valley, Hong Kong Island
15:30 UTC+8		Report		Stadium: Happy Valley Recreation Ground #6

== Second round ==
The second round draw included 5 first round winners and 27 teams that is not required to play in the first round. All second round matches will be played on 8 and 15 December 2013.

8 December 2013	Yau Tsim Mong (3)	5 − 0	GFC Friends (4)	Tsing Yi, New Territories
13:30(GMT+8)		Report		Stadium: Tsing Yi Northeast Park

8 December 2013	Sai Kung (4)	2 – 5	Sham Shui Po (3)	Ma On Shan, Hong Kong Island
13:30(GMT+8)		Report		Stadium: Ma On Shan Recreation Ground

8 December 2013	North District (4)	0 – 5	Kwong Wah (3)	Tai Po, New Territories
13:30(GMT+8)		Report		Stadium: Kwong Fuk Park

8 December 2013	Tung Sing (4)	0 – 4	Tai Chung (2)	Kowloon City, Kowloon
13:30(GMT+8)		Report		Stadium: Kowloon Tsai Park #1

8 December 2013	Solon (4)	0 – 6	Wanchai (2)	Causeway Bay, Hong Kong Island
13:30(GMT+8)		Report		Stadium: Causeway Bay Sports Ground

8 December 2013	Kwai Tsing (2)	4 – 1	KCDRSC (3)	Tsing Yi, New Territories
15:30(GMT+8)		Report		Stadium: Tsing Yi Northeast Park

8 December 2013	St. Joseph's (4)	1 – 3	Hong Kong FC (2)	Wong Tai Sin, Kowloon
13:00(GMT+8)		Report		Stadium: Po Kong Village Road Park #2

8 December 2013	Fu Moon (3)	0 – 5	Tuen Mun FC (2)	Ma On Shan, Hong Kong Island
15:30(GMT+8)		Report		Stadium: Ma On Shan Recreation Ground

8 December 2013	Islands (4)	0 – 0 (1 – 3 p)	Lucky Mile (2)	Tai Po, New Territories
15:30(GMT+8)		Report		Stadium: Kwong Fuk Park

8 December 2013	Shatin (2)	5 – 1	Fukien (4)	Kowloon City, Kowloon
15:30(GMT+8)		Report		Stadium: Kowloon Tsai Park #1

8 December 2013	Ornament (4)	2 – 2 (2 – 3 p)	Wing Yee (2)	Causeway Bay, Hong Kong Island
15:30(GMT+8)		Report		Stadium: Causeway Bay Sports Ground

15 December 2013	Kwun Tong (2)	3 – 4	Metro Gallery Sun Source (3)	Happy Valley, Hong Kong Island
13:00 UTC+8		Report		Stadium: Happy Valley Recreation Ground #6

15 December 2013	Mutual (4)	2 – 1	Central & Western (4)	Wong Tai Sin, Kowloon
13:00(GMT+8)		Report		Stadium: Po Kong Village Road Park #2

15 December 2013	On Good (3)	0 – 5	Double Flower (2)	Wong Tai Sin, Kowloon
15:00(GMT+8)		Report		Stadium: Po Kong Village Road Park #2

15 December 2013	Kowloon City (3)	0 – 4	Wofoo Tai Po (2)	Wong Tai Sin, Kowloon
13:00(GMT+8)		Report		Stadium: Po Kong Village Road Park #1

15 December 2013	Eastern District (3)	2 – 2 (9 – 8 p)	New Fair Kuitan (3)	Wong Tai Sin, Kowloon
15:00(GMT+8)		Report		Stadium: Po Kong Village Road Park #1

== Third round ==
The third round draw saw 16 second round winners fighting for 8 quarter-finals place. All third round matches will be played on 22 December 2013.

22 December 2013	Tuen Mun FC (2)	0 – 2	Kwong Wah (3)	Wong Tai Sin, Kowloon
13:00(GMT+8)		Report		Stadium: Po Kong Village Road Park #1

22 December 2013	Mutual (3)	0 – 2	Shatin (2)	Wong Tai Sin, Kowloon
13:00(GMT+8)		Report		Stadium: Po Kong Village Road Park #2

22 December 2013	Eastern District (3)	2 – 3	Lucky Mile (2)	Tuen Mun, New Territories
13:30(GMT+8)		Report		Stadium: Wu Shan Recreation Ground

22 December 2013	Wanchai (2)	1 – 4	Wing Yee (2)	Kowloon City, Kowloon
13:30(GMT+8)		Report		Stadium: Kowloon Tsai Park #1

22 December 2013	Double Flower (2)	1 – 2	Wofoo Tai Po (2)	Wong Tai Sin, Kowloon
15:00(GMT+8)		Report		Stadium: Po Kong Village Road Park #1

22 December 2013	Hong Kong FC (2)	3 – 0	Sham Shui Po (3)	Wong Tai Sin, Kowloon
15:00(GMT+8)		Report		Stadium: Po Kong Village Road Park #2

22 December 2013	Yau Tsim Mong (3)	1 – 3	Kwai Tsing (2)	Tuen Mun, New Territories
15:30(GMT+8)		Report		Stadium: Wu Shan Recreation Ground

22 December 2013	Tai Chung (2)	1 – 2	Metro Gallery Sun Source (3)	Kowloon City, Kowloon
15:30(GMT+8)		Report		Stadium: Kowloon Tsai Park #1

== Quarter-finals ==
The quarter-finals draw saw 8 third-round winners fighting for 4 semi-finals place. All quarter-final matches will be played on 29 December 2013.

29 December 2013	Wing Yee (2)	3 – 3 (5 – 6 p)	Metro Gallery Sun Source (3)	Wong Tai Sin, Kowloon
13:00(GMT+8)		Report		Stadium: Po Kong Village Road Park #2

29 December 2013	Kwong Wah (3)	0 – 9	Wofoo Tai Po (2)	Wong Tai Sin, Kowloon
13:00(GMT+8)		Report		Stadium: Po Kong Village Road Park #1

29 December 2013	Shatin (2)	1 – 2	Hong Kong FC (2)	Wong Tai Sin, Kowloon
15:00(GMT+8)		Report		Stadium: Po Kong Village Road Park #2

29 December 2013	Lucky Mile (2)	0 – 1	Kwai Tsing (2)	Wong Tai Sin, Kowloon
15:00(GMT+8)		Report		Stadium: Po Kong Village Road Park #1

== Semi-finals ==
The semi-finals draw saw 4 quarter-finals winners fighting for 2 final place. It is noted that these 4 teams have been qualified for the 2013–14 Hong Kong FA Cup main round. All semi-final matches will be played on 5 January 2014.

5 January 2014	Metro Gallery Sun Source (3)	1 – 1 (4 – 2 p)	Hong Kong FC (2)	Tuen Mun, New Territories
13:30(GMT+8)		Report		Stadium: Wu Shan Recreation Ground

5 January 2014	Wofoo Tai Po (2)	1 – 2	Kwai Tsing (2)	Tuen Mun, New Territories
15:30(GMT+8)		Report		Stadium: Wu Shan Recreation Ground

== 3rd-place playoff ==
12 January 2014	Hong Kong FC (2)	1–0	Wofoo Tai Po (2)	Tuen Mun, New Territories
13:30 (GMT+8)				Stadium: Wu Shan Recreation Ground

== Final ==
12 January 2014	Metro Gallery Sun Source (3)	3–2	Kwai Tsing (2)	Tuen Mun, New Territories
15:30 (GMT+8)		Report		Stadium: Wu Shan Recreation Ground
