= 2015–16 Hong Kong First Division League =

Hong Kong First Division League
- Season: 2015–16
- Champions: Tai Po
- Promoted: Tai Po; HKFC
- Relegated: Sun Source; Lucky Mile
- Matches played: 182
- Goals scored: 630 (3.46 per match)
- Top goalscorer: Detinho (Easyknit Property) (28 goals)

The 2015–16 Hong Kong First Division League is the 2nd season of Hong Kong First Division League since it became the second-tier football league in Hong Kong in 2014–15.

The league started on 6 September 2015 and ended on 15 May 2016.

== Teams ==
=== Changes from last season ===
==== From First Division League ====
Promoted to Premier League

- Southern

Relegated to Second Division

- Happy Valley
- Tuen Mun

==== To First Division League ====
Relegated from Premier League

- Tai Po

Promoted from Second Division

- Wing Yee

==== Name changes ====
- Wing Yee renamed as Easyknit Property

=== Team review ===
A total of 14 teams will contest the league, including 12 sides from the 2014–15, 1 team relegated from the Premier League and 1 side promoted from the Second Division.

Club	Position in 2014–15	Member since season	Consecutive season in league
Citizen	5th	2014–15	2
Double Flower	11th	2002–03	14
HKFC	2nd	2011–12	5
Kwai Tsing	7th	2013–14	3
Kwun Tong	10th	2013–14	3
Lucky Mile	6th	2013–14	3
Sun Source	1st^{1}	2014–15	2
Shatin	9th	2010–11	6
Sun Hei	8th	2014–15	2
Tai Chung	13th	2011–12	5
Tai Po	9th in Premier League	2015–16	1
Wanchai	12th	2011–12	5
Easyknit Property	1st in Second Division	2015–16	1
Yau Tsim Mong	4th	2014–15	2

Remarks:
^{1}Due to financial difficulties, Metro Gallery Sun Source refused to promote to the Premier League.

== League table ==
Pos	Team	Pld	W	D	L	GF	GA	GD	Pts	Promotion or relegation
1	Tai Po (C, P)	26	19	5	2	67	29	+38	62	Promotion to Premier League
2	HKFC (P)	26	17	6	3	66	21	+45	57	Promotion to Premier League
3	Sun Hei	26	17	5	4	64	25	+39	56	
4	Easyknit Property	26	14	5	7	66	49	+17	47	
5	Yau Tsim Mong	26	13	7	6	55	35	+20	46	
6	Citizen	26	13	6	7	55	31	+24	45	
7	Shatin	26	12	6	8	48	39	+9	42	
8	Double Flower	26	7	6	13	34	46	−12	27 (Note: Double Flower wins head-to-head against Wanchai.)	
9	Wanchai	26	8	3	15	30	56	−26	27	
10	Tai Chung	26	7	2	17	34	63	−29	23	
11	Kwai Tsing	26	4	8	14	36	59	−23	20 (Note: Kwai Tsing wins head-to-head against Kwun Tong.)	
12	Kwun Tong	26	5	5	16	21	52	−31	20	
13	Sun Source (R)	26	5	4	17	26	58	−32	19 (Note: Metro Gallery Sun Source ahead of Lucky Mile on goal difference.)	Relegation to Second Division
14	Lucky Mile (R)	26	5	4	17	28	67	−39	19	Relegation to Second Division

Source: Hong Kong Football Association
Rules for classification: 1) Points; 2) Head-to-head points; 3) Head-to-head goal difference; 4) Head-to-head goals scored; 5) Goal difference; 6) Goals scored; 7) Fair-play points; 8) Drawing lots
(C) Champions; (P) Promoted; (R) Relegated

== Results ==
Home \ Away	CIT	DFL	CLU	KTD	KTF	LML	MGS	SHA	SUN	TAI	TPO	WCH	EKP	YTM
Citizen		3–1	2–3	3–1	4–0	4–0	7–1	2–1	0–1	3–1	0–4	5–3	1–1	1–2
Double Flower	0–0		3–0	1–1	2–0	1–3	2–4	1–1	1–7	4–1	2–2	0–1	1–2	0–0
HKFC	0–0	1–0		1–1	6–0	2–0	2–1	6–1	3–1	7–0	1–2	1–0	4–1	2–2
Kwai Tsing	1–1	1–1	0–6		0–1	0–1	3–3	1–1	0–1	5–0	1–3	0–3	2–5	0–2
Kwun Tong	0–0	1–0	0–1	0–3		1–1	0–1	0–3	2–2	2–1	1–1	0–1	1–2	0–1
Lucky Mile	1–4	1–0	0–3	1–1	2–1		2–0	3–3	1–4	1–3	0–1	0–1	2–4	0–5
Metro Gallery Sun Source	0–3	1–3	1–1	1–1	1–2	2–0		1–1	0–7	0–2	0–1	0–1	2–5	0–2
Shatin	1–0	2–0	1–0	5–3	2–1	3–1	1–0		0–1	4–0	0–1	3–1	2–1	3–3
Sun Hei	1–1	5–1	1–1	3–1	4–1	1–0	3–0	1–0		5–0	1–1	4–1	0–0	0–1
Tai Chung	2–3	1–0	0–2	1–2	2–0	6–0	1–2	4–3	1–3		0–2	3–0	1–3	2–2
Tai Po	2–1	5–2	1–5	6–1	4–1	4–3	3–1	2–0	4–0	3–0		2–1	3–3	3–2
Wanchai	1–3	0–2	0–3	2–1	1–2	1–1	2–1	1–4	2–5	1–1	0–5		2–2	2–0
Easyknit Property	1–3	1–2	1–3	6–4	3–3	3–4	2–1	3–1	3–1	3–1	2–1	5–1		3–0
Yau Tsim Mong	2–1	2–4	2–2	2–1	4–1	8–1	1–2	2–2	0–2	3–0	1–1	3–1	3–1	

Source: Hong Kong Football Association
Legend: Blue = home team win; Yellow = draw; Red = away team win.
