= Yuen Tsun Nam =

Hong Kong footballer (born 1991)

Yuen Tsun Nam 袁浚楠
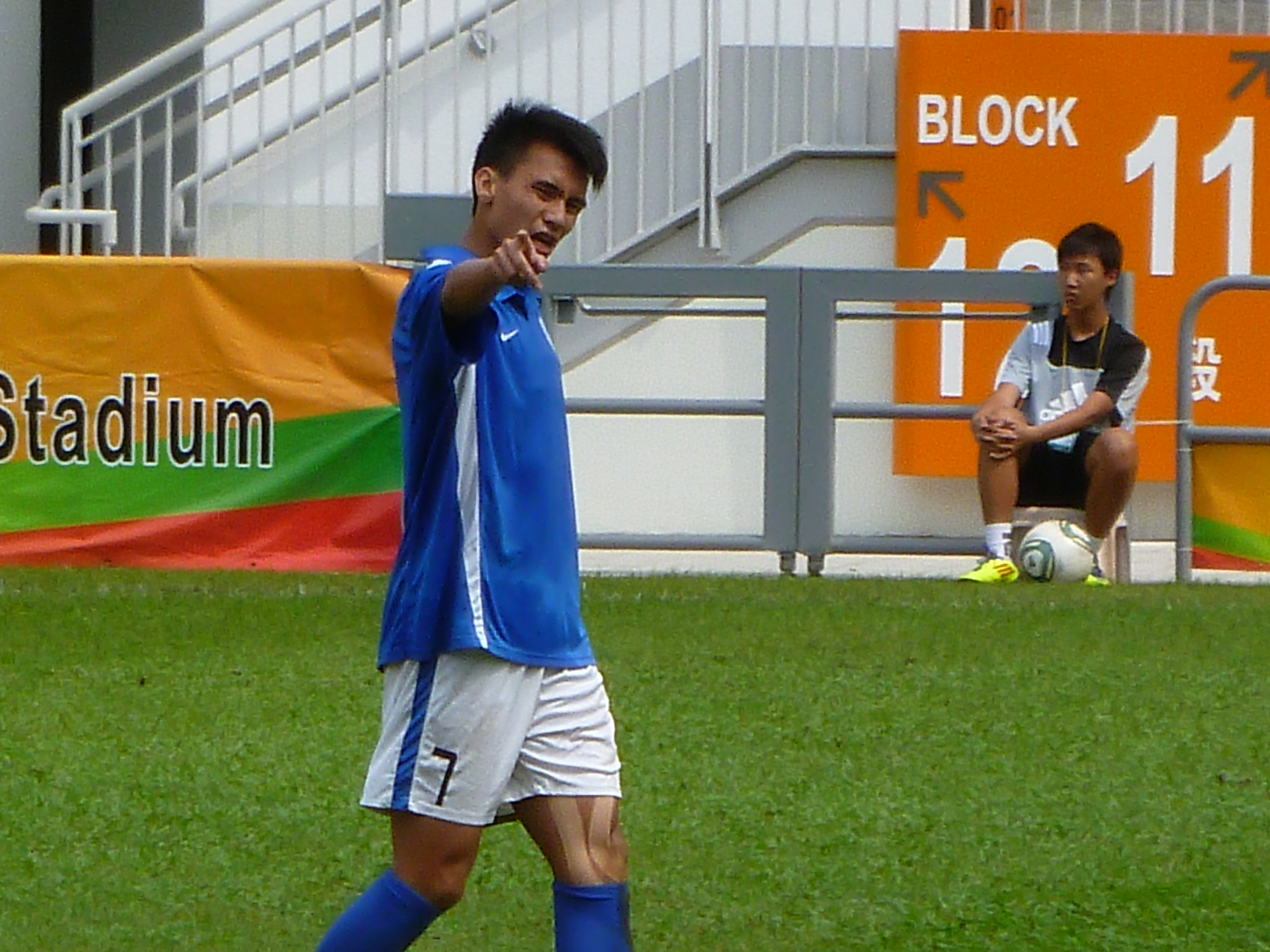
- Yuen Tsun Nam in 2012.

Personal information
- Full name: Yuen Tsun Nam
- Date of birth: 24 May 1991 (age 35)
- Place of birth: British Hong Kong
- Height: 1.83 m (6 ft 0 in)
- Position: Defender

Youth career
- 2007–2009: Hong Kong Rangers
- 2010: Yuen Long

Senior career*
Years	Team	Apps	(Gls)
2010–2012	Pegasus	4	(0)
2012	→ Hong Kong Sapling (loan)	4	(0)
2012–2014	Sun Hei	13	(0)
2013	→ Yuen Long (loan)	0	(0)
2014–2018	Wing Yee	37	(2)
2020–2021	Lucky Mile	1	(1)
2023	Lansbury		
2024–2025	3 Sing	25	(0)
2025–	Kui Tan	16	(0)

International career
2011	Hong Kong U–21	1	(0)
2012	Hong Kong U–22	4	(1)
2011–2013	Hong Kong U–23	4	(1)
- * Club domestic league appearances and goals as of 31 May 2026

Yuen Tsun Nam
- Traditional Chinese: 袁浚楠
Transcriptions
Standard Mandarin
- Hanyu Pinyin: Yuan Jin Nan
Yue: Cantonese
- Jyutping: jyun^{4} zeon^{3} naam^{4}

Yuen Tsun Nam (born 24 May 1991) is a Hong Kong former professional footballer who played as a defender. His twin brother Yuen Tsun Tung is also a former professional footballer.

== Club career ==
=== Early career ===
Yuen Tsun Nam joined the famous Hong Kong football academy Rangers youth team in 2007. After spending two and a half seasons in Rangers, he joined Yuen Long youth team in 2010.

=== Pegasus ===
He signed his first professional contract with Pegasus before the start of the 2010–11 season. However, he was not given too many playing chances. He featured in two league matches and one cup match only. He spent most of the time in the reserves team.

In the 2011–12 season, since there were many players in his position, he only got limited playing chances. Same as last season, he featured two league matches and one cup match only. In January 2012, he was loaned to Hong Kong Sapling, where he played six matches overall. He returned to TSW Pegasus at the end of season.

=== Sun Hei ===
In July 2012, he joined AFC Cup participant Sun Hei, since the club claimed that they wanted a younger team.

== Career statistics ==
=== Club ===
As of 25 December 2016.

Club	Season	Division	League		Senior Shield		FA Cup		League Cup		AFC Cup		Total	
Club	Season	Division	Apps	Goals	Apps	Goals	Apps	Goals	Apps	Goals	Apps	Goals	Apps	Goals
TSW Pegasus	2010–11	First Division	2	0	0	0	1	0	0	0	0	0	3	0
TSW Pegasus	2011–12	First Division	2	0	1	0	0	0	0	0	—	—	3	0
Hong Kong Sapling (loan)	2011–12	First Division	4	0	0	0	1	0	1	0	—	—	6	0
TSW Pegasus Total			4	0	1	0	1	0	0	0	0	0	6	0
Hong Kong Sapling Total			4	0	0	0	1	0	1	0	—	—	6	0
Sunray Cave JC Sun Hei	2012–13	First Division	1	0	0	0	1	0	—	—	4	0	6	0
Sunray Cave JC Sun Hei	2013–14	First Division	12	0	2	1	0	0	—	—	—	—	14	1
Yuen Long (loan)	2013–14	First Division	0	0	0	0	0	0	—	—	—	—	0	0
Sun Hei Total			13	0	2	1	1	0	—	—	4	0	20	1
Yuen Long Total			0	0	0	0	0	0	—	—	—	—	0	0
Wing Yee	2014–15	Second Division	17	2	—	—	1	0	—	—	—	—	18	2
Wing Yee	2015–16	First Division	19	0	—	—	3	0	—	—	—	—	22	0
Wing Yee	2016–17	First Division	0	0	—	—	0	0	—	—	—	—	0	0
Wing Yee Total			36	2	—	—	4	0	—	—	—	—	40	2
Hong Kong Total			57	2	3	1	7	0	1	0	4	0	72	3
