= 2014–15 Hong Kong First Division League =

Hong Kong First Division League
- Season: 2014–15
- Champions: Sun Source
- Promoted: Southern
- Relegated: Happy Valley; Tuen Mun
- Matches: 210
- Goals: 831 (3.96 per match)
- Top goalscorer: Paul Ngue (Sun Source) (40 goals)
- Biggest home win: Southern 9–0 Tuen Mun (15 March 2015)
- Biggest away win: Tai Chung 3–12 HKFC (8 February 2015)
- Highest scoring: Tai Chung 3–12 HKFC (8 February 2015)

The 2014–15 Hong Kong First Division League is 1st season of Hong Kong First Division League since it became the second-tier football league in Hong Kong in 2014–15.

The league started on 7 September 2014 and ended on 12 June 2015.

== Teams ==
=== Changes from last season ===
==== From First Division ====
Promoted to Premier League

- Tai Po
- Wong Tai Sin

Relegated to Second Division

- Wing Yee
- Tuen Mun FC

==== To First Division ====
Relegated from First Division

- Southern
- Sun Hei
- Citizen
- Tuen Mun
- Happy Valley

Promoted from Third Division

- Sun Source
- Yau Tsim Mong

== League table ==
Pos	Team	Pld	W	D	L	GF	GA	GD	Pts	Promotion or relegation
1	Sun Source (Note: Sun Source declined promotion to Premier League due to financial difficulties.) (C)	28	23	3	2	81	24	+57	72	
2	HKFC	28	18	6	4	93	31	+62	60 (Note: HKFC wins head-to-head against Southern.)	
3	Southern (P)	28	19	3	6	87	40	+47	60	Promotion to Premier League
4	Yau Tsim Mong	28	18	5	5	77	36	+41	59	
5	Citizen	28	15	7	6	68	38	+30	52	
6	Lucky Mile	28	14	5	9	56	47	+9	47	
7	Kwai Tsing	28	11	7	10	56	49	+7	40	
8	Sun Hei	28	11	4	13	58	58	0	37	
9	Shatin	28	9	7	12	55	64	−9	34	
10	Kwun Tong	28	8	7	13	35	54	−19	31	
11	Double Flower	28	8	4	16	41	65	−24	28	
12	Wanchai	28	7	2	19	36	63	−27	23 (Note: Wanchai wins head-to-head against Tai Chung.)	
13	Tai Chung	28	7	2	19	33	89	−56	23	
14	Happy Valley (R)	28	4	5	19	30	79	−49	17	Relegation to Second Division
15	Tuen Mun (R)	28	3	3	22	25	94	−69	12	Relegation to Second Division

Source: Hong Kong Football Association
Rules for classification: 1) Points; 2) Head-to-head points; 3) Head-to-head goal difference; 4) Head-to-head goals scored; 5) Goal difference; 6) Goals scored; 7) Fair-play points; 8) Drawing lots (Play-off if the winner has to be decided)
(C) Champions; (P) Promoted; (R) Relegated

== Results ==
Home \ Away	CIT	DFL	HVA	HKF	KTD	KTF	LML	SHA	SOU	SUN	SSC	TAI	TMN	WCH	YTM
Citizen		4–0	6–1	1–0	3–2	2–1	1–1	3–1	1–1	1–0	1–1	1–0	7–1	2–3	1–2
Double Flower	1–2		4–2	0–3	3–2	2–0	2–5	1–2	1–2	4–0	2–2	0–1	1–0	3–1	1–3
Happy Valley	2–5	4–1		0–7	2–2	2–2	0–5	0–3	0–2	0–3	1–5	2–3	2–2	1–0	0–3
HKFC	1–0	6–1	2–0		1–0	2–2	2–1	3–1	3–1	3–1	2–3	7–1	0–0	4–0	1–1
Kwai Tsing	3–2	1–1	4–1	3–1		2–0	0–0	3–3	1–3	1–2	1–5	6–1	3–1	0–0	3–1
Kwun Tong	2–3	0–3	0–0	0–7	0–2		2–2	2–0	0–2	3–3	1–2	0–1	5–2	1–0	1–7
Lucky Mile	3–1	4–0	2–0	0–5	1–2	0–1		2–4	2–2	3–2	2–0	0–0	1–0	2–1	1–2
Shatin	3–3	1–1	2–1	2–2	2–2	0–2	1–2		1–4	0–3	0–2	2–0	3–0	5–0	3–5
Southern	2–1	4–1	3–0	0–1	3–3	1–2	4–3	6–0		3–2	2–4	4–1	9–0	2–1	1–4
Sun Hei	1–6	2–4	1–1	4–4	1–0	3–0	4–1	2–2	1–3		0–2	4–1	5–1	2–0	3–4
Sun Source	1–1	6–0	5–0	2–0	3–1	3–1	4–0	5–0	0–7	3–0		4–0	2–0	2–0	2–1
Tai Chung	1–4	2–1	1–5	3–12	4–3	0–1	2–3	2–2	0–4	3–5	0–5		1–3	1–0	0–2
Tuen Mun	1–1	2–1	1–2	0–7	1–2	1–4	2–4	1–7	2–6	2–1	0–4	2–3		0–1	0–2
Wanchai	1–3	2–0	2–1	2–5	3–4	2–2	2–3	5–2	2–4	1–3	0–1	2–0	4–0		0–7
Yau Tsim Mong	2–2	2–2	3–0	2–2	1–0	0–0	1–3	2–3	3–2	2–0	1–3	5–1	6–0	3–1	

Source: Hong Kong Football Association
Legend: Blue = home team win; Yellow = draw; Red = away team win.
