= 2019–20 Hong Kong First Division League =

Hong Kong First Division
- Season: 2019–20
- Champions: N/A (season abandoned)
- Promoted: Resources Capital
- Matches: 87
- Goals: 354 (4.07 per match)
- Top goalscorer: Stefan Pereira (Citizen) (19 goals)
- Biggest home win: Resources Capital 8–0 Sham Shui Po (8 September 2019)
- Biggest away win: Icanfield 1–9 HKFC (1 December 2019)
- Highest scoring: King Fung 9–3 Wong Tai Sin (11 November 2019)
- Longest winning run: HKFC (6 matches)
- Longest unbeaten run: Resources Capital (7 matches)
- Longest winless run: Wong Tai Sin; Sham Shui Po (9 matches)
- Longest losing run: Sham Shui Po (9 matches)

The 2019–20 Hong Kong First Division League was the 6th season of Hong Kong First Division since it became the second-tier football league in Hong Kong in 2014–15. The season began on 7 September 2019 and ended on 16 April 2020 when the Hong Kong Football Association announced the cancellation of all lower division seasons due to the 2020 coronavirus pandemic in Hong Kong.

League leaders Resources Capital applied for promotion to the Hong Kong Premier League at season's end and were accepted on 24 June 2020.

== Teams ==
=== Changes from last season ===
==== From First Division ====
===== Promoted to the Premier League =====
- Happy Valley
- Rangers

===== Relegated to the Second Division =====
- Double Flower
- Mutual

==== To First Division ====
===== Relegated from the Premier League =====
- Dreams FC
- Hoi King

===== Promoted from the Second Division =====
- North District
- Sham Shui Po

==== Name changes ====
- Dreams FC renamed as King Fung
- Metro Gallery renamed as Icanfield

== League table ==
Pos	Team	Pld	W	D	L	GF	GA	GD	Pts	Promotion or relegation
1	Resources Capital (P)	13	9	3	1	29	11	+18	30	Promotion to Premier League
2	King Fung	13	8	1	4	44	27	+17	25	
3	HKFC	12	8	1	3	38	18	+20	25	
4	South China	13	7	3	3	30	19	+11	24	
5	Eastern District	11	7	1	3	29	14	+15	22	
6	Central & Western	13	6	3	4	22	24	−2	21	
7	Wing Yee	12	5	3	4	27	27	0	18	
8	Citizen	13	5	1	7	34	33	+1	16	
9	Hoi King	12	4	3	5	23	20	+3	15	
10	Sha Tin	13	4	2	7	24	27	−3	14	
11	North District	12	3	3	6	14	23	−9	12	
12	Icanfield	12	3	2	7	12	38	−26	11	
13	Wong Tai Sin	13	2	4	7	21	34	−13	10	
14	Sham Shui Po	12	1	0	11	7	39	−32	3	

Updated to match(es) played on 19 January 2020. Source: Hong Kong Football Association
Rules for classification: 1) Points; 2) Head-to-head points; 3) Head-to-head goal difference; 4) Head-to-head goals scored; 5) Goal difference; 6) Goals scored; 7) Fair-play points; 8) Drawing lots
(P) Promoted

=== Top scorers ===
As of 16 April 2020

Rank	Player	Club	Goals
1	(Brazil) Stefan Pereira	Citizen	19
2	(Brazil) Jose Leonardo	Eastern District	12
2	(Democratic Republic of the Congo) Tiekoro Sissoko	King Fung	12
4	(Spain) Jose Cabot Almela	Wing Yee Property	11
5	(Hong Kong) Ye Jia	South China	10
6	(Hong Kong) Caleb Ekwegwo	King Fung	9
6	(Hong Kong) To Hon To	Eastern District	9
8	(Hong Kong) Chan Kin Fai	Central & Western	8
8	(Hong Kong) Sham Kwok Keung	Citizen	8
