= 2017–18 Hong Kong First Division League =

Hong Kong First Division
- Season: 2017–18
- Champions: HKFC
- Promoted: Hoi King
- Relegated: Sun Hei; Tung Sing; Kwun Tong; Wan Chai
- Matches played: 240
- Goals scored: 895 (3.73 per match)
- Top goalscorer: Michael Hampshire (HKFC); Jordan David (Sha Tin) (26 goals)
- Biggest home win: HKFC 8–0 Wanchai (10 December 2017)
- Biggest away win: Eastern District 0–10 HKFC (11 March 2018); Wanchai 0–10 HKFC (15 April 2018)
- Highest scoring: Double Flower 5–6 Metro Gallery (25 February 2018)
- Longest winning run: HKFC (10 matches)
- Longest unbeaten run: HKFC (30 matches)
- Longest winless run: Wanchai (18 matches)
- Longest losing run: Wanchai (11 matches)

The 2017–18 Hong Kong First Division League was the 4th season of Hong Kong First Division since it became the second-tier football league in Hong Kong in 2014–15. The season began on 9 September 2017 and ended on 20 May 2018.

== Teams ==
=== Changes from last season ===
==== From First Division ====
Relegated to the Second Division

- Kwai Tsing
- Yau Tsim Mong

==== To First Division ====
Relegated from the Premier League

- South China
- HKFC

Promoted from the Second Division

- Sparta Rotterdam Mutual
- Hoi King

==== Name Changes ====
- Easyknit Property renamed as Wing Yee

== League table ==
Pos	Team	Pld	W	D	L	GF	GA	GD	Pts	Promotion or relegation
1	HKFC (Note: HKFC won the right to be promoted but declined as they did not want to field a professional team) (C)	30	25	5	0	117	21	+96	80	
2	Sha Tin	30	19	6	5	66	32	+34	63	
3	Eastern District	30	17	6	7	61	51	+10	57	
4	Wing Yee	30	16	7	7	72	40	+32	55	
5	Sparta Rotterdam (Mutual)	30	15	7	8	59	39	+20	52	
6	Double Flower	30	15	3	12	67	53	+14	48	
7	Wong Tai Sin	30	14	5	11	67	55	+12	47	
8	Hoi King (Note: Hoi King applied for and were granted promotion) (P)	30	12	6	12	42	44	−2	42	Promotion to Premier League
9	Resources Capital	30	12	5	13	56	59	−3	41	
10	Citizen	30	11	7	12	63	65	−2	40	
11	South China	30	10	8	12	51	48	+3	38	
12	Metro Gallery	30	10	5	15	41	72	−31	35	
13	Sun Hei (R)	30	8	7	15	49	65	−16	31	Relegation to Second Division
14	Tung Sing (R)	30	6	5	19	40	84	−44	23	Relegation to Second Division
15	Kwun Tong (R)	30	3	7	20	25	60	−35	16	Relegation to Second Division
16	Wan Chai (R)	30	1	3	26	19	107	−88	6	Relegation to Second Division

Updated to match(es) played on 20 May 2018. Source: Hong Kong Football Association
Rules for classification: 1) Points; 2) Head-to-head points; 3) Head-to-head goal difference; 4) Head-to-head goals scored; 5) Goal difference; 6) Goals scored; 7) Fair-play points; 8) Drawing lots
(C) Champions; (P) Promoted; (R) Relegated
