= Hong Kong FA Cup Junior Division =

Association football tournament in Hong Kong

- Founded: 2013
- Region: Hong Kong
- Teams: 44
- Current champions: Tung Sing (1st title)
- Most championships: Sun Hei; Central & Western (2 titles)
- 2025–26 Hong Kong FA Cup Junior Division

Hong Kong FA Cup Junior Division (Chinese: 香港足總盃初級組) is a football competition in Hong Kong established in 2013. All lower division teams in the First Division, Second Division and the Third Division are included in the competition.

Sun Hei and Central & Western are the most successful clubs, both winning 2 titles.

== History ==
FA Cup preliminary round was founded by the Hong Kong Football Association in 2013, replacing the abolished Hong Kong Junior Challenge Shield. Between 2013 and 2016, the competition was designed to allow lower division clubs to qualify for the tournament proper. In 2016, after the HKFA decided not to allow lower division clubs to compete in the tournament proper anymore, it was then renamed to FA Cup Junior Division.

== Champions ==
Season	Final			Third Place			Venues	Ref.
Season	Champions	Score	Runners-up	Third Place	Score	Fourth Place	Venues	Ref.
2013–14	Sun Source (3)	3–2	Kwai Tsing (2)	HKFC (2)	1–0	Tai Po (2)	Wu Shan Recreation Playground	
2014–15	Citizen (2)	1–0	Yau Tsim Mong (2)	Sha Tin (2)	4–2	Southern (2)	Tsing Yi Northeast Park	
2015–16	Sun Hei (2)	2–1	Tai Po (2)	Wan Chai (2)	2–2 (4–3 p)	Wing Yee (2)	Tin Yip Road Park	
2016–17	Sun Hei (2)	2–0	Double Flower (2)	Wong Tai Sin (2)	7–2	Wing Yee (2)	Kowloon Tsai Park	
2017–18	Sha Tin (2)	1–1 (4–3 p)	Double Flower (2)	Wing Yee (2)	3–1	Citizen (2)	Kowloon Tsai Park	
2018–19	Happy Valley (2)	2–0	Resources Capital (2)	Central & Western (2)	2–1	Wing Yee (2)	Po Kong Village Road Park No. 1	
2019–20	Cancelled due to COVID-19 pandemic in Hong Kong							
2020–21	Cancelled due to COVID-19 pandemic in Hong Kong							
2021–22	Cancelled due to COVID-19 pandemic in Hong Kong							
2022–23	Central & Western (2)	2–1	Hoi King (2)	Citizen (2)	2–1	Eastern District (2)	Siu Sai Wan Sports Ground	
2023–24	Central & Western (2)	2–2 (4–3 p)	South China (2)	Wing Yee (2)	2–1	Yuen Long (2)	Po Kong Village Road Park No. 1	
2024–25	South China (2)	3–0	Sham Shui Po (2)	Central & Western (2)	4–0	Yuen Long (2)	Hammer Hill Road Sports Ground / Tsing Yi Northeast Park	
2025–26	Tung Sing (2)	1–1 (4–2 p)	South China (2)	Hoi King (2)	2–1	Central & Western (2)	Hammer Hill Road Sports Ground / Kowloon Bay Sports Ground	

== Results by team ==
Team	Wins	Last final won	Runners-up	Last final lost
Sun Hei	2	2016–17	–	–
Central & Western	2	2023–24	–	–
South China	1	2024–25	2	2025–26
Citizen	1	2014–15	1	2022–23
Sun Source	1	2013–14	–	–
Shatin	1	2017–18	–	–
Happy Valley	1	2018–19	–	–
Tung Sing	1	2025–26	–	–
Double Flower	–	–	2	2017–18
Kwai Tsing	–	–	1	2013–14
Yau Tsim Mong	–	–	1	2014–15
Tai Po	–	–	1	2015–16
Resources Capital	–	–	1	2018–19
Sham Shui Po	–	–	1	2024–25

== See also ==
- Hong Kong FA Cup
- Hong Kong Junior Challenge Shield
