= 2016–17 Hong Kong First Division League =

Hong Kong First Division League
- Season: 2016–17
- Champions: Sun Hei
- Promoted: None
- Relegated: Kwai Tsing; Yau Tsim Mong
- Matches played: 182
- Goals scored: 764 (4.2 per match)
- Top goalscorer: Caleb Ekwegwo (Wong Tai Sin) (41 goals)
- Biggest home win: Citizen 8–1 Yau Tsim Mong (5 November 2016) Tung Sing 9–2 Eastern District (14 May 2017)
- Biggest away win: Yau Tsim Mong 0–9 Eastern District (10 September 2016); Yau Tsim Mong 0–9 Wong Tai Sin (4 December 2016)
- Highest scoring: Kwai Tsing 5–7 Easyknit Property (11 September 2016)
- Longest winning run: Sun Hei (10 matches)
- Longest unbeaten run: Sun Hei (26 matches)
- Longest winless run: Yau Tsim Mong (22 matches)
- Longest losing run: Yau Tsim Mong (16 matches)

The 2016–17 Hong Kong First Division League was the 3rd season of Hong Kong First Division League since it became the second-tier football league in Hong Kong in 2014–15.

== Teams ==
=== Changes from last season ===
==== From First Division League ====
Promoted to Premier League

- Tai Po
- HKFC

Relegated to Second Division

- Lucky Mile
- Sun Source

==== To First Division League ====
Relegated from Premier League

- Wong Tai Sin
- Metro Gallery

Promoted from Second Division

- Eastern District
- Tung Sing

== League table ==
Pos	Team	Pld	W	D	L	GF	GA	GD	Pts	Promotion or relegation
1	Sun Hei (Note: Sun Hei and Wong Tai Sin both won the right to be promoted to the Hong Kong Premier League but declined.) (C)	26	23	3	0	90	22	+68	72	
2	Wong Tai Sin	26	23	2	1	102	30	+72	71	
3	Easyknit Property	26	17	4	5	80	49	+31	55	
4	Sha Tin	26	13	5	8	51	32	+19	44	
5	Double Flower	26	12	4	10	48	45	+3	40	
6	Citizen	26	9	6	11	57	62	−5	33	
7	Kwun Tong	26	7	9	10	30	37	−7	30	
8	Eastern District	26	9	3	14	44	53	−9	30	
9	Resources Capital	26	8	6	12	40	62	−22	30	
10	Tung Sing	26	9	2	15	66	77	−11	29	
11	Metro Gallery	26	6	7	13	44	55	−11	25	
12	Wan Chai	26	8	1	17	45	63	−18	25	
13	Kwai Tsing (R)	26	5	7	14	43	68	−25	22	Relegation to Second Division
14	Yau Tsim Mong (R)	26	3	1	22	24	109	−85	10	Relegation to Second Division

Updated to match(es) played on 14 May 2017. Source: Hong Kong Football Association
Rules for classification: 1) Points; 2) Head-to-head points; 3) Head-to-head goal difference; 4) Head-to-head goals scored; 5) Goal difference; 6) Goals scored; 7) Fair-play points; 8) Drawing lots
(C) Champions; (R) Relegated
