= 2007–08 Hong Kong Second Division League =

The 2007–08 Hong Kong Second Division League season was started on 8 September 2007.

== League table ==
Pos	Team	Pld	W	D	L	GF	GA	GD	Pts	Promotion or relegation
1	Mutual (C, P)	18	14	3	1	60	20	+40	45	Promotion to First Division
2	HKFC	18	13	2	3	87	24	+63	41	Declined promotion to First Division
3	Fukien	18	8	3	7	36	39	−3	27	
4	Tung Po	18	6	7	5	23	27	−4	25	
5	Double Flower	18	7	3	8	24	34	−10	24	
6	Kwai Tsing	18	6	5	7	23	27	−4	23	
7	EU Tai Chung	18	5	4	9	28	38	−10	19	
8	Kwok Keung	18	5	4	9	18	42	−24	19	
9	Lucky Mile (R)	18	4	6	8	27	37	−10	18	Relegation to Third Division
10	New Fair Kui Tan (R)	18	1	5	12	15	53	−38	8	Relegation to Third Division

Source: The Hong Kong Football Association official website League table of 2nd Div 2007–08
(C) Champions; (P) Promoted; (R) Relegated

== Results ==
Home \ Away	DOU	EUT	FUK	HKF	KWA	KWO	LUC	MUT	NEW	TUN
Double Flower	—	0–0	4–0	0–3	1–2	2–0	1–1	0–3	2–1	1–1
EU Tai Chung	2–4	—	1–2	1–10	1–3	3–0	1–3	0–2	3–0	1–1
Fukien	4–0	1–4	—	3–2	3–0	1–4	2–1	4–5	1–0	2–3
HKFC	6–1	6–3	1–1	—	3–1	11–0	8–1	3–2	6–0	5–2
Kwai Tsing	1–2	2–1	0–0	0–3	—	0–1	3–1	1–1	2–2	1–0
Kwok Keung	0–1	0–0	1–1	0–7	0–4	—	2–1	0–3	0–0	4–0
Lucky Mile	2–0	1–4	1–2	3–3	4–1	1–2	—	2–2	1–0	0–0
Mutual	7–2	1–0	8–5	3–2	2–0	2–0	2–0	—	8–0	3–0
New Fair Kui Tan	0–3	1–2	1–3	0–7	1–1	3–3	3–3	0–5	—	2–1
Tung Po	1–0	1–1	3–1	3–1	1–1	2–1	1–1	1–1	2–1	—

Legend: Blue = home team win; Yellow = draw; Red = away team win.

== See also ==
- The Hong Kong Football Association
- Hong Kong First Division League
- Hong Kong Third Division League
