= 2025–26 Hong Kong First Division League =

Hong Kong First Division
- Season: 2025–26
- Champions: Supreme FC
- Promoted: Sha Tin
- Relegated: Kwun Tong
- Matches: 182
- Goals: 720 (3.96 per match)
- Top goalscorer: David Bala (WSE) (45 goals)
- Biggest home win: Supreme FC 9–0 Lucky Mile (7 September 2025)
- Biggest away win: Kwun Tong 1–8 WSE (21 September 2025); Lucky Mile 1–8 Resources Capital (28 September 2025); Citizen 0–7 Central & Western (23 November 2025)
- Highest scoring: Yuen Long 3–8 WSE (12 April 2026)
- Longest winning run: Supreme FC (10 matches)
- Longest unbeaten run: Supreme FC (23 matches)
- Longest winless run: Kwun Tong (22 matches)
- Longest losing run: Kwun Tong (16 matches)

The 2025–26 Hong Kong First Division League is the 12th season of Hong Kong First Division since it became the second-tier football league in Hong Kong in 2014–15. The season began on 7 September 2025 and ended on 17 May 2026.

== Teams ==
=== Changes from last season ===
==== From First Division ====
===== Promoted to the Hong Kong Premier League =====
- Eastern District

==== To First Division ====
===== Promoted from the Second Division =====
- Tung Sing
- Supreme FC
- Kwun Tong
- Lucky Mile

== League table ==
Pos	Team	Pld	W	D	L	GF	GA	GD	Pts	Promotion or relegation
1	Supreme FC (C)	26	23	2	1	106	28	+78	71	
2	WSE	26	21	3	2	102	21	+81	66	
3	South China	26	17	4	5	60	22	+38	55	
4	Sham Shui Po	26	14	4	8	45	38	+7	46	
5	Tung Sing	26	13	4	9	47	33	+14	43	
6	Hoi King	26	12	5	9	52	50	+2	41	
7	Central & Western	26	12	3	11	60	44	+16	39	
8	Yuen Long	26	11	5	10	47	48	−1	38	
9	Sha Tin (P)	26	10	5	11	45	45	0	35	Promotion to the Premier League
10	Resources Capital	26	9	7	10	46	42	+4	34	
11	Bright Cerulean	26	5	4	17	31	76	−45	19	
12	Citizen	26	4	2	20	39	81	−42	14	
13	Lucky Mile	26	3	2	21	24	106	−82	11	
14	Kwun Tong (R)	26	1	2	23	21	91	−70	5	Relegation to the Second Division

Updated to match(es) played on 17 May 2026. Source: Hong Kong Football Association
Rules for classification: 1) Points; 2) Head-to-head points; 3) Head-to-head goal difference; 4) Head-to-head goals scored; 5) Goal difference; 6) Goals scored; 7) Fair-play points; 8) Drawing lots
(C) Champions; (P) Promoted; (R) Relegated
