= 2015–16 Hong Kong Second Division League =

Hong Kong Second Division League
- Season: 2015–16
- Champions: Tung Sing
- Promoted: Tung Sing; Eastern District
- Relegated: Tsuen Wan; Happy Valley
- Matches: 132
- Goals: 414 (3.14 per match)

The 2015–16 Hong Kong Second Division League is the 2nd season of Hong Kong Second Division League since it became the third-tier football league in Hong Kong in 2014–15.

The league started on 13 September 2015 and ended on 8 May 2016.

== Teams ==
=== Changes from last season ===
==== From Second Division ====
Promoted to First Division

- Wing Yee

Relegated to Third Division

- New Fair Kui Tan

Withdrew from league

- Fire Services

==== To Second Division ====
Relegated from First Division

- Happy Valley
- Tuen Mun

Promoted from Third Division

- Tung Sing

== League table ==
Pos	Team	Pld	W	D	L	GF	GA	GD	Pts	Promotion or relegation
1	Tung Sing (C, P)	22	16	3	3	56	27	+29	51	Promotion to First Division
2	Eastern District (P)	22	15	4	3	65	23	+42	49	Promotion to First Division
3	Sparta Rotterdam Mutual	22	13	6	3	39	18	+21	45	
4	Sham Shui Po	22	13	4	5	32	22	+10	43	
5	Kwong Wah	22	9	3	10	29	34	−5	30	
6	Sai Kung	22	7	7	8	31	29	+2	28	
7	Kwok Keung	22	6	8	8	27	32	−5	26	
8	Kowloon City	22	7	5	10	27	30	−3	26	
9	Tuen Mun	22	7	2	13	33	52	−19	23	
10	Tuen Mun FC	22	4	6	12	32	49	−17	18	
11	Tsuen Wan (R)	22	4	4	14	30	49	−19	16	Relegation to Third Division
12	Happy Valley (R)	22	2	6	14	15	51	−36	12	Relegation to Third Division

Source: Hong Kong Football Association
Rules for classification: 1) Points; 2) Head-to-head points; 3) Head-to-head goal difference; 4) Head-to-head goals scored; 5) Goal difference; 6) Goals scored; 7) Fair-play points; 8) Drawing lots
(C) Champions; (P) Promoted; (R) Relegated

== Results ==
Home \ Away	EDS	HVA	KLC	KKA	KWW	SKD	SSP	SRM	TWF	TMN	TMF	TSF
Eastern District		1–0	2–2	1–1	4–0	1–1	2–2	4–0	4–3	2–1	3–0	1–3
Happy Valley	0–5		1–4	0–0	0–4	1–3	0–3	0–2	2–2	0–4	1–1	2–4
Kowloon City	1–4	1–0		1–2	0–0	1–3	0–1	2–1	0–3	4–1	0–0	3–2
Kwok Keung	1–4	2–2	0–0		1–0	3–3	1–0	0–0	1–2	1–3	1–5	0–1
Kwong Wah	1–4	0–1	1–0	2–1		1–3	2–0	0–1	2–2	4–1	2–1	1–4
Sai Kung	0–1	0–0	3–0	1–1	1–1		1–2	0–0	2–1	1–2	3–2	2–3
Sham Shui Po	1–2	2–0	1–0	1–0	3–1	0–0		1–3	1–0	3–2	3–1	3–5
Sparta Rotterdam Mutual	1–0	3–0	1–0	1–1	2–0	2–0	1–2		1–0	2–1	3–0	0–0
Tsuen Wan	0–4	2–2	2–1	1–4	0–2	0–2	0–1	2–5		1–3	1–1	2–3
Tuen Mun	0–9	4–1	1–4	1–3	1–2	2–1	0–1	2–2	2–1		2–3	0–5
Tuen Mun FC	1–5	0–2	1–1	1–2	4–0	3–1	1–1	2–7	2–4	0–0		2–3
Tung Sing	4–2	4–0	0–2	2–1	0–3	2–0	0–0	1–1	4–1	2–0	4–1	

Source: Hong Kong Football Association
Legend: Blue = home team win; Yellow = draw; Red = away team win.
