= 2016–17 Hong Kong Second Division League =

Hong Kong Second Division League
- Season: 2016–17
- Champions: Sparta Rotterdam Mutual
- Promoted: Sparta Rotterdam Mutual; Hoi King
- Relegated: Kwok Keung Linkers ONC; Tuen Mun

The 2016–17 Hong Kong Second Division League will be the 3rd season of Hong Kong Second Division League since it became the third-tier football league in Hong Kong in 2014–15.

== Teams ==
=== Changes from last season ===
==== From Second Division ====
Promoted to First Division

- Eastern District
- Tung Sing

Relegated to Third Division

- Tsuen Wan
- Happy Valley

==== To Second Division ====
Relegated from First Division

- Lucky Mile
- Metro Gallery Sun Source

Promoted from Third Division

- Central & Western
- Hoi King

== League table ==
Pos	Team	Pld	W	D	L	GF	GA	GD	Pts	Promotion or relegation
1	Sparta Rotterdam Mutual (C, P)	22	16	2	4	43	18	+25	50	Promotion to First Division
2	Hoi King (P)	22	13	7	2	52	21	+31	46 (Note: Hoi King wins head-to-head against Central & Western)	Promotion to First Division
3	Central & Western	22	14	4	4	43	14	+29	46	
4	Lucky Mile	22	14	2	6	39	27	+12	44	
5	Kowloon City	22	11	5	6	28	21	+7	38	
6	Tuen Mun	22	8	6	8	30	29	+1	30	
7	Sham Shui Po	22	8	5	9	23	28	−5	29	
8	HKU CXSC Sun Source	22	8	4	10	33	31	+2	28	
9	Sai Kung	22	4	5	13	14	37	−23	17	
10	Kwong Wah	22	3	6	13	15	41	−26	15 (Note: Kwong Wah wins head-to-head against Kwok Keung Linkers ONC)	
11	Kwok Keung Linkers ONC (R)	22	4	3	15	18	35	−17	15	Relegation to Third Division
12	Tuen Mun FC (R)	22	2	5	15	21	57	−36	11	Relegation to Third Division

Updated to match(es) played on 7 May 2017. Source: Hong Kong Football Association
Rules for classification: 1) Points; 2) Head-to-head points; 3) Head-to-head goal difference; 4) Head-to-head goals scored; 5) Goal difference; 6) Goals scored; 7) Fair-play points; 8) Drawing lots
(C) Champions; (P) Promoted; (R) Relegated
