= 2015–16 Hong Kong Third Division League =

Hong Kong Third Division League
- Season: 2015–16
- Champions: Hoi King
- Promoted: Hoi King; Central & Western
- Relegated: Kowloon Cricket Club; HKFYG
- Matches: 240
- Goals: 829 (3.45 per match)

The 2015–16 Hong Kong Third Division League is the 2nd season of Hong Kong Third Division League since it became the fourth-tier football league in Hong Kong in 2014–15.

The league started on 6 September 2015 and ended on 22 May 2016.

== Teams ==
=== Changes from last season ===
==== From Third Division ====
Promoted to Second Division

- Tung Sing

Eliminated from league

- Lung Moon

==== To Third Division ====
Relegated from Second Division

- New Fair Kui Tan

New Clubs

- Sun International
- HKFYG
- Hoi King

== League table ==
Pos	Team	Pld	W	D	L	GF	GA	GD	Pts	Promotion or relegation
1	Hoi King (C, P)	30	26	1	3	77	19	+58	79 (Note: Hoi King wins head-to-head against Central & Western.)	Promotion to Second Division
2	Central & Western (P)	30	25	4	1	101	11	+90	79	Promotion to Second Division
3	St. Joseph's	30	17	9	4	63	24	+39	60	
4	REX Global North District	30	18	2	10	65	46	+19	56	
5	KCDRSC	30	17	3	10	59	46	+13	54	
6	Wing Go Fu Moon	30	16	5	9	58	44	+14	53	
7	GFC Friends	30	15	3	12	60	33	+27	48	
8	Sun International	30	13	7	10	44	41	+3	46	
9	Fukien	30	11	8	11	54	49	+5	41	
10	Ornament	30	12	4	14	47	56	−9	40	
11	Telecom	30	8	8	14	45	62	−17	32	
12	Islands	30	9	4	17	38	61	−23	31	
13	New Fair Kui Tan	30	6	8	16	39	59	−20	26	
14	King Mountain	30	6	2	22	29	94	−65	20	
15	Kowloon Cricket Club (E)	30	4	2	24	34	76	−42	14	Elimination from League
16	HKFYG (E)	30	1	2	27	16	108	−92	5	Elimination from League

Source: Hong Kong Football Association
Rules for classification: 1) Points; 2) Head-to-head points; 3) Head-to-head goal difference; 4) Head-to-head goals scored; 5) Goal difference; 6) Goals scored; 7) Fair-play points; 8) Drawing lots
(C) Champions; (E) Eliminated; (P) Promoted

== Results ==
Home \ Away	CWD	FUK	GFC	HKI	ISL	KMF	KCD	KCC	NFK	ORN	TEL	NDF	SJF	SUN	FYG	FUM
Central & Western		3–0	2–0	1–2	6–0	5–0	5–1	4–0	4–0	5–0	6–0	7–1	3–1	2–1	4–0	2–0
Fukien	1–5		1–1	2–3	4–0	7–1	0–4	2–1	2–0	1–0	0–0	1–2	1–4	1–2	6–0	2–2
GFC Friends	2–2	3–2		0–1	1–3	7–0	1–0	2–1	3–2	3–1	3–2	2–0	3–0	0–1	4–0	0–2
Hoi King	0–0	1–0	2–1		1–0	9–0	1–0	3–1	4–0	6–0	4–2	1–2	1–0	3–0	2–0	4–1
Islands	0–5	2–2	0–4	0–2		7–1	2–3	2–0	1–0	1–0	0–0	0–1	1–1	0–2	5–0	1–2
King Mountain	0–5	2–2	0–0	1–4	3–1		1–3	0–1	0–1	2–1	5–4	0–3	0–2	0–2	3–0	1–2
KCDRSC	0–3	0–1	0–2	1–2	2–0	3–1		3–0	1–1	1–1	5–2	3–1	3–3	3–1	4–0	2–1
Kowloon Cricket Club	0–2	4–0	1–5	1–3	3–4	0–2	1–2		1–4	0–4	2–3	0–4	0–3	0–3	5–0	4–5
New Fair Kui Tan	1–3	2–2	0–4	0–3	2–2	1–2	1–2	3–1		3–3	1–1	4–1	1–1	1–1	2–0	2–0
Ornament	1–3	4–2	2–1	0–3	3–1	4–1	3–1	0–0	2–1		0–2	2–0	1–2	0–4	3–1	1–2
Telecom	0–4	1–2	1–0	0–4	0–2	3–0	1–2	3–0	3–1	1–3		2–4	1–1	1–1	6–2	0–0
REX Global North District	0–0	1–2	1–0	1–3	5–0	4–0	5–1	2–0	2–1	4–0	2–1		1–2	5–2	3–1	1–4
St. Joseph's	0–0	0–0	3–1	1–0	5–0	4–0	3–1	2–0	5–2	1–1	6–0	5–0		0–0	2–1	0–1
Sun International	0–2	0–2	2–1	1–2	1–0	3–1	0–1	2–2	2–1	3–1	1–1	1–1	0–2		3–1	3–3
HKFYG	0–5	0–5	0–6	0–3	0–2	2–0	1–4	1–5	1–1	1–5	1–1	0–6	0–3	0–1		2–6
Wing Go Fu Moon	0–3	1–1	1–0	3–0	2–1	4–2	2–3	3–0	2–0	0–1	0–3	1–2	1–1	4–1	3–1	

Source: Hong Kong Football Association
Legend: Blue = home team win; Yellow = draw; Red = away team win.
