= Central & Western District R&SA =

Central & Western
- Full name: The Central and Western District Recreation and Sports Association
- Founded: 2002; 24 years ago
- Ground: Happy Valley Recreation Ground
- President: Lai Tat Sang
- Manager: Fung Chung Ting
- League: Hong Kong First Division
- 2025–26: First Division, 7th of 14
- Website: https://www.facebook.com/CWDFC/
Home colours	Away colours

The Central and Western District Recreation and Sports Association (Chinese: 中西區康樂體育會), known simply as Central & Western, is a Hong Kong football club based in Central and Western District, one of the 18 districts of Hong Kong. The team currently competes in the Hong Kong First Division.

The club's home matches are played at Happy Valley Recreation Ground and various other grounds as there are no suitable grounds in Central and Western District.

== History ==
In the 2002–03 season, the Hong Kong Football Association reformed the Hong Kong Second Division and the Hong Kong Third Division. The association suggested that each of the different district councils form their own football team based in its district. The Central and Western District Council therefore complied and entered a team in that season's Hong Kong Third District Division League, the bottom tier of the Hong Kong football league pyramid.

In the 2012–13 season, the club finished 8th in the Hong Kong Fourth Division, and in the 2013–14 season, the club finished 3rd in the final season of the Fourth Division before it was renamed the Third Division. The club has finished 2nd in the Third Division in the 2014–15 season, but it was not promoted for unknown reasons.

Following a 2nd-place finish in the 2015–16 season, the club was promoted to the Hong Kong Second Division. The club has also reached Round 3 of the 2015-16 Hong Kong FA Cup preliminary round, getting knocked out by Wanchai 2–1.

In the 2016–17 season, Central & Western started the season with a 14-game unbeaten run in all competitions before falling to Sun Hei in the Quarter-final of the HKFA Cup preliminary round. They scored two thumping victories against Kwong Wah, once 6–0 in the league and the other 4–0 in the HKFA Cup preliminary round. Their unbeaten run lasted from September to March for 15 games in the league, before being beaten by eventual champions Sparta Rotterdam Mutual 1–0 in Happy Valley and Lucky Mile 2–0 in the next game. However, the club missed out a second promotion in 2 years by +2 goal difference from Hoi King which also finished with 43 points.

In the 2017–18 season, the club achieved promotion to the Hong Kong First Division by coming second in the league with 51 points, 5 more than third place Tuen Mun.

In the 2022–23 season, the club achieved the "Lower League Double", by winning the Hong Kong First Division League and the FA Cup Junior Division in the same season. However, they denied promotion to the Hong Kong Premier League due to financial difficulties.

== Coaching staff ==
Position	Staff
Manager	(Hong Kong) Fung Chung Ting

== Current Squad ==
=== First Team ===
As of 22 September 2025

Note: Flags indicate national team as defined under FIFA eligibility rules; some limited exceptions apply. Players may hold more than one non-FIFA nationality.

No.	Pos.	Nation	Player
1	GK	HKG	Ho Cheuk Him
3	DF	BRA	Alysson
4	MF	HKG	Shu Kitamura
5	DF	HKG	Chan Cheuk Hei
7	DF	HKG	Cheung Chun Hin
8	MF	HKG	Wong Hin Chung
10	FW	GHA	Yussif Bamie Mubashir
11	FW	HKG	Chan Yiu Yin
13	MF	HKG	Tang Kong Haang
16	DF	HKG	Ng Cheuk Kiu
17	MF	HKG	Lau Pui Wah

No.	Pos.	Nation	Player
19	GK	HKG	Wong Ho Hin
20	DF	HKG	Sham Yiu Yeung
25	MF	HKG	Lam Wan Kit
28	DF	HKG	Chung Man Tsun (captain)
31	GK	HKG	Wong Tsz Him
47	FW	HKG	Hardikpreet Singh
88	FW	HKG	Liu Wai Yeung
92	FW	HKG	Dwain Baxter
94	DF	HKG	Cheung Ho Hay
99	FW	BRA	Allan Aniz

== Honours ==
=== League ===
- Hong Kong First Division
  - Champions (1): 2022–23

=== Cup Competitions ===
- Hong Kong FA Cup Junior Division
  - Champions (2): 2022–23, 2023–24
