= Hong Kong Federation of Youth Groups =

Non-profit organization in Hong Kong

The Hong Kong Federation of Youth Groups
- 香港青年協會
- Other names: HKFYG, FYG
- Type: Non-governmental organisation
- Established: 1960; 66 years ago
- Location: 21/F, The Hong Kong Federation of Youth Groups Building, 21 Pak Fuk Road, North Point, Hong Kong
- Website: www.hkfyg.org.hk

Hong Kong Federation of Youth Groups
- Traditional Chinese: 香港青年協會
- Simplified Chinese: 香港青年协会
Transcriptions

The Hong Kong Federation of Youth Groups (or HKFYG, Chinese: 香港青年協會) is a non-profit organization in Hong Kong, committed to developing youth services. Founded in 1960, the Federation has since been involved in providing activities and facilities for the physical, social, educational, cultural development of Hong Kong's youth.

Their services can be divided into 12 core areas. Each year, HKFYG offers more than 10,000 activities organized by over 60 service units with 5 million participants annually. The HKFYG also took an active role in anti-drug campaigns in secondary schools in Hong Kong. They have made 30,000 "Anti-drug in School Resources Packs" and distributed them to secondary schools. "Decoding Life" is also a new counseling service provided by HKFYG. It helps teenagers to avoid group violence and teaches them conflict handling skills.

== Mission and objectives ==
The goal of HKFYG is to help young people to fully live their potential and develop well physically, socially, educationally and culturally. They accomplish this by setting up helping and caring networks, launching various activities and participating in educational work. Innovative facilities and services are constantly updated to meet the ever-changing trends and hence best accommodate teenagers need.

HKFYG also wants to raise the public awareness concerning issues about teenagers. They have published magazines every half year reporting the findings of the research on the latest phenomena or trends among young people.

== History ==
=== Establishment ===
The Hong Kong Federation of Youth Groups was founded in 1960 by George Stokes, who was sent to Hong Kong by the British Christian Welfare Council to develop local youth services. Later in 1962, it was officially established as a society registered under the Societies Ordinance (Cap 151). In the first decade, the organization mainly collaborated with other youth organizations in delivering youth services.

The Federation was incorporated in 1970 under the Provisions of the Companies Ordinance.

=== Development ===
==== 1970s and 1980s ====
In 1970, the Youth Counselling Centre was established, targeting young people with emotional and adjustment problems. Three service units, School Social Work, Outreaching Social Work, and Family Life Education, also came into full service in the late 1970s. The Federation's Constitution was revised in 1981. Several China and overseas youth exchange projects and study tours were launched since the mid-1980s to enhance the young people's understanding towards China and their international exposures. In 1989, the self-financed Tsuen Wan Indoor Sports Centre, a joint venture with the Hong Kong Housing Society, was established.

==== The 1990s ====
In 1993, Youthline (關心一線) was officially set up by the organization. It is the first ever counseling hotline service in Hong Kong, subvented by the Government. In 1996, two small group homes (兒童之家) were established to provide rehabilitation services for mildly mentally handicapped children and teenagers between the ages of 6 and 18. In 1998, the territory-wide Youth Volunteer Network was established to promote volunteerism among young people. The Federation began a modernization process to its youth centres since the late 1990s.

==== The 2000s (decade) ====
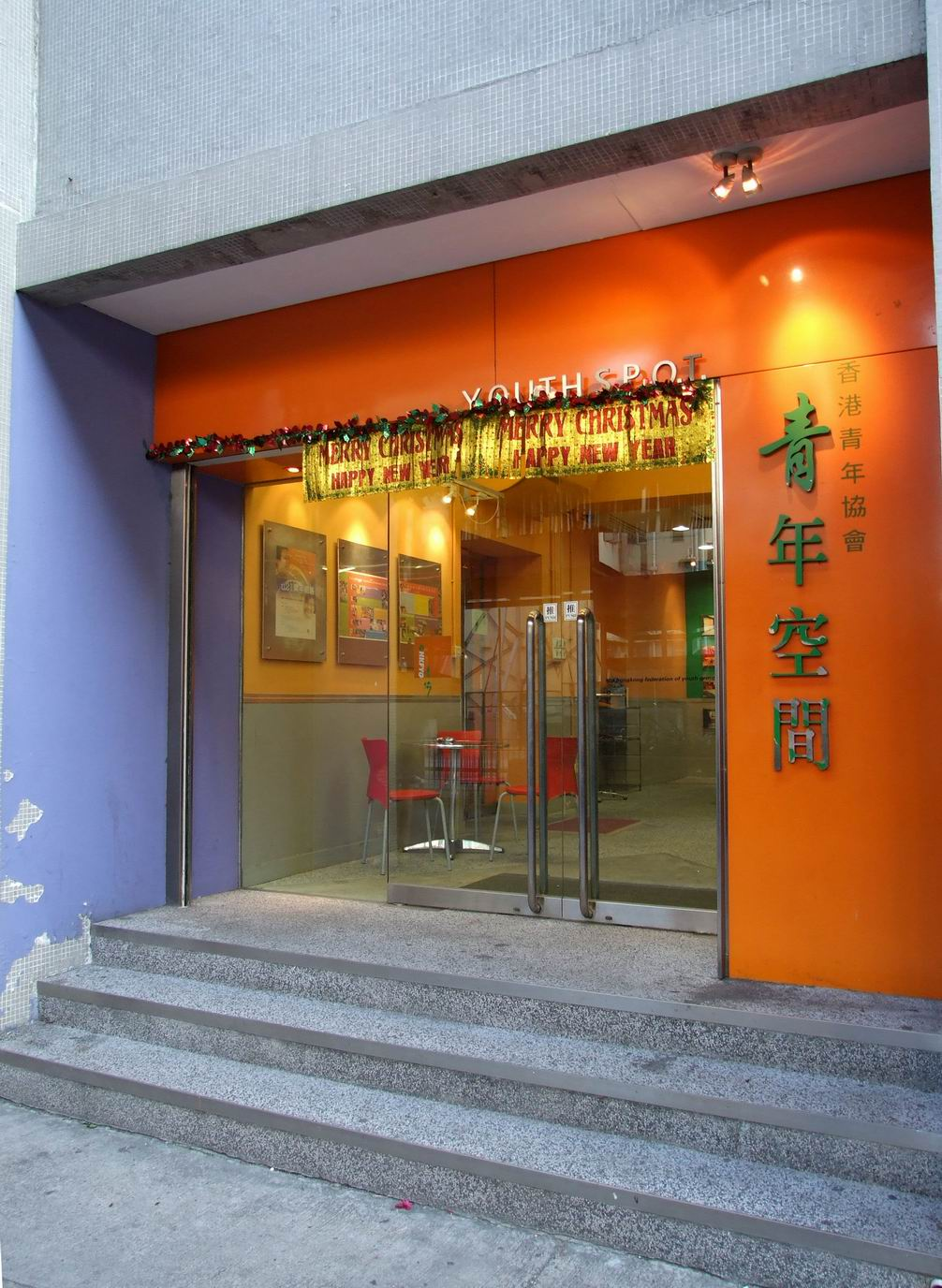
Jockey Club Farm Road Youth S.P.O.T.

The Dragon Foundation was jointly established by the Federation, the Home Affairs Bureau of HKSAR (traditional Chinese: 民政事務局), and the Home Affairs Department (traditional Chinese:民政事務總署) in 2000, with the vision to facilitate networks among Chinese youth worldwide.

In the same year, Leadership 21 was established to offer a variety of comprehensive leadership training programmes for young people. In 2002, all youth centres, teenager centres and integrated youth service centres were renamed Youth S.P.O.T. (traditional Chinese: 青年空間), meaning the Space for Participation, Opportunities and Training. On 29 May 2004, the organization hosted its first ever Flag Day. The Hong Kong Melody Makers (香港旋律), a youth choir, was formed in the same year with sponsorship from The Dragon Foundation.

Education

Two schools were built under the Federation with donation from Lee Shau-kee. The first primary school began in 2000, the Hong Kong Federation of Youth Groups Lee Shau Kee Primary School (香港青年協會李兆基小學), located in Tin Shui Wai. The second school, the Hong Kong Federation of Youth Groups Lee Shau Kee College (香港青年協會李兆基書院), was opened on 26 April 2006 as an English medium DSS school.

On 19 December 2008, its 28-storey headquarters, the Hong Kong Federation of Youth Groups Building (香港青年協會大廈) located on Pak Fuk Road, North Point, was officially opened. Later in the year, the Federation started its quarterly journal, Youth Hong Kong.

== The Hong Kong Federation of Youth Groups Building ==
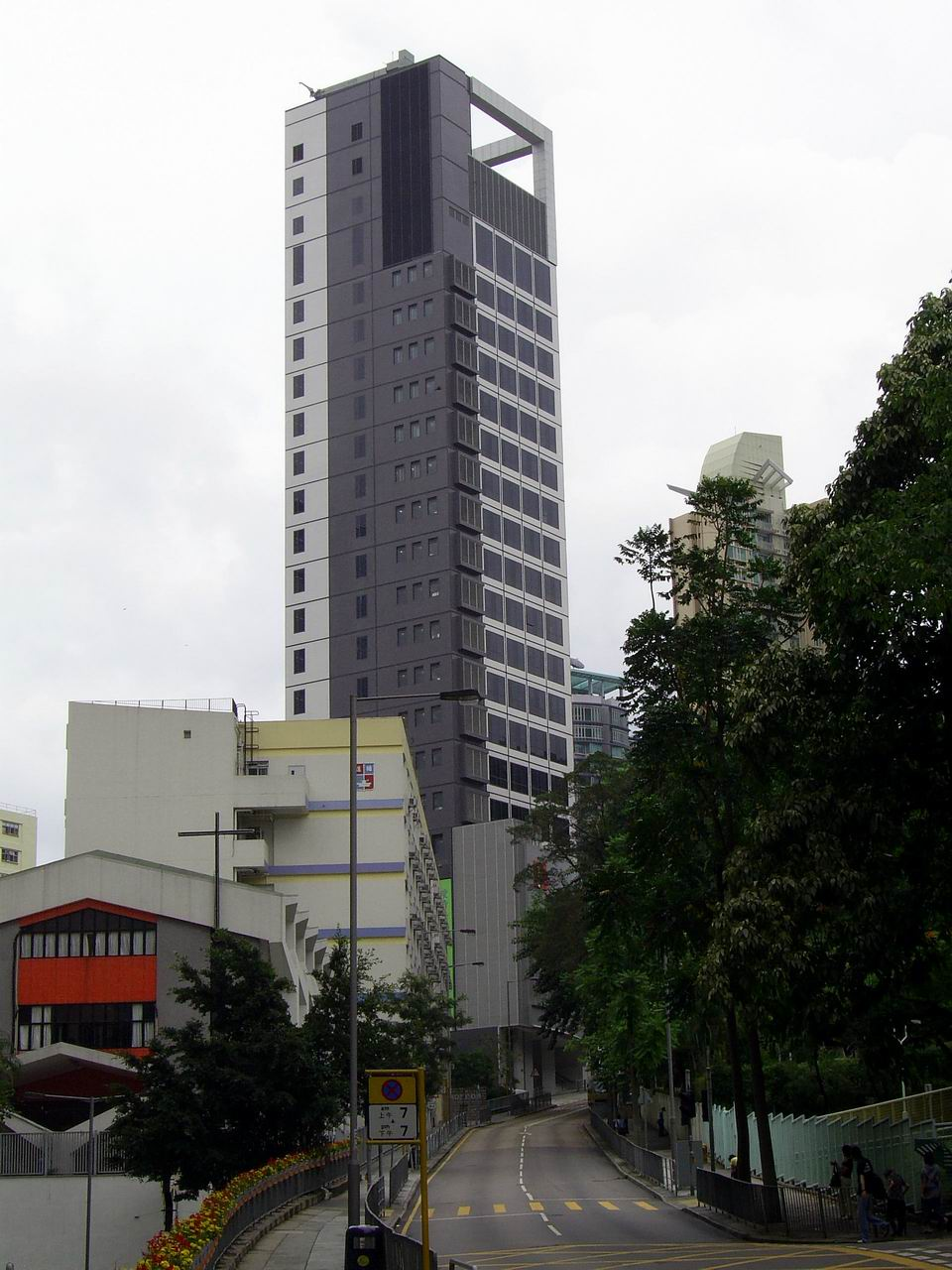
The Hong Kong Federation of Youth Groups Building

The Hong Kong Federation of Youth Groups Building (traditional chinese:香港青年協會大廈; abbr.:青協大廈) is a 28-storey social service complex located on 21 Pak Fuk Road, North Point, Hong Kong, next to the Quarry Bay MTR station. The opening ceremony was held on 19 December 2008.

The Building accommodates the Hong Kong Federation of Youth Groups Head Office, as well as some sub-units of the Social Welfare Department and head offices of 9 other social service agencies and organisations. It is equipped with various facilities and amenities, including a 434-seat auditorium, two multi-function theatres, a multi-media youth and children’s learning centre, meeting rooms, as well as the Café 21, the first Youth Social Enterprise Project launched by the Federation. The facilities are available to social service organizations and the public for booking.

== Structure ==
=== Patrons, advisors and the council ===
Position	Information of the responsible person
Patron	John Lee Ka-chiu (traditional Chinese: 李家超), GBM SBS PDSM PMSM; Chief Executive of the Hong Kong Special Administrative Region
Senior Adviser	Dr. Rosanna Wong Yick-Ming (traditional Chinese: 王䓪鳴), DBE JP
Adviser to the Mainland Affairs Office	Andy Ho Wing-Cheong (traditional Chinese: 何永昌), MH

The Council consists of the President, Vice President, Honorary Treasurer, Honorary Secretary, Executive Director, Deputy Executive Directors and Members.

=== Committee members ===
The nine Committees of the Federation are:

- Youth Service Advisory Committee
- Audit Committee
- Committee on the Provident Fund for the Federation
- Committee on the Federation-Staff Contributory Medical Scheme
- ICT Committee
- Board of Advisers of the Hong Kong Federation of Youth Groups' Lee Shau Kee Youth Exchange Fund
- Incorporated Management Committee of the HKFYG Lee Shau Kee Primary School
- School Management Committee of the HKFYG Lee Shau Kee College
- School Management Committee of HKFYG Kindergartens

The Committee members are responsible for different area of the Federation to maintain its operation.

=== Membership ===
There are different kind of membership, including child, youth, senior and parent. After registered as a member, people can get involved into a wide range of activities and services. They can also receive bi-weekly publications to update the news of the organisation. Outstanding members and volunteers will be nominated to participate in local and overseas competitions and exchange programmes.

== Services ==
The Federation focuses on providing 12 core services with more than 60 units in operation.

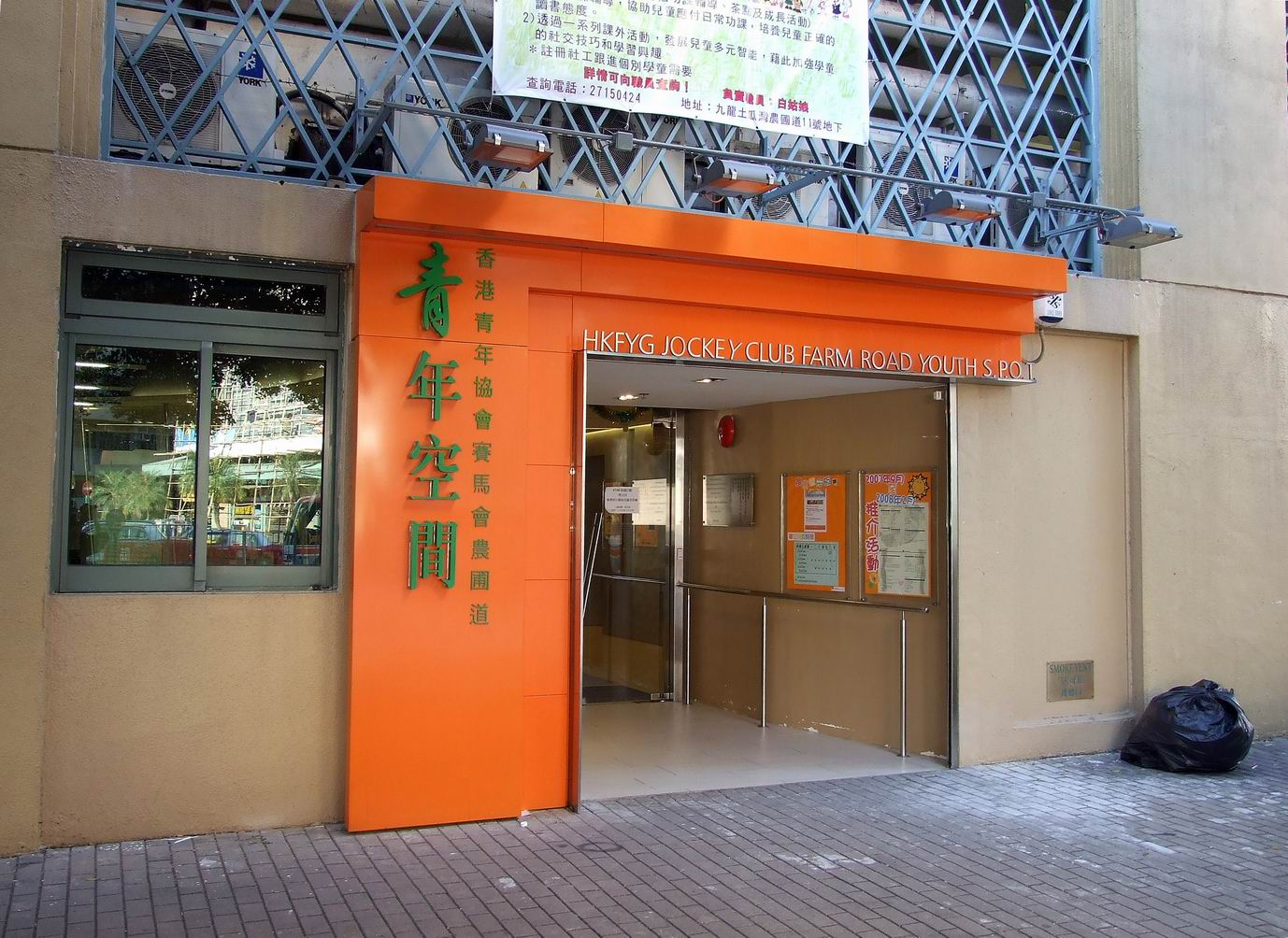

=== Youth S.P.O.Ts ===
The HKFYG has 22 Youth S.P.O.Ts (traditional chinese: 青年空間) . These youth centres provide space and opportunity to learn and develop. They focus on Strengthening Classroom Learning, Continuous Learning Opportunities and Experiential Learning in a Societal Context, offering tailor-made programmes in combination with other provided services. Each Youth S.P.O.T. is equipped with both an M21@Youth S.P.O.T. station to facilitate development in creativity and enhance interactions with the community through social media, as well as a LEAD Lab to provide a platform to learning through engineering, art and design.

The NEIGHBOURHOOD First project (traditional chinese: 鄰舍第一) has become a core component of community-based services through the S.P.O.Ts, while the Community Team Sports project encourages young people to get physical by participating in sporting activities and learning the values that come with team play.

=== M21 multimedia services ===
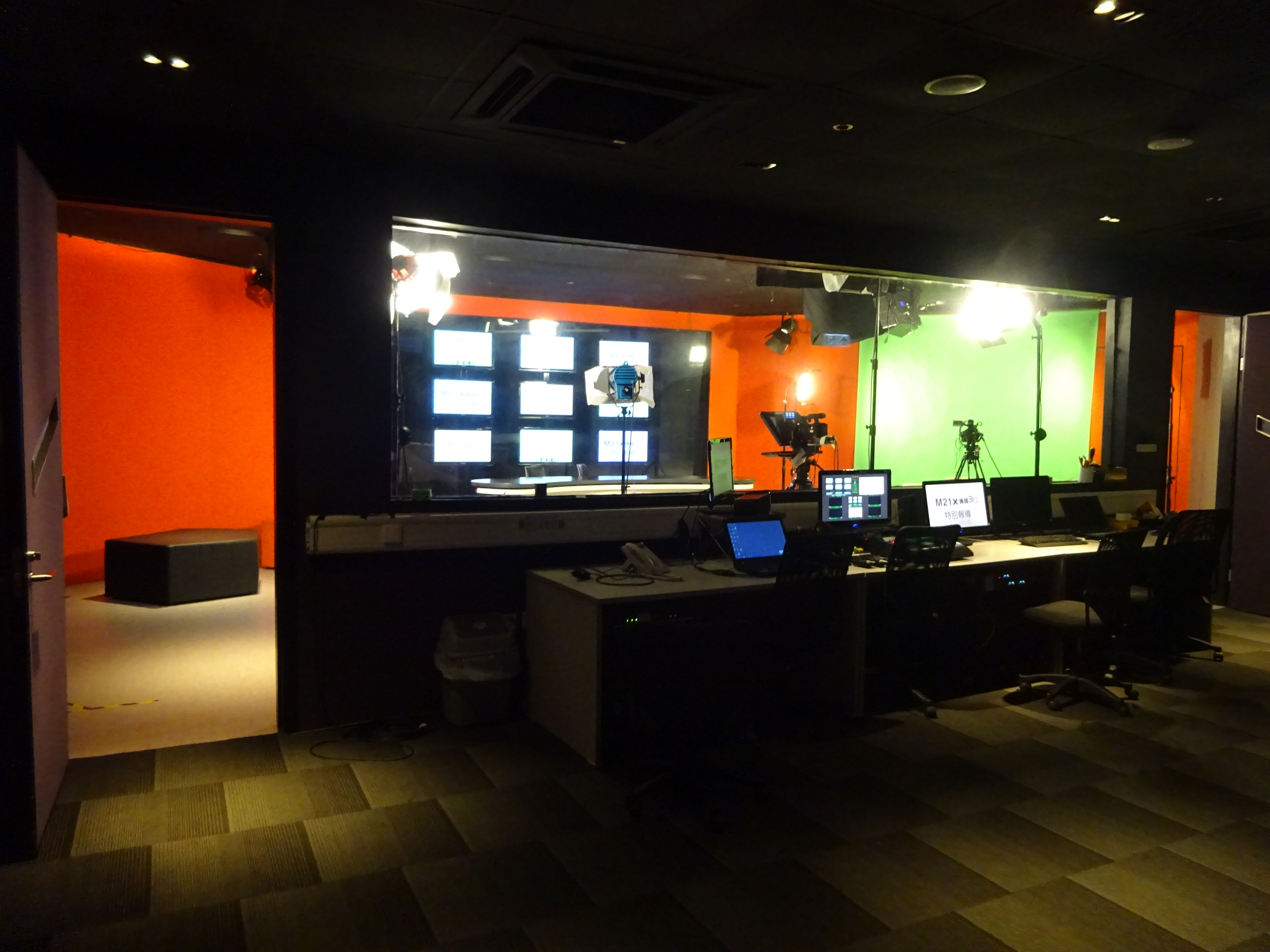

By using the Internet, social and new media, the HKFYG connects with young people on their terms and through their chosen mode of communication. M21.hk (traditional Chinese: M21媒體空間) is a multimedia centre with the slogan, “It’s all about YOUth” and consists of the Media Lab, the Media Academy and Media Broadcast. The M21 Youth Production Team gives young people a wide platform for imagination and innovation, and offers them hands-on operational experience in production, which is then screened through the M21 Internet Radio and TV, a broadcast network linked up with campus TV and community channels for the public.

=== Sports, leisure and cultural services ===
- Sports Centre, Camp & Outdoor Centres

The Tsuen Wan Indoor Sports Centre was established in 1989 as a joint venture with the Hong Kong Housing Society. The centre concentrates on nine series of training courses for its members, which included sports, dancing, music, wushu, academics, information technology, experiential learning, language development and creativity programmes for children. Two Outdoor Activities Centres were built in Tai Mei Tuk and Stanley for daytime activities. Two camp sites, Lamma Youth Camp and Jockey Club Sai Kung Outdoor Training Camp, are provided with accommodation.

- The Hong Kong Melody Makers

The HKFYG (The Hong Kong Melody Makers) (香港旋律)is a youth choir formed in 2004 by the Federation with sponsorship from The Dragon Foundation. The team consists of several small a cappella ensembles. In 2009, members of the choir won the 3rd Asian Youth A Cappella Singing Competition in South Korea.

- Hong Kong Youth Dance

The HKFYG Hong Kong Youth Dance (香港起舞) was formed in 2008, with a focus on hip hop, jazz funk and modern dance. The dancers are of ages between 15 and 25.

=== Counseling ===
The Federation provides various counseling services, including hotline, face-to-face, web-based counseling and school-based social workers services.

- Counseling Centre

The Youth Counseling Centre was established since the foundation of the Federation. It is now located on 5th floor in the HKFYG Building. Counsellors are professionally trained social workers, offering support through the telephone (Youthline) or the internet (MSN).

- Youthline 27778899

Youthline is the first ever hotline counselling service provided in Hong Kong. It was set up by the Youth Counseling Centre in 1993, funded by the Social Welfare Department.

- Centre for Internet Addiction

Seeing that the internet has become a fundamental element of teenagers' lives, the Federation set up the Centre for Internet Addiction to promote a healthy habit on using the Internet. A student supporting campaign was launched from 2006 to 2008 to help the Internet-addicts. "Play Wiser" was the slogan of the campaign, meaning Well-balanced, Intellectual, Safe, Executive and Rejoice.

- Gambling Counseling Centre

Legalization of soccer gambling in Hong Kong leads to an increase in the number of gamblers. As a result, the Center was established on 1 February 2007 with monetary sponsorship from Ping Wo Fund of the Home Affairs Bureau to provide counselling and treatment services to pathological gamblers and their families members. In addition, it is to promote the anti-gambling to the public, particularly the youth, to prevent them from addicting to gamble and to develop a healthy life by offering different activities. Community program and outreach services are conducted to care for the needy.

- Student Guidance Team

The program is started in 2002 to provide in-school counseling service in primary schools.

- School Social Work Unit

Students from 38 schools in Hong Kong have received counseling service from the School Social Work Unit and in 11 Youth S.P.O.T in 2006-2007. It is responsible to solve students' problems on personal, family and academic problems while to assist the schools in offering learning opportunities and teaching materials to students to widen their horizon. Paths to Adulthood is a 3-year program co-organized by the Federation, The Hong Kong Jockey Club Charity Trust, Social Welfare Department and Education Bureau. The program appoints 5 local universities to research on a sustainable all-rounded youth development program in order to provide an improved service to secondary schools' students. Besides, teachers, parents and social workers are trained to help develop the potential of the youth.

=== Services for youth at risk ===
Under the Outreaching Social Work Unit are the two social work teams (外展社工隊):

- Tsuen Wan and Kwai Chung Outreaching Social Work Team
- Sai Kung and Wong Tai Sin Outreaching Social Work Team

They target at vulnerable youth who need immediate attention and help, dealing with their personal, emotional, family, academic, employment, drug and gambling problems. Extended Service for Young Night Difters is also provided by the Unit. The Youth Support Scheme (青年支援服務計劃) specifically provides counselling for those who have been cautioned under the Police Superintendents' Discretionary Scheme (警司警誡|警司警誡令計劃).

=== Education services ===
- Schools

The Federation has established two kindergartens, a primary school and a secondary school to provide education services. The two Ching Lok Kindergarten cum Nursery (traditional Chinese: 青樂幼稚園 及 幼兒園) were founded in 1997 in Sai Wan Ho and 1999 in Yau Ma Tei. Day nurseries and occasional child care service are provided.
In April 2008, the Kindergarten in Yau Ma Tei was advised to suspend classes for one week upon receiving reports of 47 students and one staff having fever with respiratory and gastrointestinal symptoms amidst outbreaks of influenza.

The primary school founded in 2002, the Lee Shau Kee Primary School (香港青年協會李兆基小學), is located in Tin Shui Wai. The secondary school, Lee Shau Kee College (香港青年協會李兆基書院), is an English medium DSS school opened in 2006. Both schools were built with funding from Lee Shau-kee.

- Learning Centre

The Continuous Learning Centre (traditional chinese: 持續進修中心) is located in Youth S.P.O.T. 21 inside the HKFYG Building. The centre promotes lifelong education and gives young people a continuous learning platform.

=== Youth employment ===
The Youth Employment Network (traditional chinese: 青年就業網絡) came into service in 2003, organizing career expos and is setting up youth social enterprises.

- YPTP‧YWETS (traditional chinese:「展翅‧青見計劃」). YPTP stands for Youth Pre-employment Training Programme, and YWETS stands for Youth Work experience and Training Scheme.
- Hong Kong Youth Programme (YBHK, 香港青年創業計劃) was launched in July 2005 based on the model of Youth Business International. It is jointly launched by the Federation, the government authority, professional bodies, the academia, the legal sector and the financial sector, offering up to HK$100,000 interest-free loan and mentoring to youngsters planning to start their own business. The programme is highly appreciated by the public and the professional bodies.

=== Leadership training ===
Leadership 21 (traditional chinese:青年領袖發展中心) came into operation in April 2000. During the 9 past years, over 57,000 local students have participated in the leadership training programmes organized by the center. The center has been commissioned by various government bureaus, tertiary institutions and private corporation to organize such programmes.

In 2006, the Hong Kong 200 Leadership Project was launched. 200 student leaders will be selected every year and receiving intensive training in Hong Kong and on the mainland.

=== Creativity education and youth exchange ===
Every year, the Federation organized a number of international and regional schemes, competitions and exchange programmes to encourage youngsters to be creative and fulfill their potential, including:

- The Hong Kong Odyssey of the Mind Programme
- The Hong Kong Student Science Project Competition
- The Hong Kong Young Ambassador Scheme
- The creativity education programme LEAD (Learning through Engineering, Art and Design), (創意科藝工程計劃)

Youth Exchange Unit Over the past 20 years, hundreds of exchange programmes and study tours have been organized to the Mainland under the "Discovering the Dragon" series, and to overseas countries under the "Discovering the World" series, providing opportunities for young people to understand China and to build up global vision.

The Hong Kong Federation of Youth Groups' Lee Shau Kee Youth Exchange Fund is set up as a separate trust to promote and finance exchange activities for young people.

=== Parenting service ===
Six Family Life Education Units (家庭生活教育組) are established in Kowloon City, Tai Po, Yuen Long, Wanchai, and Kwai Tsing. The Units intend to create harmonious and loving relationships among family members by teaching them communication skills and giving them support. Mediation will be employed in emergency situations.

The HKFYG Parent-child Mediation Centre is situated in Tin Yuet Estate, Tin Shui Wai in Yuen Long District.

=== Research and publications ===
To assure a deep understanding of teenagers, the Federation established a research centre that runs polls and studies. Reports are constantly released regarding topical issues and over 200 reports have been released up till now. The topics vary from the healthy life style of young people to the employment problem of them.

Youth Hong Kong is a journal published by the Federation every three months. It provides medium for the public to discuss, debate, analyze and voice their opinion on youth's issues.

=== Volunteer services ===
The Youth Volunteer Network is established in 1998. Its aim is to promote the development of territory-wide volunteer service in Hong Kong and to encourage young people to participate in voluntary work. More than 110,000 young people have registered to be the member of this network. 4 million hours of voluntary service hour have been accumulated throughout the years. Different kinds of services and training programs are offered by the Federation.

== Volunteer program ==
=== Background ===
With a demand for all-rounded development of the youth, volunteer services are getting popular in Hong Kong to help establish the moral standard of teenagers. Many non-profit making organizations set up volunteer programs to provide them opportunities to broaden horizon. The Federation set up the Youth Volunteer Network in 1998 to meet the needs of the societal development. In 2005, the Network was sponsored by the Hong Kong Jockey Club Charities Trust and was renamed as Hong Kong Jockey Club Community Project Grant- Youth Volunteer Network.

=== Objective ===
The program is to encourage a social involvement of the youth. Through participating in the Network, they can contribute to society and to serve the district by giving hands to the needy. By joining different kinds of activities organized by the Federation of Hong Kong Youth Groups or other affiliated clubs, the youth can develop a healthy social life and to balance their time between studies and pastime.

=== Target group ===
The program mainly recruits participants aged between 6 and 35. Under a similar societal background between volunteers and the activities participants, a friendly relationship is formed by mutually sharing their own experience. Interest persons can register as volunteers from different units of the Federation such as the U21, a subsidiary of the Federation.

To enlarge the volunteer base, volunteers are also recruited from educational institutions, such as kindergartens, primary schools, secondary schools, tertiary educational institutions, and the corporate. This is a way to form a link between the Federation and numerous societal organizations.

=== Activities participated ===
In order to make the program interesting, a flexible system and network is built to provide all kinds of activities for the youth to choose from according to their interests, time and skills. Volunteers join on a continuing basis from small-scale to large scale activities with all ranges in the Network. as volunteers to serve the guests and performers from different countries to share their interests.

Some international volunteers programs are also provided.

=== Reward system ===
A reward system was set up to recognize the effort made by the youth volunteer. The number of the service hours is the criterion to evaluate the performance of the volunteers. Volunteers contributing the most in term of time will be awarded in an annual event called the Annual Volunteer Awarding Ceremony (Traditional Chinese「活得出色」義工嘉許計劃). Besides, they are nominated as the youth ambassadors to share their experience in providing voluntary service in school assembly to promote the spirit and encourage a wider participation of students.

=== Development ===
The program has accumulated more than 100,000 participants providing over 4,000,000 hours of service. On average, 500,000 hours are provided each year from volunteers. More than 300 organizations have joined the program as affiliated members.

The program develops certain sub-programs to specifically cater for different participants. Experts working in the program organize training courses for volunteer teams of private companies, government departments and public corporations such as Motorola, Citic Ka Wah Bank, Hong Kong Cable Television Limited and Rating and Valuation Department to teach volunteer management and improve the quality of the program, motivating teenagers with a heart to serve the public.

Schools and organizations can join as the Friends of VNET (VNET之友)or Heart-to-Heart Project (Traditional Chinese: 有心計劃) to show a commitment to organizing students or employees to serve the society not less than 2,000 hours or to donate money for carrying out community activities. During the outbreak of SARS in 2003, Tsunami in South Asia in 2004, Sichuan Earthquake in 2008, etc. are examples of volunteers in Hong Kong to giving help to those affected places.

== Activities ==
Apart from service, there are various types of activities organised by the Federation for its members. There are over 60 service units organizing more than 10,000 activities every year with 5 million participants involved. Some example of the activities:

=== Talks and Sharings ===
Talks and Sharing have been held to boarden the horizons of the members. Famous professionals such as Mr TSANG Chun-wah (Financial Secretary of HKSAR Government), Li Ning (gymnast), Tung Chee-hwa (The first Chief Executive of HKSAR Government), Henry Tang Ying-yen (Chief Secretary of HKSAR Government) and Jasper Tsang Yok-sing (President of Legislative Council) are invited to give sharings and talks. By giving introductions on their professions, awareness of social issues and public affairs of the participants can be enhanced.

=== Forums ===
Forums are held to provide a communicating platform for teenagers or other members to discuss issues. Topics usually cover public affairs or social issues, e.g. drug abuse problem, the potential development of our country, the opportunities of nowadays teenagers, to give a chance participants to develop their analytical mindset and critical thinking skills in different aspect of those issues.

=== Scholarships ===
Scholarship that encouraged teenagers to pursuit further studies (「香港青年協會黃寬洋青少年進修獎勵計劃」) are provided by HKFYG, which also praise the positive attitude of teenagers to pursuit their dreams and goals. The scholarship start its function since 1997 and sponsor students who reach the requirements.

=== Competitions ===
Competitions like Anti-Drug-Abuse Song Writing Competition (Cheer & Music in 2010), a Tug of Charity war (拔．施愛心慈善拔河賽 in 2007) and English Speech Delivery Competition (薈英社國際英語演講比賽總決賽 in 2007) are held. to promote healthy and positive message to the society. The target group of participants of the competitions are often teenagers, which also suits the target service group of HKFYG.
