= Hoi King SA =

Hong Kong football club

Hoi King
- Full name: Hoi King Sports Association Limited
- Founded: 2015; 11 years ago
- Stadium: Tsing Yi Northeast Park
- President: Lo King Yau
- Head Coach: Fung Hoi Man
- League: Hong Kong First Division
- 2025–26: First Division, 6th of 14
- Website: https://www.facebook.com/Hoikingsports/
Home colours	Away colours

Hoi King Sports Association (Chinese: 凱景體育會) is a Hong Kong football club which currently competes in the Hong Kong First Division.

== History ==
Founded in 2015, the club's name is derived from its founders Fung Hoi Man and Lo King Yau. Since its beginnings, the club has recruited students from the Diocesan Boys' School to form the core of its squad.

The club's first official match occurred on 6 September 2015 against fellow Hong Kong Third Division side, Sun International. The match resulted in a 2–1 debut victory for Hoi King. During the last match of the season on 22 May 2016, Hoi King managed a draw against Central & Western, ensuring that Hoi King would own the tiebreaker between the two clubs based on head-to-head results. This result allowed Hoi King to clinch the Third Division title in their maiden season.

During the 2016–17 season, the club finished level with Central & Western on points, but once again won the head-to-head tiebreaker. As a result, Hoi King finished as runners up in the Hong Kong Second Division and clinched their second successive promotion in as many years.

In April 2018, the club applied for promotion to the Hong Kong Premier League. On 24 May, despite an 8th-place finish in the First Division, the Hong Kong Football Association accepted Hoi King's application to join the HKPL for the 2018–19 season. This became the club's first-ever appearance in the top-flight league of Hong Kong.

In April 2019, after losing to R&F, the club was confirmed to finish at the bottom of the Hong Kong Premier League and was relegated to the Hong Kong First Division League for the next season.

In the 2022–23 season, Hoi King finished 2nd in the Hong Kong FA Cup Junior Division, after losing 2–1 to Central and Western District in the final. They also played teams like Pegasus and KCDRSC in the competition.

== Team staff ==
Position	Staff
Head coach	(Hong Kong) Fung Hoi Man
Assistant coach	(Hong Kong) Tung Ho Yin
Assistant coach	(Hong Kong) Wu Chung Man

== Honours ==
=== League ===
- Hong Kong Third Division
  - Champions (1): 2015–16
