= Mutual FC =

Sparta Asia
- Full name: Branded: Sparta Asia Football Club; Legal: Mutual Football Club
- Founded: 1993; 33 years ago
- Ground: Various
- President: Rosa Chi
- Head coach: Lawrence Akandu
- League: Hong Kong Third Division
- 2025–26: Second Division, 16th of 16 (relegated)

Sparta Asia Football Club (Chinese: 淦源足球會) is a Hong Kong football club currently competing in the Hong Kong Third Division.

== History ==
During the 2008–09 season, it once competed in the top-tier Hong Kong First Division, and was relegated after finishing 12th out of 13 teams.

At the end of the 2010–11 season, after gaining promotion to the First Division from the runner-up position in the Second Division, it withdrew from the First Division and was expunged from the Hong Kong league system by the HKFA. IT rejoined the league system and competed in the Fourth Division in the 2012–13 season.

In 2015, the Asia football academy of the Dutch Eredivisie club Sparta Rotterdam took charge of the club and it rebranded as Sparta Rotterdam Mutual FC. The partnership ended after 2018. It was revived in 2019 when the club was rebranded as Sparta Asia.

Old crest of the club as Mutual FC.

== Name history ==
- 1993–2005: Mutual (淦源)
- 2005–2006: Korchina (韓中)
- 2006–2010: Mutual (淦源)
- 2010–2011: Pontic (港迪)
- 2011–2015: Mutual (淦源)
- 2015–2018: Sparta Rotterdam Mutual (鹿特丹斯巴達(淦源))
- 2018–: Mutual (淦源)
- 2019–: Sparta Asia (斯巴達亞洲)

== Honours ==
=== League ===
- Hong Kong Second Division
  - Champions (2): 2007–08, 2016–17
- Hong Kong Third Division
  - Champions (1): 1996–97

=== Cup competitions ===
- Hong Kong Junior Shield
  - Champions (1): 2000–01

== Recent seasons ==
Season	Name	League	Pos.	Pl.	W	D	L	GS	GA	P	Hong Kong FA Cup Junior Division	Notes
2014–15	Mutual	Div 3	2	22	14	5	3	63	18	47	Round 3	
2015–16	Sparta Rotterdam Mutual	Div 3	3	22	13	6	3	39	18	45	Quarterfinals	
2016–17	Sparta Rotterdam Mutual	Div 2	1	22	16	2	4	43	18	50	Round 2	Promoted to First Division
2017–18	Sparta Rotterdam Mutual	Div 1	2	30	15	7	8	59	39	52	Quarterfinals	
