= Wanchai SF =

Wan Chai
- Full name: Wanchai Sports Federation
- Founded: 2002
- Ground: Happy Valley Recreation Ground
- President: Martin Hong
- Head Coach: Ku Kam Fai
- League: Hong Kong Third Division
- 2025–26: Second Division, 4th of 16
- Website: https://www.hkfa.com/en/club/53/detail/
Home colours	Away colours

Wanchai Sports Federation (Chinese: 灣仔足球隊) is a football club which currently plays in the Hong Kong Second Division League. The club is operated by the Wan Chai District Council.

The club plays its home matches at Happy Valley Recreation Ground.

== History ==
In 2002, the Hong Kong Football Association introduced the Hong Kong Third District Division League, which was formed by teams operating by each District Council of Hong Kong. Wanchai was one of 11 clubs to join the league in the first season.

The club did not perform well since they were formed as they were usually placing at the bottom half of league table. In the 2008–09 season, the club were placed at the bottom of the table among 15 teams, only had won one match (vs Wong Tai Sin, originally lost 0–6. However, a suspended player played for Wong Tai Sin in the match. Therefore, Wong Tai Sin was given a 0–3 loss. in 14 matches.

== Recent performance ==
=== Affiliation with South China ===
In 2009, Wanchai SF became the affiliated club of South China. The two teams formed a youth team system, named Wan Chai South China, to compete in the Youth League. The first team did not perform well in the first season of affiliation. They got 4 points in 13 games only, again were the bottom of the league.

Starting from 2010–11 season, South China appointed first team assistant coaches Ku Kam Fai and Chan Chi Hong as the coaches of Wanchai SF. On the other hand, Wanchai signed numerous of ex-First Division player, such as Shum Kwok Pui, Wong Chi Keung. South China Reserves goalkeeper Tin Man Ho also joined the club. These changes had strengthened the team and the team had become a title challenger. After finishing all the 18 league matches they got 43 points, which helped them claim the Third District Division title. In the Third Division final round, Wanchai defeated Eastern, Kwun Tong and KCDRSC to get promoted to the Second Division for the first team in club history.

=== Promotion to Second Division ===
The 2011–12 season was the best ever season in the club history. Being the newly promoted team with any experiences in Hong Kong Second Division, the club had not only kept the players, but also signed more ex-First Division such as Lo Chun Kit and Colly Barnes Ezeh. As an underdog at the beginning of the season, they performed unexpectedly well, having chance to win promotions to the Hong Kong First Division. Although they could not get promoted, they still placed in the fourth place, only 7 points behind Southern, the runner-up of the league which get promoted. They performed well in cup competition too. They defeated Hong Kong Football Club, Fire Services, Shatin and Wing Yee to reach the final of the 2011—12 Hong Kong Junior Shield. Their season culminated in victory over Happy Valley 3–0 to claim the Hong Kong Junior Shield at Hong Kong Stadium on 18 February 2012.

== Honours ==
=== League ===
- Hong Kong Third District Division League
  - Champions: 2010–11
- Hong Kong Junior Shield
  - Champions: 2011–12
