= Hong Kong First Division League =

Second-highest division in men's association football in Hong Kong

Hong Kong First Division
- Founded: 1908; 118 years ago
- Country: Hong Kong
- Confederation: AFC
- Number of clubs: 14 (2025–26)
- Level on pyramid: 2 (2014–); 1 (1908–2014)
- Promotion to: Hong Kong Premier League
- Relegation to: Hong Kong Second Division
- Domestic cup: FA Cup Junior Division
- Current champions: Supreme FC (2025–26)
- Most championships: South China (41 titles)
- Website: hkfa.com
- Current: 2026–27 Hong Kong First Division

The Hong Kong First Division League (Chinese: 香港甲組聯賽) is the second-highest division in the Hong Kong football league system. Established in 1908, it is the third oldest in Asia, after Calcutta and Bombay. Moreover, it is the oldest top-flight league system in Asia. The league was formerly the highest division in Hong Kong until the formation of the Hong Kong Premier League in 2014.

Since 1908, a total of 29 clubs have been crowned champions of the Hong Kong football system. South China are the most successful club, having won 41 times since their first participation in 1941.

== Competition format ==
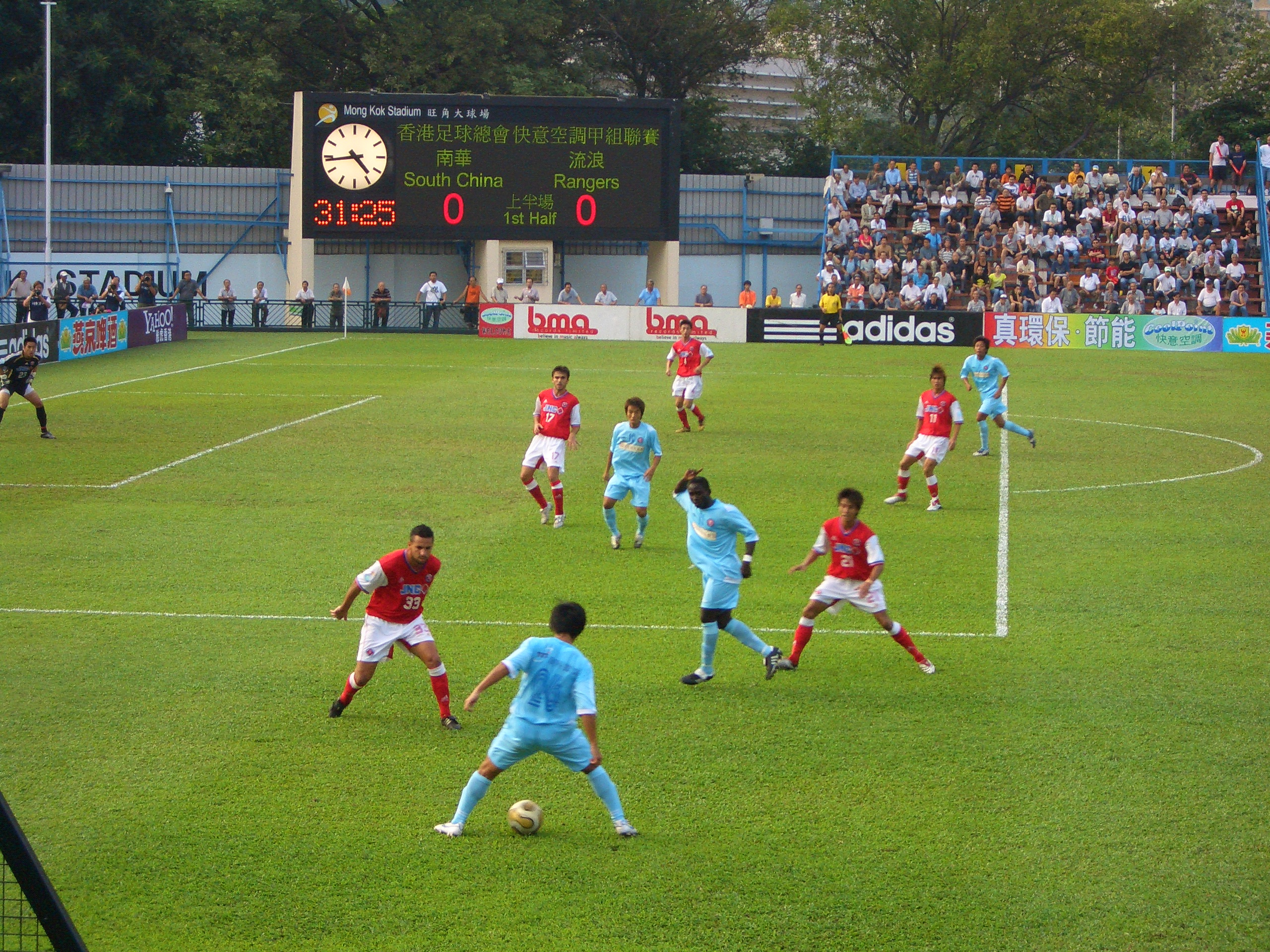
A 2006–07 football match between South China and Rangers in Mong Kok Stadium.

Each team plays the other teams in the division twice, one home and one away game. The ticket profits go to the home team. If there are two matches in the same stadium on the day, the profits are shared between the two home teams.

The top two teams in the league are offered promotion to the Premier League while the bottom two are relegated to the Hong Kong Second Division.

=== Exceptions ===
There were two teams, The Army and The Police, that are not required to be relegated. The league explained that soldiers in The Army team were frequently redeployed to another country and hence it was very difficult to establish teamwork. The Police team were not required to be relegated as they supply the venue Police Sports and Recreation Club for the league.

Another relegation exception was made to South China during the 2006–07 season. The Hong Kong Football Association approved a request from South China to remain in the first division on 14 June 2006. The reason for exception was not disclosed. The public believed that this application was allowed probably because South China has a long history in the First Division League and it would otherwise be humiliating for the club to be relegated to the Second Division. Another reason is that other football clubs rely on the large fan base of South China to generate revenues. Relegation would have resulted in a lose-lose situation for all sides.

== Past winners ==
=== As a 2nd Tier League ===
| Season | Champions | 1st Runner-up | 2nd Runner-up |
|---|---|---|---|
| 2014–15 | Sun Source | HKFC | Southern |
| 2015–16 | Tai Po | HKFC | Sun Hei |
| 2016–17 | Sun Hei | Wong Tai Sin | Wing Yee |
| 2017–18 | HKFC | Shatin | Eastern District |
| 2018–19 | Happy Valley | HKFC | Rangers |
| 2019–20 | Abandoned due to COVID-19 pandemic in Hong Kong | | |
| 2020–21 | HKFC | North District | Sham Shui Po |
| 2021–22 | Abandoned due to COVID-19 pandemic in Hong Kong | | |
| 2022–23 | Central & Western | Kowloon City | North District |
| 2023–24 | Kowloon City | Central & Western | South China |
| 2024–25 | Citizen | Central & Western | Hoi King |
| 2025–26 | Supreme FC | WSE | South China |

== Records ==
=== Undefeated teams ===
Since 1945 (i.e. after World War II, when HKFA has held a complete record of the competition), there are 4 teams which have remained unbeaten throughout the whole season.

- Navy B (1945–46)

1945–46 There were 10 teams in the First Division. Navy B finished as 4th with a result of 5 wins, 4 draws and 0 losses. Navy B became the first team to go unbeaten in all league and cup matches in a season.

- South China (1977–78, 1985–86)

1977–78 There were 12 teams in the First Division. South China finished as the Champions with a magnificent result of 20 wins, 2 draws and 0 losses. South China became the first team in the League to go unbeaten in a season. The two drawn matches were against Eastern and Tung Sing.
In 1985–86 there were 2 unbeaten teams in the league. Both South China and Happy Valley topped the league with 10 wins and 8 draws. South China won the league with a goal difference of +21 five goals better than the +16 held by Happy Valley. South China became the first team to hold a record of 2 unbeaten seasons.

- Seiko (1978–79)

1978–79 In the season immediately after South China becoming the first unbeaten team, Seiko became the second team which achieved this result. With a slightly poorer result (19 wins and 3 draws) compared to the previous year's South China, Seiko still became the Champion of the season. The draw matches were against Kui Tan, Eastern and Caroline Hill. A more marvellous result for Seiko was that it won 5 out of the 6 competitions that season. The only trophy it failed to get was FA Cup, losing to Yuen Long by penalty kicks.

- Happy Valley (1985–86)

1985–86 Happy Valley was unbeaten in the season, same as South China (10 wins and 8 draws). However, Happy Valley finished runners-up because a worse goal difference. It became the first unbeaten team which could not gain the title for the season.

- Sun Hei (2002–03, 2016–17)

2002–03 Sun Hei became the fourth team to go the whole season without losing a game in the history of the league. However, they were only able to achieve a second-place finish, one point behind Happy Valley.
2016–17 Sun Hei were also the first team since the reformation of the First Division as the second tier of Hong Kong football to finish a season undefeated. They won the title in 2016–17 by one point over Wong Tai Sin.

- HKFC (2017–18)

2017–18 HKFC won their first league title in nearly a century, going unbeaten over a 30 match season.

=== Top goal scorers ===
References:

- Ho Cheung Yau (Chinese: 何祥友) (Most goals in a season)

Season: 1957–58
Number of goals: 40
Team: South China

- Dale Tempest (Most times winner for Top Goal Scorer prize)

Winning seasons: 1989–90, 1990–91, 1992–93, 1993–94, 1994–95
Total goals: 160
Played teams: Eastern, South China, Kitchee

- Yuen Kuen To (4 times Top Goal Scorer runner-up)

Runner-up seasons: 1967–68, 1968–69, 1971–72, 1972–73

=== Goalkeeper records ===
References:

- Iain Hesford (longest clean sheets)

Record: 827 min
Season: 1992–93
He assisted Eastern to maintain a record of 0 conceded and 9 straight wins in the first 9 matches of 1992–93 season. His record ended when they played the second round match against South China at the 17th minute. The goalscorer was Loh Wai Chi.

== See also ==
- The Hong Kong Football Association
- Hong Kong national football team
