= Yau Tsim Mong FT =

Yau Tsim Mong
- Full name: Mongkok District Cultural, Recreational and Sports Association Limited; Yau Tsim Mong Football Team
- Nickname: YTM
- Founded: 2003; 23 years ago
- Ground: Kowloon Tsai Park
- Chairman: Hau Wing Cheong
- Manager: Ng Tsz Wai
- League: Hong Kong Second Division
- 2025–26: Second Division, 8th of 16
Home colours	Away colours	Third colours

Yau Tsim Mong Football Team (Chinese: 油尖旺足球隊) is a football club based in Yau Tsim Mong District of Hong Kong which currently competes in the Hong Kong Second Division. The club was formed in 2003.

The team plays its home matches at Kowloon Tsai Park.

== History ==
The club was promoted to the Hong Kong Second Division, then the second tier of Hong Kong football, in the 2006–07 season after coming second in the Hong Kong Third Division "District" League and winning the playoffs. However, they were instantly relegated back to the third tier after finishing the season with only a single win and 7 points out of 20 games, and conceding 51 goals, an average of 2.5 per game.

In the 2014–15 season, the club was promoted straight from the Third Division to the First Division following the restructuring of the league, while in actuality it was promoted from the third to the second tier. The club had a strong season, winning 18 out of 28 games and finishing fourth in the league, behind eventually-promoted Southern, as both Sun Source and HKFC refused promotion, one citing financial difficulties and the other to preserve its amateur aspect.

In the 2015–16 season, the club won 13 out of 26 games and finished 5th in the league; having collected 46 points.

In the 2016–17 season, the club lost 9–0 to Eastern District on the first matchday, and went on to have a 23-game win-less streak, getting thrashed 8–0 by Metro Gallery, 8–1 against Citizen and 9–0 against Wong Tai Sin before beating Wing Yee 2–1 at Tin Yip Road Park. The club finished rock-bottom of the league and got a meager 3 wins out of 26 games, conceding 109 goals (an average of 4.2 goals per game) while only scoring 24. The club was relegated to the Second Division.

In the 2017–18 season YTM once again hovered around the relegation zone all season. However, they avoided the drop late in the season by taking 13 points from their final five matches.
