= Supreme FC =

Hong Kong football club

Sky Leader
- Full name: Sky Leader Football Club 領峰足球會
- Owner: Wong Chi Chuen
- Head coach: Lam Ka Wai
- League: Hong Kong First Division League
- 2025–26: First Division, 1st of 14
| Home colours | Away colours |

Sky Leader Football Club (Chinese: 領峰足球會) is a Hong Kong football club which currently competes in the Hong Kong First Division.

== History ==
The club earned the right to be promoted to the Hong Kong Premier League after winning the 2014–15 Hong Kong First Division League with two games to spare. However, the club eventually declined promotion, citing financial difficulties.

The following season, Sun Source was relegated to the Second Division after finishing 13th in the First Division. From 2016 to 2018, the club was branded as HKU CXSC Sun Source.

In the 2018–19 season, Sun Source was rebranded as Qiyi Hanstti. However, the club was relegated again to the Third Division after finishing 13th in the Second Division.

In the 2019–20 season, Sun Source was rebranded again as Lansbury, and was coached by former Kawasaki Frontale and Eastern player Yusuke Igawa.

In the 2023–24 season, Sun Source was rebranded again as Supreme FC.

In the 2025–26 season, Supreme FC finished top of the Hong Kong First Division League with 23 wins out of 26 games. They were renamed as Sky Leader FC in 2026–27 season.

== Honours ==
=== League ===
- Hong Kong First Division
  - Champions (2): 2014–15, 2025–26
- Hong Kong Third Division
  - Champions (2): 2013–14, 2023–24
- Hong Kong Third A Division League
  - Champions (1): 2005–06

=== Cup Competitions ===
- Hong Kong FA Cup Junior Division
  - Champions (1): 2013–14
