= Kwun Tong FA =

Kwun Tong
- Full name: Kwun Tong Football Association
- Founded: 2003; 23 years ago
- Ground: Kowloon Bay Park
- Chairman: Chan Chen Pan
- Manager: Lai Pak Yung
- League: Hong Kong Second Division
- 2025–26: First Division, 14th of 14 (relegated)
- Website: https://www.facebook.com/KTFA2002/
Home colours	Away colours

Kwun Tong Football Association (Chinese: 觀塘區足球會) is a Hong Kong football club which currently competes in the Hong Kong Second Division, after finishing 14th and was relegated from the Hong Kong First Division in the 2025–26 season.

The club plays the majority of its home matches at Kowloon Bay Park.

== Honours ==
=== Cup ===
- Hong Kong Second Division League Cup

Champions (1): 2022
