= Lucky Mile =

- Full name: Lucky Mile Limited
- Founded: 1990s
- Ground: Hong Kong Football Club Stadium
- Capacity: 2,750
- Manager: Yang Zhang George
- Coach: Manuel Bleda
- League: Hong Kong First Division
- 2025–26: First Division, 13th of 14
Home colours	Away colours

Lucky Mile (Chinese: 浩運) is the second team of HKFC which currently compete in the Hong Kong First Division League.

== Club history ==
Lucky Mile was formed in the late 1990s, borrowing on HKFC's membership in the Hong Kong Football Association.

In the 1999–2000 season, the club won the Hong Kong Third Division championship and for the first time rose to the Hong Kong Second Division.

In the 2007–2008 season, the club finished ninth and along with tenth place New Fair Kui Tan, they were relegated to Hong Kong Group C (A) Football League.

In the 2008–2009 season, with a record of 15 wins and 3 losses have 46 points, they won the championship and achieved Group C Finals qualification. At the Group C finals, they tied Sai Kung Friends with a record 3–1–1 record and 4 points for top spot in the Group. However, due to goal difference, Lucky Mile finished runners up in the Group, narrowly missing out promotion back to the Second Division.

In the 2009–10 season, Lucky Mile won the first three in Group C, because the Serie B Supplementary team were allowed to rise on Group B for the tournament and gained promotion.

In the 2010–11 season, Lucky Mile won 3 games all year and finished 12th. They dropped back to Hong Kong in Third Division Group C (A).

In the 2012–13 season, Lucky Mile finished with a record of 18–5–3 gaining automatic promotion back to the Second Division.

Following a last place finish in 2015–16, Lucky Mile were demoted from the Hong Kong First Division back down to the Second Division.

In the 2016–17 season, Lucky Mile finished fourth in the Second Division, and therefore stayed in the same division. They were knocked out of the Hong Kong FA Cup Junior Division by Central & Western District, losing 5–1.

== Club officials ==
=== Coaching staff ===
Position	Staff
General Manager/Team Rep	(Hong Kong) Yang Zhang George
Head coach	(Hong Kong) Manuel Bleda
Technical Director	(Hong Kong) Ko Chun
Team Manager	(Singapore) Leung King Yu

== Honours ==
=== League ===
- Hong Kong Third Division
  - Champions (1): 1999–00
- Hong Kong Third A Division League
  - Champions (1): 2008–09

== See also ==
- HKFC
