= Wing Yee FT =

Association football club in Hong Kong

Wing Yee
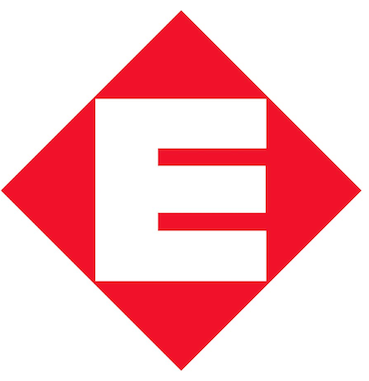
- Full name: Wing Yee Football Team
- Founded: 2006; 20 years ago
- Chairman: Koon Wing Yee
- League: Hong Kong Second Division
- 2025–26: Second Division, 7th of 16
- Website: https://www.facebook.com/WingYeeFCHK
Home colours	Away colours	Third colours

Wing Yee Football Team (Chinese: 永義足球隊), currently known as Wing Yee Property for sponsorship reasons, is a football club based in Hong Kong, that competes in the Hong Kong Second Division League.

== History ==
Wing Yee joined the Hong Kong Third Division "A" League in 2006–07 season by borrowing the league membership of HK City Athletics Promotion Centre Ltd. The team was promoted to Hong Kong Second Division after the 2007–08 Hong Kong Third Division "A" League season.

In the 2008–09 and 2009–10 seasons, the team finished at 4th and 5th respectively in the Second Division.
