= 2023–24 in Hong Kong football =

Football events in Hong Kong

Football in Hong Kong
- Season: 2023–24

Men's football
- Premier League: Lee Man
- First Division League: Kowloon City
- Second Division League: WSE
- Third Division League: Supreme FC
- FA Cup: Eastern
- Senior Shield: Kitchee
- Sapling Cup: Rangers

This article summarises Hong Kong football in the 2023–24 season.

== National teams ==
Source: HKFA

=== Men's ===
==== Senior ====
14 November Friendly	Hong Kong	3–1	Philippines	So Kon Po, Hong Kong
20:00 UTC+8	Orr 44', 90+6'; Everton 83'	Report	Kristensen 48'	Stadium: Hong Kong Stadium; Attendance: 4,966; Referee: Warintorn Sassadee (Thailand)

19 November Friendly	Hong Kong	1–0	Mauritius	Mong Kok, Hong Kong
20:00 UTC+8	Everton 11'	Report		Stadium: Mong Kok Stadium; Attendance: 4,937; Referee: Torphong Somsing (Thailand)

8 December 2025 EAFF E-1 Preliminary	Mongolia	0–3	Hong Kong	Mong Kok, Hong Kong
18:00 UTC+8		Report	Everton 24'; Wong Wai 35'; Benavides 60'	Stadium: Mong Kok Stadium; Attendance: 3,329; Referee: Wiwat Jumpaoon (Thailand)

14 December 2025 EAFF E-1 Preliminary	Hong Kong	2–1	Chinese Taipei	Mong Kok, Hong Kong
20:00 UTC+8	Orr 19'; Tsui Wang Kit 87'	Report	Yu Yao-hsing 29'	Stadium: Mong Kok Stadium; Attendance: 5,637; Referee: Chae Sang-hyeop (South Korea)

17 December 2025 EAFF E-1 Preliminary	Guam	0–5	Hong Kong	So Kon Po, Hong Kong
20:00 UTC+8		Report	Chan Siu Kwan 2', 53'; Benavides 12'; Everton 50'; Dudu 78'	Stadium: Hong Kong Stadium; Attendance: 8,236; Referee: Wiwat Jumpaoon (Thailand)

==== U-20 ====
25 September 2025 AFC U-20 ACQ	Jordan	7–0	Hong Kong	Doha, Qatar
20:00 UTC+3	Al-Fakhouri 37'; Khrouba 42'; Al-Khdour 47'; Sabra 51'; Khader 60'; Taha 80'; Al-Khob 90'			Stadium: Grand Hamad Stadium; Attendance: 110; Referee: Baraa Aisha (Palestine)

27 September 2025 AFC U-20 ACQ	Hong Kong	0–2	Qatar	Doha, Qatar
20:00 UTC+3			Gouda 47'; Al-Hassan 61'	Stadium: Abdullah bin Khalifa Stadium; Attendance: 600; Referee: Wiwat Jumpaoon (Thailand)

29 September 2025 AFC U-20 ACQ	Singapore	0–2	Hong Kong	Doha, Qatar
20:00 UTC+3			Pinto 26'; Ho Tung Lam 48'	Stadium: Grand Hamad Stadium; Referee: Wiwat Jumpaoon (Thailand)

==== U-17 ====
23 April 2024 Costa Cálida Super Cup	Spain U-15	1–0	Hong Kong	San Pedro del Pinatar, Spain
18:00 UTC+2	Jairo Morilla 60'			Stadium: Pinatar Arena

27 April 2024 Costa Cálida Super Cup	Hong Kong	1–3	Scotland U-15	San Pedro del Pinatar, Spain
15:00 UTC+2				Stadium: Pinatar Arena

11 August 2024 Friendly	Hong Kong	0–1	(England) Man Utd U-16	Mong Kok, Hong Kong
18:00 UTC+8				Stadium: Mong Kok Stadium

19 October 2024 2025 AFC U-17 ACQ	North Korea	8–2	Hong Kong	Zarqa, Jordan
21:00 UTC+3	Pak Kwang-song 3'; Kim Yu-jin 8', 71'; Ri Ro-gwon 13'; Ri Kang-rim 14', 38', 58'; Ri Tae-myong 66'	Report	Yiu Tsz Leong 19'; Cheung Yiu Hin 90+5'	Stadium: Prince Mohammed Stadium

21 October 2024 2025 AFC U-17 ACQ	Hong Kong	1–7	Iran	Zarqa, Jordan
17:00 UTC+3	Yiu Tsz Leong 23'	Report	Garachchomaghloo 2', 50', 88', 90+2'; Khodadadian 16', 84'; Ahmadimanesh 32'	Stadium: Prince Mohammed Stadium

23 October 2024 2025 AFC U-17 ACQ	Jordan	1–2	Hong Kong	Zarqa, Jordan
17:00 UTC+3	Al-Qasem 34' (pen.)	Report	Cheung Yiu Hin 5'; Wong Yat Hin 17'	Stadium: Prince Mohammed Stadium; Referee: Athambawa Mohamed Jafran (Sri Lanka)

27 October 2024 2025 AFC U-17 ACQ	Hong Kong	2–1	Syria	Zarqa, Jordan
21:00 UTC+3	Hui Siu Chung 65'; Chin Yu Ho Jeffery 88'		Abdulrahman Dinawi 64'	Stadium: Prince Mohammed Stadium; Referee: Umesh Bidari (Nepal)

=== Women's ===
21 February 2024 Turkish Women's Cup	Hong Kong	0–1	Kosovo	Alanya, Turkey
16:30		Report	Ejupi 78'	Stadium: Gold City Sport Complex; Referee: Gamze Durmuş (Turkey)

24 February 2024 Turkish Women's Cup	India	2–0	Hong Kong	Alanya, Turkey
16:30				Stadium: Gold City Sport Complex

27 February 2024 Turkish Women's Cup	Estonia	1–0	Hong Kong	Alanya, Turkey
15:30	Kala 72'	Report		Stadium: Gold City Sport Complex; Referee: Melis Özçiğdem (Turkey)

11 July Friendly	Hong Kong	3–2	Indonesia	Happy Valley, Hong Kong
18:00 UTC+8	Chung Pui Ki 19'; Chan Wing Sze 54'; Cheung Wai Ki 69'	Report (FIFA)	Citra R. 24'; Marsela A. 80'	Stadium: Hong Kong Football Club Stadium; Attendance: 0

14 July Friendly	Hong Kong	4–1	Indonesia	Happy Valley, Hong Kong
18:00 UTC+8	Wai Yuen Ting 5'; Ho Mui Mei 25'; Cheung Wai Ki 28', 45+3'		Furyzcha 63'	Stadium: Hong Kong Football Club Stadium; Attendance: 1,589; Referee: Supiree Testhomya (Thailand)

23 October Friendly	Myanmar	4–1	Hong Kong	Yangon, Myanmar
				Stadium: Thuwanna Stadium

27 October Friendly	Myanmar	4–1	Hong Kong	Yangon, Myanmar
				Stadium: Thuwanna Stadium

== Club competitions ==
=== League (men) ===
==== Promotion and relegation ====
League	Promoted to league	Relegated from league
Hong Kong Premier League	Kowloon City	Sham Shui Po; Resources Capital
Hong Kong First Division League	WSE; Tuen Mun	Sai Kung; Wong Tai Sin
Hong Kong Second Division League	Supreme FC; Tsuen Wan	Kowloon Cricket Club; Wanchai
Hong Kong Third Division League		Ornament

==== Hong Kong Premier League ====
Pos	Team	Pld	W	D	L	GF	GA	GD	Pts	Qualification or relegation
1	Lee Man (C)	20	17	3	0	63	16	+47	54	Qualification for AFC Champions League Two group stage
2	Tai Po	20	14	4	2	41	12	+29	46 (Note: Tai Po are ahead of Eastern on head-to-head points: Tai Po 6, Eastern 0)	
3	Eastern	20	14	4	2	47	11	+36	46	Qualification for AFC Champions League Two group stage (Note: Eastern qualified for the AFC Champions League Two group stage as the 2023–24 Hong Kong FA Cup winners)
4	Kitchee	20	14	3	3	60	15	+45	45	
5	Southern	20	10	4	6	38	18	+20	34	
6	Rangers	20	8	0	12	41	34	+7	24	
7	HKFC	20	5	3	12	16	49	−33	18 (Note: HKFC are ahead of North District on head-to-head points: HKFC 4, North District 1)	
8	North District	20	5	3	12	27	43	−16	18	
9	Sham Shui Po (R)	20	3	3	14	18	52	−34	12	Relegation to First Division (Note: Sham Shui Po announced on 22 June 2024 that they would self-relegate)
10	HK U23 (W)	20	2	3	15	12	71	−59	9	Withdrew from league system (Note: HK U23 announced on 25 May 2024 that they would be dissolved after the end of the season)
11	Resources Capital (R)	20	1	4	15	13	55	−42	7	Relegation to First Division (Note: Resources Capital announced on 21 June 2024 that they would self-relegate)

Updated to match(es) played on unknown. Source: Hong Kong Football Association
Rules for classification: 1) Points; 2) Head-to-head points; 3) Head-to-head goal difference; 4) Head-to-head goals scored; 5) Goal difference; 6) Goals scored; 7) Fair-play points; 8) Drawing lots (Play-off if the winner has to be decided).
(C) Champions; (R) Relegated; (W) Withdrew

==== Hong Kong First Division League ====
Pos	Team	Pld	W	D	L	GF	GA	GD	Pts	Promotion or relegation
1	Kowloon City (C, P)	22	18	2	2	57	21	+36	56	Promotion to the Premier League
2	Central & Western	22	15	5	2	71	32	+39	50	
3	South China	22	10	6	6	53	26	+27	36	
4	Sha Tin	22	10	4	8	51	41	+10	34	
5	3 Sing	22	9	6	7	42	31	+11	33	
6	Yuen Long	22	8	7	7	43	39	+4	31	
7	Citizen	22	9	3	10	35	38	−3	30	
8	Wing Yee	22	6	4	12	26	49	−23	22	
9	Eastern District	22	5	5	12	42	53	−11	20 (Note: Eastern District are ahead of Hoi King on head-to-head points: Eastern District 4, Hoi King 1)	
10	Hoi King	22	5	5	12	28	54	−26	20	
11	Sai Kung (R)	22	5	4	13	24	57	−33	19	Relegation to the Second Division
12	Wong Tai Sin (R)	22	5	3	14	29	60	−31	18	Relegation to the Second Division

Updated to match(es) played on 26 May 2024. Source: Hong Kong Football Association
Rules for classification: 1) Points; 2) Head-to-head points; 3) Head-to-head goal difference; 4) Head-to-head goals scored; 5) Goal difference; 6) Goals scored; 7) Fair-play points; 8) Drawing lots
(C) Champions; (P) Promoted; (R) Relegated

==== Hong Kong Second Division League ====
Pos	Team	Pld	W	D	L	GF	GA	GD	Pts	Promotion or relegation
1	Wofoo Social Enterprises (C, P)	30	19	10	1	69	18	+51	67	Promotion to the First Division
2	Tuen Mun (P)	30	19	6	5	61	35	+26	63	Promotion to the First Division
3	Leaper	30	16	9	5	60	26	+34	57	
4	Yau Tsim Mong	30	16	4	10	70	40	+30	52	
5	Lucky Mile	30	13	9	8	52	37	+15	48	
6	Kwun Tong	30	11	13	6	49	38	+11	46	
7	Wing Go	30	11	8	11	44	41	+3	41	
8	Kwai Tsing	30	10	6	14	41	59	−18	36	
9	Kwong Wah	30	8	10	12	42	48	−6	34 (Note: Kwong Wah win head-to-head against Chelsea Soccer School)	
10	CFCSSHK (W)	30	9	7	14	42	56	−14	34	Withdrew from league system
11	Tung Sing	30	9	6	15	33	46	−13	33	
12	Fu Moon	30	8	8	14	49	67	−18	32	
13	Sun Hei	30	8	7	15	31	47	−16	31 (Note: Sun Hei win head-to-head against Mutual)	
14	Mutual	30	9	4	17	35	67	−32	31	
15	Kowloon Cricket Club (R)	30	8	6	16	34	61	−27	30	Relegation to the Third Division
16	Wan Chai (R)	30	5	9	16	28	54	−26	24	Relegation to the Third Division

Updated to match(es) played on 16 June 2024. Source: Hong Kong Football Association
Rules for classification: 1) Points; 2) Head-to-head points; 3) Head-to-head goal difference; 4) Head-to-head goals scored; 5) Goal difference; 6) Goals scored; 7) Fair-play points; 8) Drawing lots
(C) Champions; (P) Promoted; (R) Relegated; (W) Withdrew

==== Hong Kong Third Division League ====
Pos	Team	Pld	W	D	L	GF	GA	GD	Pts	Promotion or relegation
1	Supreme FC (C, P)	28	19	6	3	72	20	+52	63	Promotion to Second Division
2	Tsuen Wan (P)	28	19	4	5	48	21	+27	61	Promotion to Second Division
3	Double Flower	28	17	4	7	60	24	+36	55	
4	Tsun Tat	28	15	6	7	68	49	+19	51	
5	St. Joseph's	28	13	5	10	69	69	0	44	
6	Gospel	28	11	8	9	45	31	+14	41	
7	KCDRSC	28	8	11	9	30	37	−7	35	
8	Kui Tan	28	9	4	15	56	62	−6	31 (Note: Kui Tan win head-to-head against Sui Tung)	
9	Sui Tung	28	8	7	13	43	64	−21	31	
10	Konter	28	8	6	14	34	58	−24	30 (Note: Konter win head-to-head against Islands and Fukien)	
11	Islands	28	6	12	10	28	35	−7	30	
12	Fukien	28	7	9	12	28	37	−9	30	
13	Ravia Orion	28	6	10	12	36	51	−15	28	
14	Tuen Mun FC	28	7	5	16	24	58	−34	26	
15	Ornament (E)	28	7	3	18	33	58	−25	24	Elimination from League System

Updated to match(es) played on 16 June 2024. Source: Hong Kong Football Association
(C) Champions; (E) Eliminated; (P) Promoted

=== First round ===
30 September 2023 SS01	Southern	5–1	HK U23	Aberdeen Sports Ground
15:00	Sasaki 61'; Ju Yingzhi 65'; Pereira 71'; Awal 90', 90+4'	Report	Lee Lok Him 18'	Attendance: 231; Referee: Poon Chun Kit

1 October 2023 SS02	Tai Po	1–1 (4–3 p)	North District	Tai Po Sports Ground
15:00	Chan Hiu Fung 44'	Report	Kendy 11' (pen.)	Attendance: 765; Referee: Tam Ping Wun
	Penalties
	Marcão (penalty scored); Renner (penalty missed); Chung Wai Keung (penalty scored); Luizinho (penalty scored); Cividini (penalty scored)		(penalty scored) Neném; (penalty scored) Pedrão; (penalty missed) Law Hiu Chung; (penalty scored) Matheus; (penalty missed) Wong Wai Kwok

1 October 2023 SS03	Sham Shui Po	1–0	HKFC	Sham Shui Po Sports Ground
15:00	Wongpila 39'			Attendance: 176; Referee: Ho Wai Sing

=== Quarter-finals ===
1 November 2023 SS04	Rangers	4–3 (a.e.t.)	Sham Shui Po	Mong Kok Stadium
20:00	Ma Sang-hoon 23', 30'; Lau Chi Lok 33'; Yiu Ho Ming 104'	Report	N. Benavides 45+1'; Lam Ka Wai 53' (o.g.); Marković 63'	Attendance: 362; Referee: Woo Chun Sing

3 November 2023 SS05	Lee Man	2–1	Tai Po	Mong Kok Stadium
20:00	Everton 65'; Wong Wai 80'	Report	Luizinho 24'	Attendance: 1,129; Referee: Tam Ping Wun

4 November 2023 SS06	Kitchee	7–0	Resources Capital	Tai Po Sports Ground
15:00	Mingazov 1'; Jantscher 5'; Poon Pui Hin 8'; Hui Chak Wai 23' (o.g.); Russell 44'; Kim Shin-wook 55', 87'	Report		Attendance: 387; Referee: Poon Chun Kit

5 November 2023 SS07	Eastern	3–2 (a.e.t.)	Southern	Tai Po Sports Ground
15:00	Almazan 9'; Gondra 38'; Baffoe 94'	Report	Pereira 32'; Odu 73'	Attendance: 529; Referee: Wong Wai Lun

=== Semi-finals ===
11 November 2023 SS08	Eastern	3–0	Rangers	Mong Kok Stadium
18:00	Baffoe 18'; Wong Ho Chun 22'; Kozubayev 89'	Report		Attendance: 1,156; Referee: Lau Fong Hei

12 November 2023 SS09	Kitchee	1–0	Lee Man	Mong Kok Stadium
15:00	Juninho 18'	Report		Attendance: 2,360; Referee: Liu Kwok Man

=== Final ===
11 February 2024 SS10	Kitchee	2–1 (a.e.t.)	Eastern	Mong Kok Stadium
15:00	Scott 90+6' (pen.); Mingazow 118'	Report	Leung Kwun Chung 85' (pen.)	Attendance: 4,570; Referee: Tam Ping Wun

==== Hong Kong FA Cup ====
Times are in Hong Kong Time (UTC+08:00).

=== First round ===
14 October 2023	Sham Shui Po	1–0	HK U23	Mong Kok
15:00	Leung Sing Yiu 69'	Report		Stadium: Mong Kok Stadium; Attendance: 230; Referee: Luk Kin Sun

21 October 2023	North District	1–4	Lee Man	Tsing Yi
15:00	Kendy 69' (pen.)	Report	Paulissen 51'; Wong Wai 62'; Acosta 84'; Paulinho 90+6'	Stadium: Tsing Yi Sports Ground; Attendance: 294; Referee: Tam Ping Wun

25 November 2023	Tai Po	0–1	Resources Capital	Mong Kok
15:00		Report	Lee Ching 3'	Stadium: Mong Kok Stadium; Attendance: 393; Referee: Ho Wai Sing

=== Quarter-finals ===
2 December 2023	Rangers	3–4	Lee Man	Mong Kok
15:00	Kanda 34' (pen.); Ibrahim 69', 82'	Report	Paulinho 18' (pen.), 21'; Gil 27'; Park Jong-bum 55' (o.g.)	Stadium: Mong Kok Stadium; Attendance: 1,010; Referee: Tam Ping Wun

9 December 2023	Southern	1–1 (a.e.t.) (4–5 p)	Sham Shui Po	Tai Po
15:00	Goiano 41'	Report	Song Ju-ho 90+3'	Stadium: Tai Po Sports Ground; Attendance: 202; Referee: Ho Wai Sing
	Penalties
	Pereira (penalty scored); Kessi (penalty scored); Goiano (penalty scored); Awal (penalty missed); Sasaki (penalty scored)		V. Marković (penalty scored); I. Marković (penalty scored); Ngan Cheuk Pan (penalty scored); Dunga (penalty scored); N. Benavides (penalty scored)

16 December 2023	Eastern	1–0	Resources Capital	Mong Kok
15:00	Ma Hei Wai 2'	Report		Stadium: Mong Kok Stadium; Attendance: 554; Referee: Lau Fong Hei

9 March 2024	Kitchee	2–0	HKFC	Mong Kok
15:00	Roberto 5'; Temirov 82'	Report		Stadium: Mong Kok Stadium; Attendance: 463; Referee: Poon Chun Kit

=== Semi-finals ===
11 May 2024	Lee Man	1–2	Sham Shui Po	Aberdeen
15:00	Wong Wai 29'	Report	N. Benavides 53'; Dunga 73'	Stadium: Aberdeen Sports Ground; Attendance: 450; Referee: Wong Wai Lung

12 May 2024	Kitchee	1–2	Eastern	Mong Kok
16:30	Mikael 76'	Report	Baffoe 18', 78'	Stadium: Mong Kok Stadium; Attendance: 1,395; Referee: Tam Ping Wun

=== Final ===
1 June 2024	Eastern	3–2 (a.e.t.)	Sham Shui Po	Mong Kok
15:30 UTC+8	Kozubayev 100'; Baffoe 102', 115'	Report	N. Benavides 103'; Dunga 105+5'	Stadium: Mong Kok Stadium; Attendance: 3,437; Referee: Yu Kin Fung

==== Hong Kong Sapling Cup ====
Pos	Team	Pld	W	D	L	GF	GA	GD	Pts	Qualification
1	Southern	10	6	4	0	25	10	+15	22	Advance to Semi-finals
2	Tai Po	10	6	1	3	19	13	+6	19	Advance to Semi-finals
3	Eastern	10	4	5	1	25	14	+11	17	
4	HKFC	10	3	3	4	19	23	−4	12	
5	Sham Shui Po	10	2	1	7	15	33	−18	7	
6	HK U23	10	1	2	7	11	21	−10	5	

Updated to match(es) played on 23 March 2024. Source: HKFA
Rules for classification: 1) Points; 2) Head-to-head points; 3) Head-to-head goal difference; 4) Goal difference; 5) Goals scored.

Pos	Team	Pld	W	D	L	GF	GA	GD	Pts	Qualification
1	Kitchee	8	5	1	2	26	14	+12	16	Advance to Semi-finals
2	Rangers	8	4	3	1	22	18	+4	15	Advance to Semi-finals
3	North District	8	4	2	2	15	12	+3	14	
4	Resources Capital	8	1	2	5	10	24	−14	5 (Note: Head-to-head points: Resources Capital 4, Lee Man 1.)	
5	Lee Man	8	1	2	5	12	17	−5	5	

Updated to match(es) played on 24 March 2024. Source: HKFA
Rules for classification: 1) Points; 2) Head-to-head points; 3) Head-to-head goal difference; 4) Goal difference; 5) Goals scored.

===== Semi-finals =====
3 April 2024 SP51	Kitchee	4–3	Tai Po	Mong Kok Stadium
20:00	Cheng Chin Lung 33'; Mikael 45+2' (pen.); Juninho 61'; Tan Chun Lok 90+8'	Report	Lucas 6', 84'; Renner 45+7'	Attendance: 1,153; Referee: Wong Wai Lun

10 April 2024 SP52	Southern	0–2	Rangers	Mong Kok Stadium
20:00		Report	Kamigata 42'; Chan Yiu Cho 90+7'	Attendance: 1,006; Referee: Luk Kin Sun

===== Final =====
15 May 2024 SP53	Rangers	1–0	Kitchee	Mong Kok Stadium
15:00	Ibrahim 40'	Report		Attendance: 3,769; Referee: Liu Kwok Man

==== HKPLC Cup ====
===== Semi-finals =====
28 December 2023	Lee Man	3–2	Rangers	Mong Kok
20:00 UTC+8	Anier 5'; Gil 33', 49'	Report	Lau Chi Lok 73'; Umeofia 90+4'	Stadium: Mong Kok Stadium; Attendance: 1,256; Referee: Lau Fong Hei

29 December 2023	Kitchee	5–0	Eastern	Mong Kok
20:00 UTC+8	Russell 3'; Scott 15'; Mingazow 28'; Temirov 78', 84'	Report		Stadium: Mong Kok Stadium; Attendance: 1,181; Referee: Poon Chun Kit

===== Final =====
1 January 2024	Lee Man	2–2 (4–5 p)	Kitchee	Mong Kok
17:30 UTC+8	Anier 2'; Gil 7'	Report	Mikael 9'; Mingazow 14'	Stadium: Mong Kok Stadium; Attendance: 2,978; Referee: Liu Kwok Man
	Penalties
	Anier (penalty missed); Paulissen (penalty scored); Dudu (penalty scored); Diego (penalty scored); Tachibana (penalty scored)		(penalty scored) Mikael; (penalty scored) Sartori; (penalty scored) Fernando; (penalty scored) Cleiton; (penalty scored) Roberto

== Other ==
=== Tatler XFest ===
February 4 Friendly	Hong Kong League XI	1–4	(United States) Inter Miami	Hong Kong
3:00 a.m. EST	Anier 43'	Report	Taylor 40'; Sunderland 50'; Campana 56'; Sailor 85'	Stadium: Hong Kong Stadium; Attendance: 38,417; Referee: Tam Ping Wun (Hong Kong)

== See also ==
- Hong Kong Football Association
- Hong Kong national football team
- Hong Kong women's national football team
- Hong Kong national under-23 football team
- Hong Kong national under-20 football team
- Hong Kong national under-17 football team
