= 2024–25 in Hong Kong football =

Football events in Hong Kong

Football in Hong Kong
- Season: 2024–25

Men's football
- Premier League: Tai Po
- First Division League: Citizen
- Second Division League: Tung Sing
- Third Division League: Kui Tan
- FA Cup: Eastern
- Senior Shield: Eastern
- Sapling Cup: Southern

This article summarises Hong Kong football in the 2024–25 season.

== National teams ==
Source: HKFA

=== Men's ===
==== Senior ====
4 September 2025 King's Cup	Iraq	2–1	Hong Kong	Kanchanaburi, Thailand
16:00 UTC+7	Ali 67', 80'	Report	Orr 61' (pen.)	Stadium: Kanchanaburi Province Stadium; Referee: Mongkolchai Pechsri (Thailand)

7 September 2025 King's Cup	Fiji	0–8	Hong Kong	Kanchanaburi, Thailand
16:00 UTC+7		Report	Yu Joy Yin 18', 42'; Juninho 27', 45'; Merkies 40'; Ayman 50' (o.g.); Everton 74'; Chan Siu Kwan 77'	Stadium: Kanchanaburi Province Stadium; Attendance: 3,275; Referee: Torphong Somsing (Thailand)

9 October 2027 ACQ R3	Bangladesh	3–4	Hong Kong	Dhaka, Bangladesh
20:00 UTC+6	Choudhury 13'; Morsalin 84'; Shome 90+9'	Report; Report (AFC)	Camargo 45+4'; Merkies 50', 75', 90+11'	Stadium: National Stadium; Attendance: 22,343; Referee: Saud Al Samhan (Kuwait)

14 October 2027 ACQ R3	Hong Kong	1–1	Bangladesh	Kai Tak, Hong Kong
20:00 UTC+8	Orr 36' (pen.)	Report; Report (AFC)	Rakib 84'	Stadium: Kai Tak Stadium; Attendance: 45,489; Referee: Hiroki Kasahara (Japan)

13 November Friendly	Hong Kong	1–1	Cambodia	So Kon Po, Hong Kong
20:00 UTC+8	Wong Wai 31'	Report	Krya 33'	Stadium: Hong Kong Stadium; Attendance: 7,480; Referee: Lê Vũ Linh (Vietnam)

18 November 2027 ACQ R3	Hong Kong	1–2	Singapore	Kai Tak, Hong Kong
20:00 UTC+8	Orr 15'	Report	Anuar 64'; Fandi 67'	Stadium: Kai Tak Stadium; Attendance: 47,762; Referee: Sivakorn Pu-udom (Thailand)

==== U-23 ====
3 September 2026 AFC U-23 ACQ	Iran	4–0	Hong Kong	Abu Dhabi, United Arab Emirates
17:30 UTC+4	Jafari 70'; Razzaghinia 73'; Taheri 86', 90+2'	Report		Stadium: Al Nahyan Stadium; Attendance: 145; Referee: Kim Yu-jeong (South Korea)

6 September 2026 AFC U-23 ACQ	Hong Kong	0–2	United Arab Emirates	Abu Dhabi, United Arab Emirates
21:30 UTC+4		Report	Ndiaye 58'; Al-Memari 81'	Stadium: Al Nahyan Stadium; Attendance: 254; Referee: Hussein Abo Yehia (Lebanon)

9 September 2026 AFC U-23 ACQ	Hong Kong	1–0	Guam	Abu Dhabi, United Arab Emirates
17:30 UTC+4	Lee Lok Him 2'			Stadium: Al Nahyan Stadium; Attendance: 40; Referee: Kim Yu-jeong (South Korea)

==== U-20 ====
6 June Friendly	Hong Kong	1–1 (4–5 p)	(China) Hubei U-18	Kowloon, Hong Kong
19:00 UTC+8				Stadium: Kai Tak Youth Sports Ground

8 June Friendly	Hong Kong	2–2 (6–4 p)	(Spain) Málaga CF U-20	Kowloon, Hong Kong
12:00 UTC+8				Stadium: Kai Tak Youth Sports Ground

==== U-16 ====
9 July Lion City Cup 2025	Hong Kong	2–0	Cambodia	Kallang, Singapore
17:00 UTC+8				Stadium: Jalan Besar Stadium

11 July Asia International Youth Soccer	Hong Kong	1–1 (2–4 p)	(Japan) Tottori Select U-16	Tottori, Japan
16:30 UTC+9				Stadium: DoraDoraPark Football Stadium

11 July Lion City Cup 2025	Philippines	1–1	Hong Kong	Kallang, Singapore
17:00 UTC+8				Stadium: Jalan Besar Stadium

12 July Asia International Youth Soccer	Hong Kong	5–1	Chinese Taipei	Tottori, Japan
16:30 UTC+9				Stadium: DoraDoraPark Athletic Stadium

13 July Asia International Youth Soccer	Hong Kong	2–0	(Japan) Gainare Tottori U-16	Tottori, Japan
17:30 UTC+9				Stadium: All Gainare Yajin Stadium

13 July Lion City Cup 2025	Singapore	4–1	Hong Kong	Kallang, Singapore
20:00 UTC+8				Stadium: Jalan Besar Stadium

17 August Friendly	Hong Kong	1–7	(England) Man Utd U-16	Mong Kok, Hong Kong
18:00 UTC+8				Stadium: Mong Kok Stadium

14 November Friendly	Cambodia	v	Hong Kong	Cambodia
--:-- UTC+7

17 November Friendly	Thailand	v	Hong Kong	Thailand
--:-- UTC+7

22 November 2026 AFC U-17 ACQ	Hong Kong	2–0	Macau	Hanoi, Vietnam
16:00 UTC+7	Tung 19'; Sean Wong 58'	Report		Stadium: Vietnam YFTC Field No. 3 Referee: Ismaeel Fazal (Pakistan)

24 November 2026 AFC U-17 ACQ	Malaysia	1–0	Hong Kong	Hanoi, Vietnam
16:00 UTC+7	Iman Danish 65'	Report		Stadium: Vietnam YFTC Field No. 3 Referee: Mohammed Saleh Alghamdi (Saudi Arabia)

26 November 2026 AFC U-17 ACQ	Vietnam	2–0	Hong Kong	Hưng Yên, Vietnam
19:00 UTC+7	Nguyễn Minh Thuỷ 11'; Nguyễn Mạnh Cường 72'	Report		Stadium: PVF Stadium; Referee: Cllifford Daypuyat (Philippines)

28 November 2026 AFC U-17 ACQ	Hong Kong	4–0	Northern Mariana Islands	Hanoi, Vietnam
19:00 UTC+7	Sephrey Ma 5'; Leung 53'; Eden Tung 71'; Lam 88'	Report		Stadium: Vietnam YFTC Field No. 3 Referee: Daniel Cook (Australia)

30 November 2026 AFC U-17 ACQ	Singapore	1–1	Hong Kong	Hanoi, Vietnam
19:00 UTC+7	Zharfan 72'	Report	Nigel Lau 7'	Stadium: Vietnam YFTC Field No. 3 Referee: Rustam Choriev (Uzbekistan)

==== U-15 ====
18 December 2025 EAFF U-15	Hong Kong	2–0	South Korea	Zhangzhou, China
10:10 UTC+8		Report		Stadium: Hooray International Football Training Base A-05 Pitch

20 December 2025 EAFF U-15	Hong Kong	0–2	Japan	Zhangzhou, China
10:10 UTC+8		Report	Yu Nanakubo 39'; Ren Isobe 70+1'	Stadium: Hooray International Football Training Base Pitch 5 Referee: Shi Liangyi (China)

22 December 2025 EAFF U-15	China	v	Hong Kong	Zhangzhou, China
15:00 UTC+8		Report		Stadium: Hooray International Football Training Base Stadium

==== Futsal ====
20 September 2026 AFC ACQ	Vietnam	9–1	Hong Kong	Hangzhou, China
--:-- UTC+8

22 September 2026 AFC ACQ	Hong Kong	1–1	Lebanon	Hangzhou, China
--:-- UTC+8

24 September 2026 AFC ACQ	China	4–0	Hong Kong	Hangzhou, China
--:-- UTC+8

=== Women's ===
==== Senior ====
22 October Closed Door Friendly	Hong Kong	3–2	Malaysia	Tseung Kwan O, Hong Kong
16:00 UTC+8	Cheung W.K. 42'; Po Y.C. 60', 68'	Report	Fazira 11'; Najwa 30'	Stadium: Jockey Club HKFA Football Training Centre

25 October Friendly	Hong Kong	5–0	Malaysia	Kowloon, Hong Kong
18:00 UTC+8	Leung H.K. 2' (pen.), 33', 47'; Chan Y.H. 59'; Kwan W.Y. 85'	Report		Stadium: Kai Tak Youth Sports Ground

29 November Friendly	Liechtenstein	1–4	Hong Kong	Eschen, Liechtenstein
14:00	Hürlimann 90+3'	Report	Leung H.K. 45', 54', 83' (pen.); Wong T.K. 90+1'	Stadium: Sportpark Eschen-Mauren; Attendance: 170; Referee: Déborah Anex (Switzerland)

==== U-20 ====
22 October Closed Door Friendly	Hong Kong	3–2	Malaysia	Tseung Kwan O, Hong Kong
16:00 UTC+8	Cheung W.K. 42'; Po Y.C. 60', 68'	Report	Fazira 11'; Najwa 30'	Stadium: Jockey Club HKFA Football Training Centre

25 October Friendly	Hong Kong	5–0	Malaysia	Kowloon, Hong Kong
18:00 UTC+8	Leung H.K. 2' (pen.), 33', 47'; Chan Y.H. 59'; Kwan W.Y. 85'	Report		Stadium: Kai Tak Youth Sports Ground

29 November Friendly	Liechtenstein	1–4	Hong Kong	Eschen, Liechtenstein
14:00	Hürlimann 90+3'	Report	Leung H.K. 45', 54', 83' (pen.); Wong T.K. 90+1'	Stadium: Sportpark Eschen-Mauren; Attendance: 170; Referee: Déborah Anex (Switzerland)

==== U-17 ====
8 July Lion City Cup 2025	Cambodia	0–4	Hong Kong	Kallang, Singapore
17:00 UTC+8				Stadium: Jalan Besar Stadium

10 July Lion City Cup 2025	Hong Kong	0–2	Singapore	Kallang, Singapore
20:00 UTC+8				Stadium: Jalan Besar Stadium

12 July Lion City Cup 2025	Hong Kong	1–8	South Korea	Kallang, Singapore
17:00 UTC+8				Stadium: Jalan Besar Stadium

15 October 2026 AFC U-17 WACQ	Hong Kong	7–1	Guam	Ho Chi Minh City, Vietnam
16:00 UTC+7	Wan Tsz Yau 3'; Cheng Reina 22', 47'; Wong Tsz Yiu 40'; Chong Ching Lam 45'; Chua Sophia 50', 65'	Report	Ettleman 20'	Stadium: Gò Đậu Stadium; Referee: Wang Chieh (Chinese Taipei)

17 October 2026 AFC U-17 WACQ	Vietnam	1–0	Hong Kong	Ho Chi Minh City, Vietnam
16:00 UTC+7	Ngô Hải Yến 66'	Report		Stadium: Gò Đậu Stadium; Referee: Esraa Almbaiden (Jordan)

==== U-17 Futsal ====
23 October 2025 AYG GS	Hong Kong	0–6	Iran	Isa Town, Bahrain
17:30 UTC+3		Report	Chan Kit Kwan 15'33" (o.g.); Yarisararoudi 18'23"; Mohammadi 20'13"; Rahmani 25'04"; Zarehaghighi 26'37"; Bagheri 35'50"	Stadium: Khalifa Sports City Hall; Attendance: 78; Referee: Reem Al-Bishi (Saudi Arabia)

24 October 2025 AYG GS	Hong Kong	1–10	China	Isa Town, Bahrain
10:00 UTC+3	Tsang Tsz Ching 17'55"	Report	Chang Mengying 9'27", 15'16"; Ding Kejia 10'43", 34'56"; Peng Yaqi 13'57"; Ren Yunuo 23'44"; Pan Ziya 26'10"; Lian Yutong 29'37"; Zhang Yamingli 35'54"; Zhao Zitong 38'19" (2pen.)	Stadium: Khalifa Sports City Hall; Attendance: 30; Referee: Panadda Khotsenaphattra (Thailand)

25 October 2025 AYG GS	Bahrain	2–3	Hong Kong	Isa Town, Bahrain
12:30 UTC+3	El Marsafawy 16'26" (pen.); Al-Doseri 16'41"	Report	Tsang Tsz Ching 8'57", 15'50"; Hung Wing Tung Xyza 21'32"	Stadium: Khalifa Sports City Hall; Attendance: 80; Referee: Zahra Rahimi (Iran)

26 October 2025 AYG GS	Chinese Taipei	15–1	Hong Kong	Isa Town, Bahrain
10:00 UTC+3	Hsu Jung-chia 5'28", 7'28", 10'59", 32'57"; Wang Ping-en 8'32", 30'21", 39'32"; Hou Yu-xuan 11'10", 15'53", 35'02", 35'44"; Lin Yu-xuan 16'11", 34'13"; Fan Rou-tung 19'22"; Liang Pin-wei 29'46"	Report	Tsang Tsz Ching 39'49"	Stadium: Khalifa Sports City Hall; Attendance: 23; Referee: Nour Chaito (Lebanon)

28 October 2025 AYG SF	China	9–0	Hong Kong	Isa Town, Bahrain
12:30 UTC+3	Ren Yunuo 0'09"; Peng Yaqi 2'26", 25'01"; Zhang Lubi 8'28", 14'54"; Xu Xinyi 16'14"; Zhao Zitong 18'56"; Huang Zixi 35'56"; Wang Meijia 38'48"	Report		Stadium: Khalifa Sports City Hall; Attendance: 88; Referee: Reem Al-Bishi (Saudi Arabia)

29 October 2025 AYG 3rd place	Hong Kong	1–6	Chinese Taipei	Isa Town, Bahrain
16:00 UTC+3	Chan Oi Ling 39'19"	Report	Hou Yu-xuan 8'39", 20'53"; Hsu Jung-chia 13'03"; Shen Wun-jia 31'49"; Ku Hsuan 33'08", 39'42"	Stadium: Khalifa Sports City Hall; Attendance: 175; Referee: Nazemideylami Gelareh (Iran)

== Club competitions ==
=== League (men) ===
==== Promotion and relegation ====
League	Promoted to league	Relegated from league
Hong Kong Premier League	Eastern District	N/A
Hong Kong First Division League	Tung Sing; Supreme FC	Tuen Mun; Wing Yee
Hong Kong Second Division League	Kui Tan; Gospel	Sun Hei; Sai Kung
Hong Kong Third Division League		Pak Hei

==== Hong Kong Premier League ====
Pos	Team	Pld	W	D	L	GF	GA	GD	Pts	Qualification or relegation
1	Tai Po (C)	24	17	4	3	62	31	+31	55	Qualification for AFC Champions League Two group stage
2	Lee Man	24	17	2	5	54	33	+21	53	
3	Eastern	24	15	6	3	54	25	+29	51	Qualification for AFC Champions League Two group stage (Note: Eastern qualified for the AFC Champions League Two group stage as the 2024–25 Hong Kong FA Cup winners.)
4	Kitchee	24	12	6	6	55	25	+30	42	
5	Southern	24	7	7	10	34	35	−1	28	
6	Kowloon City	24	7	3	14	36	65	−29	24	
7	Rangers	24	6	5	13	38	53	−15	23	
8	North District	24	5	3	16	37	65	−28	18	
9	HKFC	24	3	2	19	21	59	−38	11	

Source: Hong Kong Football Association
Rules for classification: 1) Points; 2) Head-to-head points; 3) Head-to-head goal difference; 4) Head-to-head goals scored; 5) Goal difference; 6) Goals scored; 7) Fair-play points; 8) Drawing lots (Play-off if the winner has to be decided).
(C) Champions

==== Hong Kong First Division League ====
Pos	Team	Pld	W	D	L	GF	GA	GD	Pts	Promotion or relegation
1	Citizen (C)	24	17	5	2	72	25	+47	56	
2	Central & Western	24	17	4	3	68	14	+54	55	
3	Hoi King	24	15	0	9	59	40	+19	45	
4	3 Sing	24	13	4	7	48	32	+16	43	
5	Yuen Long	24	11	6	7	35	34	+1	39	
6	South China	24	11	5	8	58	43	+15	38 (Note: South China are ahead of Resources Capital on goal difference: South China 15, Resources Capital -3)	
7	Resources Capital	24	12	2	10	46	49	−3	38	
8	Eastern District (P)	24	10	4	10	42	42	0	34	Promotion to the Premier League
9	WSE	24	9	3	12	44	40	+4	30	
10	Sha Tin	24	8	4	12	40	46	−6	28	
11	Sham Shui Po	24	7	4	13	30	43	−13	25	
12	Tuen Mun (R)	24	4	3	17	34	75	−41	15	Relegation to the Second Division
13	Wing Yee (R)	24	0	0	24	9	102	−93	0	Relegation to the Second Division

Source: Hong Kong Football Association
Rules for classification: 1) Points; 2) Head-to-head points; 3) Head-to-head goal difference; 4) Head-to-head goals scored; 5) Goal difference; 6) Goals scored; 7) Fair-play points; 8) Drawing lots
(C) Champions; (P) Promoted; (R) Relegated

==== Hong Kong Second Division League ====
Pos	Team	Pld	W	D	L	GF	GA	GD	Pts	Promotion or relegation
1	Tung Sing	14	11	3	0	30	10	+20	36	Qualification for the Championship round
2	Supreme FC	14	11	2	1	37	13	+24	35	Qualification for the Championship round
3	Fu Moon	14	9	2	3	31	21	+10	29	Qualification for the Championship round
4	Kwun Tong	14	8	3	3	24	10	+14	27	Qualification for the Championship round
5	Lucky Mile	14	8	2	4	27	17	+10	26	Qualification for the Championship round
6	Kwai Tsing	14	6	4	4	24	20	+4	22	Qualification for the Championship round
7	Yau Tsim Mong	14	6	2	6	27	17	+10	20	Qualification for the Championship round
8	Wong Tai Sin	14	5	4	5	16	19	−3	19	Qualification for the Championship round
9	Mutual	14	4	4	6	17	25	−8	16	Qualification for the Relegation round
10	Leaper	14	4	2	8	20	22	−2	14	Qualification for the Relegation round
11	Tsuen Wan	14	3	5	6	11	20	−9	14	Qualification for the Relegation round
12	Wing Go	14	4	1	9	16	30	−14	13	Qualification for the Relegation round
13	Kwong Wah	14	2	3	9	16	33	−17	9	Qualification for the Relegation round
14	Sun Hei	14	1	5	8	11	29	−18	8	Qualification for the Relegation round
15	Sai Kung	14	0	4	10	15	36	−21	4	Qualification for the Relegation round

Source: Hong Kong Football Association
Rules for classification: 1) Points; 2) Head-to-head points; 3) Head-to-head goal difference; 4) Head-to-head goals scored; 5) Goal difference; 6) Goals scored; 7) Fair-play points; 8) Drawing lots

==== Hong Kong Third Division League ====
Pos	Team	Pld	W	D	L	GF	GA	GD	Pts	Promotion or relegation
1	Kui Tan	15	15	0	0	65	17	+48	45	Qualification for the Championship round
2	Sui Tung	15	10	3	2	35	13	+22	33	Qualification for the Championship round
3	Gospel	15	9	3	3	29	17	+12	30	Qualification for the Championship round
4	Wan Chai	15	8	4	3	22	15	+7	28	Qualification for the Championship round
5	Kowloon Cricket Club	15	7	5	3	19	15	+4	26	Qualification for the Championship round
6	Fukien	15	8	2	5	29	25	+4	26	Qualification for the Championship round
7	Double Flower	15	7	2	6	28	20	+8	23	Qualification for the Championship round
8	Tsun Tat	15	6	3	6	29	29	0	21	Qualification for the Championship round
9	Ravia SA	15	6	3	6	31	36	−5	21	Qualification for the Relegation round
10	KCDRSC	15	5	3	7	28	31	−3	18	Qualification for the Relegation round
11	Konter	15	4	3	8	21	26	−5	15	Qualification for the Relegation round
12	Islands	15	3	3	9	12	26	−14	12	Qualification for the Relegation round
13	Ling Yui Orion	15	3	2	10	27	49	−22	11	Qualification for the Relegation round
14	Tuen Mun FC	15	3	2	10	13	23	−10	11	Qualification for the Relegation round
15	Pak Hei	15	3	1	11	22	48	−26	10	Qualification for the Relegation round
16	St. Joseph's	15	1	5	9	13	33	−20	8	Qualification for the Relegation round

Source: Hong Kong Football Association

=== First round ===
8 September 2024 SS01	Southern	3–0	Kowloon City	Sham Shui Po Sports Ground
15:30	Gregory 16', 70'; Jackson 89'	Report		Attendance: 460; Referee: Yu Kin Fung

=== Quarter-finals ===
26 October 2024 SS02	Rangers	1–0	HKFC	Tai Po Sports Ground
15:00	Yiu Ho Ming 45'	Report		Attendance: 145; Referee: Ho Wai Sing

26 October 2024 SS05	Kitchee	3–1	Tai Po	Mong Kok Stadium
15:00	Bae Jae-woo 30'; Temirov 38'; Mingazow 64'	Report	Cividini 52'	Attendance: 1,412; Referee: Luk Kin Sun

27 October 2024 SS04	Lee Man	5–1	North District	Tai Po Sports Ground
15:00	Anier 9', 45', 52', 65'; Hamad 62'	Report	Lo Kong Wai 38'	Attendance: 327; Referee: Tam Ping Wun

23 November 2024 SS03	Eastern	1–0	Southern	Mong Kok Stadium
18:00	Bertomeu 1'	Report		Attendance: 812; Referee: Tam Ping Wun

=== Semi-finals ===
30 November 2024 SS06	Lee Man	2–1	Kitchee	Mong Kok Stadium
15:00	Anier 16'; Everton 47'	Report	Temirov 45+4'	Attendance: 1,573; Referee: Lau Fong Hei

1 December 2024 SS07	Rangers	1–3	Eastern	Tseung Kwan O Sports Ground
15:00	Lau Chi Lok 44'	Report	Baffoe 10', 90+2'; Almazan 50'	Attendance: 509; Referee: Luk Kin Sun

=== Final ===
30 January 2025 SS08	Eastern	1–0	Lee Man	Mong Kok Stadium
15:00	Bertomeu 32'	Report		Attendance: 4,495; Referee: Ho Wai Sing

==== Hong Kong FA Cup ====
Times are in Hong Kong Time (UTC+08:00).

=== First round ===
2 February 2025	Rangers	2–1 (a.e.t.)	North District	Tai Po
15:00	Ibrahim 45+3'; Lau Chi Lok 103'	Report	Chulapa 21'	Stadium: Tai Po Sports Ground; Attendance: 268; Referee: Wong Wai Lun

=== Quarter-finals ===
1 March 2025	Kitchee	2–3 (a.e.t.)	Tai Po	Mong Kok
15:00	Fernando 14'; Temirov 26'	Report	Chan Siu Kwan 39', 83', 115'	Stadium: Mong Kok Stadium; Attendance: 1,648; Referee: Lau Fong Hei

1 March 2025	Lee Man	1–2	Rangers	Tsing Yi
18:30	Anier 58'	Report	Luizinho 32'; Hayashi 85'	Stadium: Tsing Yi Sports Ground; Attendance: 394; Referee: Luk Kin Sun

2 March 2025	Eastern	3–1	Kowloon City	Sham Shui Po
15:00	Baffoe 21', 25'; Sá 48'	Report	Kayron 66'	Stadium: Sham Shui Po Sports Ground; Attendance: 621; Referee: Poon Chun Kit

2 March 2025	HKFC	2–0	Southern	Tsing Yi
18:30	Léo 29' (pen.); Bennie 88'	Report		Stadium: Tsing Yi Sports Ground; Attendance: 209; Referee: Tam Ping Wun

=== Semi-finals ===
19 April 2025	HKFC	1–4	Rangers	Mong Kok
15:00 UTC+8	Léo 54'	Report	Lau Chi Lok 16'; Li Wing Ho 31'; Ansah 45+2'; Biteco 62'	Stadium: Mong Kok Stadium; Attendance: 882; Referee: Poon Chun Kit

20 April 2025	Tai Po	1–2 (a.e.t.)	Eastern	Mong Kok
15:00 UTC+8	Renner 45+2'	Report	Baffoe 30', 112' (pen.)	Stadium: Mong Kok Stadium; Attendance: 2,193; Referee: Yu Kin Fung

=== Final ===
31 May 2025	Rangers	1–3	Eastern	Mong Kok
15:00 UTC+8	Lau Chi Lok 9'	Report	Baffoe 80', 81', 84'	Stadium: Mong Kok Stadium; Attendance: 3,392; Referee: Tam Ping Wun

==== Group A ====
Pos	Team	Pld	W	D	L	GF	GA	GD	Pts	Qualification
1	Tai Po	4	3	1	0	11	5	+6	10	Advance to Semi-finals
2	Eastern	4	2	1	1	9	4	+5	7	Advance to Semi-finals
3	North District	4	1	2	1	8	8	0	5 (Note: Head-to-head points: North District 1, Kitchee 1; Goal difference: North District 0, Kitchee −1)	
4	Kitchee	4	1	2	1	5	6	−1	5	
5	HKFC	4	0	0	4	3	13	−10	0	

Source: HKFA
Rules for classification: 1) Points; 2) Head-to-head points; 3) Head-to-head goal difference; 4) Head-to-head goals scored; 5) Goal difference; 6) Goals scored; 7) Fair-play points;
Notes:

13 October 2024	Tai Po	2–1	Eastern	Tai Po, New Territories
15:00	Sartori 12'; Cividini 82'	Report	Leung Kwun Chung 54'	Stadium: Tai Po Sports Ground; Attendance: 586; Referee: Ho Wai Sing

13 October 2024	HKFC	1–3	North District	Diamond Hill, Kowloon
15:00	Lam Chi Fung 70'	Report	Chulapa 5', 77'; Khan 65'	Stadium: Hammer Hill Road Sports Ground; Attendance: 155; Referee: Yu Kin Fung

16 November 2024	North District	1–1	Kitchee	Sheung Shui, New Territories
15:00	Chulapa 22'	Report	Welthon 15'	Stadium: North District Sports Ground; Attendance: 288; Referee: Wong Po Sing

16 November 2024	Eastern	4–0	HKFC	Tsing Yi, New Territories
18:00	Bertomeu 6', 38'; Hall 11'; Wong Ho Chun 72'	Report		Stadium: Tsing Yi Sports Ground; Attendance: 217; Referee: Poon Chun Kit

8 December 2024	Kitchee	3–1	HKFC	Diamond Hill, Kowloon
15:00	Law Tsz Chun 11'; Rey 27'; Mingazow 30'	Report	Scally 36'	Stadium: Hammer Hill Road Sports Ground; Attendance: 232; Referee: Luk Kin Sun

8 December 2024	Tai Po	3–3	North District	Sheung Shui, New Territories
15:00	Ho Chun Ting 56' (o.g.); Marcão 68'; Renner 72'	Report	Khan 39'; Kendy 41', 90+5' (pen.)	Stadium: North District Sports Ground; Attendance: 269; Referee: Woo Chun Sing

15 December 2024	North District	1–3	Eastern	Sheung Shui, New Territories
15:00	Yip Cheuk Man 34'	Report	Baffoe 59', 90+4'; Leung Kwun Chung 67'	Stadium: North District Sports Ground; Attendance: 221; Referee: Cheung Wai Lung

15 December 2024	Kitchee	0–3	Tai Po	Tsing Yi, New Territories
18:00		Report	Marcão 60'; Renner 67'; Sartori 90'	Stadium: Tsing Yi Sports Ground; Attendance: 290; Referee: Wong Po Sing

22 March 2025	HKFC	1–3	Tai Po	Siu Sai Wan, Hong Kong Island
15:00	Kedwards 87'	Report	Sartori 43' (pen.); Renner 74'; Padilla 90+4'	Stadium: Siu Sai Wan Sports Ground; Attendance: 592; Referee: Poon Chun Kit

22 March 2025	Eastern	1–1	Kitchee	Siu Sai Wan, Hong Kong Island
18:00	Gao Ming Ho 86'	Report	Haddow 50'	Stadium: Siu Sai Wan Sports Ground; Attendance: 592; Referee: Luk Kin Sun

==== Group B ====
Pos	Team	Pld	W	D	L	GF	GA	GD	Pts	Qualification
1	Southern	3	2	0	1	5	1	+4	6 (Note: Head-to-head points: Southern 3, Lee Man 3, Rangers 3; Head-to-head goal difference: Southern 0, Lee Man 0, Rangers 0; Head-to-head goals scored: Southern 1, Lee Man 1, Rangers 1; Goal difference: Southern +4, Lee Man +3, Rangers +1)	Advance to Semi-finals
2	Lee Man	3	2	0	1	5	2	+3	6	Advance to Semi-finals
3	Rangers	3	2	0	1	3	2	+1	6	
4	Kowloon City	3	0	0	3	2	10	−8	0	

Source: HKFA
Rules for classification: 1) Points; 2) Head-to-head points; 3) Head-to-head goal difference; 4) Head-to-head goals scored; 5) Goal difference; 6) Goals scored; 7) Fair-play points;
Notes:

12 October 2024	Rangers	0–1	Lee Man	Mong Kok, Kowloon
15:00		Report	Martínez 63'	Stadium: Mong Kok Stadium; Attendance: 574; Referee: Wong Wai Lun

12 October 2024	Southern	4–0	Kowloon City	Tsing Yi, New Territories
18:00	Gregory 10', 61'; Jackson 70'; Yau Cheuk Fung 90+1'	Report		Stadium: Tsing Yi Sports Ground; Attendance: 276; Referee: Tang Hing Fu

17 November 2024	Rangers	2–1	Kowloon City	Siu Sai Wan, Hong Kong Island
15:00	Lau Chi Lok 58', 74'	Report	Lam Hok Hei 82'	Stadium: Siu Sai Wan Sports Ground; Attendance: 410; Referee: Woo Chun Sing

17 November 2024	Lee Man	0–1	Southern	Siu Sai Wan, Hong Kong Island
18:00		Report	Chan Hoi Pak 58'	Stadium: Siu Sai Wan Sports Ground; Attendance: 410; Referee: Ho Wai Sing

15 December 2024	Kowloon City	1–4	Lee Man	Sham Shui Po, Kowloon
15:00	Yu Pui Hong 71'	Report	Rosa 7'; Seong Min-gyu 42' (o.g.); Law Cheuk Hei 53'; Yu Pui Hong 59' (o.g.)	Stadium: Sham Shui Po Sports Ground; Attendance: 455; Referee: Tang Hing Fu

26 March 2025	Southern	0–1	Rangers	Mong Kok, Kowloon
19:30		Report	Ibrahim 35'	Stadium: Mong Kok Stadium; Attendance: 297; Referee: Tam Ping Wun

=== Semi-finals ===
9 April 2025	Southern	1–0	Eastern	Mong Kok Stadium
20:00	Pereira 90+4' (pen.)	Report		Attendance: 716; Referee: Tam Ping Wun

16 April 2025	Tai Po	1–1 (a.e.t.) (2–4 p)	Lee Man	Mong Kok Stadium
20:00	Moreno 90+3'	Report	Anier 82' (pen.)	Attendance: 1,133; Referee: Liu Kwok Man
	Penalties
	Lucas (penalty scored); Valverde (penalty scored); Montaño (penalty missed); Moreno (penalty missed)		(penalty scored) Simionato; (penalty scored) Tafazolli; (penalty scored) Everton; (penalty scored) Tachibana

=== Final ===
1 May 2025	Lee Man	0–4	Southern	Mong Kok Stadium
17:30		Report	Acosta 25'; Pereira 32'; Kessi 35'; Ichikawa 67'	Attendance: 3,072; Referee: Lau Fong Hei

== See also ==
- Hong Kong Football Association
- Hong Kong national football team
- Hong Kong women's national football team
- Hong Kong national under-23 football team
- Hong Kong national under-20 football team
- Hong Kong national under-17 football team
