= Ng Ka Yeung =

Hong Kong footballer

Personal information
- Full name: Ng Ka Yeung
- Date of birth: 2 May 2001 (age 25)
- Place of birth: Hong Kong
- Height: 1.81 m (5 ft 11 in)
- Position: Winger

Youth career
- 2013–2017: CFCSSHK

Senior career*
Years	Team	Apps	(Gls)
2018	Happy Valley	2	(1)
2018–2019	CFCSSHK	20	(10)
2019–2021	Happy Valley	14	(1)
2021–2022	Eastern	0	(0)
2022–2023	Resources Capital	12	(0)
2023–2024	Kowloon City	18	(1)
2025	Sham Shui Po	5	(0)

International career
2019	Hong Kong U-19	6	(0)
2021	Hong Kong U-22	1	(0)
- * Club domestic league appearances and goals

Ng Ka Yeung (Chinese: 伍家揚; born 2 May 2001) is a former Hong Kong professional footballer who played as a winger.

== Club career ==
In July 2019, Ng signed his first professional contract with Hong Kong Premier League club Happy Valley.

On 9 August 2021, Ng joined Eastern. He left the club on 9 July 2022. On 11 August 2022, Ng joined Resources Capital.
