= Hui Ka Lok =

Hong Kong footballer

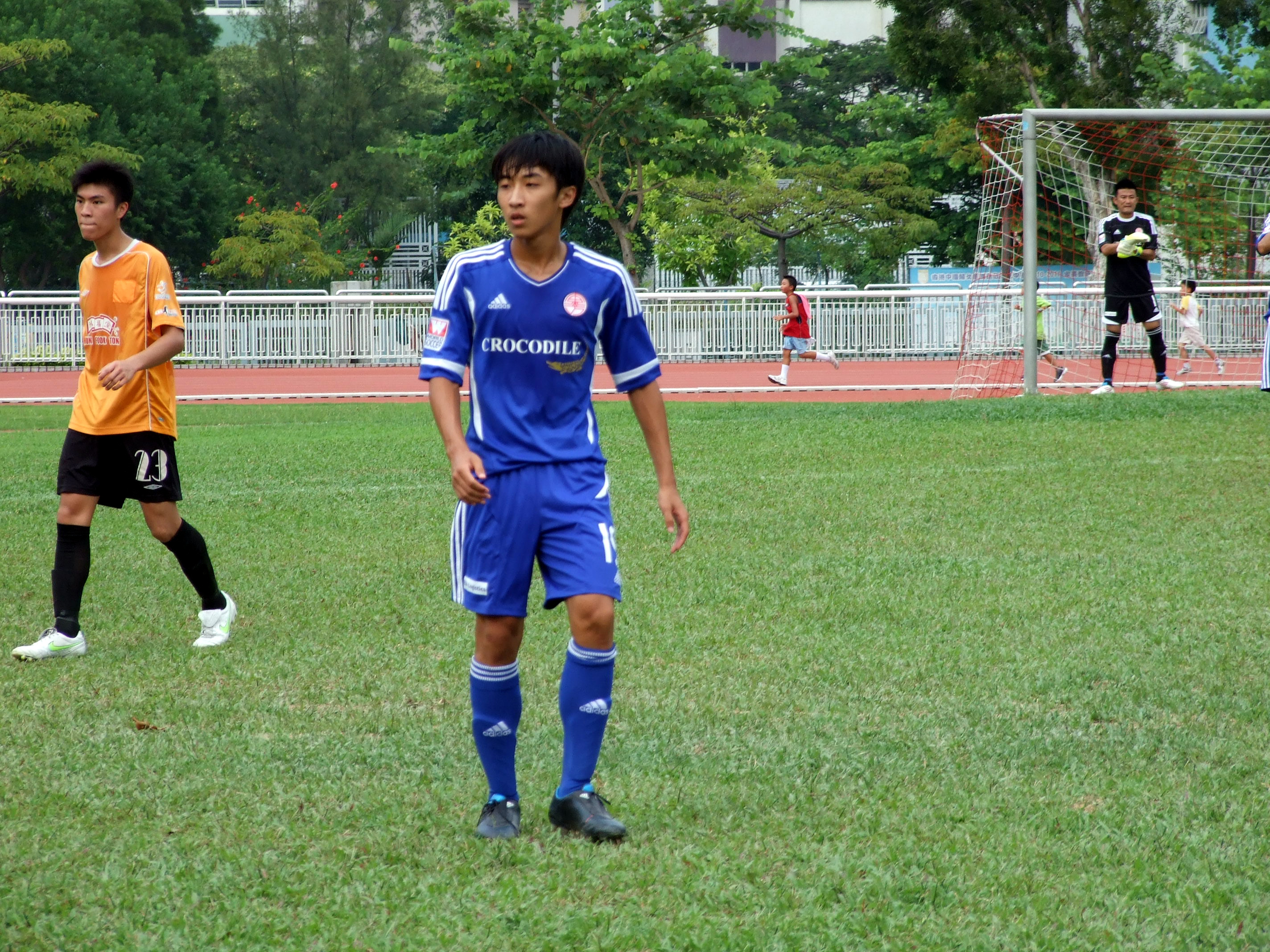

Personal information
- Full name: Hui Ka Lok
- Date of birth: 5 January 1994 (age 32)
- Place of birth: Hong Kong
- Height: 1.69 m (5 ft 7 in)
- Position: Right winger

Team information
- Current team: Kowloon City
- Number: 25

Youth career
- 2006–2009: Eastern

Senior career*
Years	Team	Apps	(Gls)
2009–2013	Eastern	58	(31)
2013–2015	YFCMD	13	(2)
2015–2017	Rangers (HKG)	32	(1)
2017–2019	Lee Man	16	(0)
2019	→ Hoi King (loan)	3	(0)
2019–2020	Tai Po	7	(0)
2020–2022	Sham Shui Po	16	(3)
2022–	Kowloon City	62	(14)

International career^{‡}
2015	Hong Kong U-23	6	(1)
2016	Hong Kong	1	(0)

Managerial career
- 2023–: Kowloon City (assistant coach)
- * Club domestic league appearances and goals as of 16 May 2026 ‡ National team caps and goals as of 6 June 2016

Hui Ka Lok (Chinese: 許嘉樂; Jyutping: heoi^{2} gaa^{1} lok^{6}; born 5 January 1994) is a Hong Kong professional footballer who currently plays as a right winger for Hong Kong Premier League club Kowloon City. He is also the assistant coach of the club.

== Club career ==
In 2014, Hui signed for Hong Kong Premier League club YFCMD.

In 2015, Hui signed for Hong Kong Premier League club Rangers.

On 25 October 2015, Hui scored his first goal in Hong Kong Premier League against Eastern, which wins the match 2:0.

On 3 July 2017, it was announced that Lee Man had signed Hui.

On 20 December 2018, Lee Man announced the loan of Hui to Hoi King for the second half of the 2018–19 season.

On 29 July 2019, it was announced that Hui had joined Tai Po.

On 2 November 2020, Hui signed for Hong Kong First Division club Sham Shui Po.

In July 2022, Hui joined Kowloon City.

== International career ==
On 14 November 2015, Hui scored his first goal for Hong Kong against Macau in the Hong Kong–Macau Interport, helping the team to win the match 2:0.

On 6 June 2016, Hui made his international debut for Hong Kong in a 2016 AYA Bank Cup match against Myanmar.
