= 2024–25 Hong Kong First Division League =

Hong Kong First Division
- Season: 2024–25
- Champions: Citizen
- Promoted: Eastern District
- Relegated: Tuen Mun; Wing Yee
- Matches played: 156
- Goals scored: 585 (3.75 per match)
- Top goalscorer: Yang Yu-min (Hoi King) (21 goals)
- Biggest home win: Central & Western 7–0 Resources Capital (6 October 2024); Central & Western 7–0 Wing Yee (11 May 2025)
- Biggest away win: Wing Yee 1–7 Hoi King (12 January 2025); Tuen Mun 1–7 Citizen (23 March 2025)
- Highest scoring: Wing Yee 2–6 Citizen (6 April 2025); WSE 3–5 3 Sing (18 May 2025)
- Longest winning run: Citizen (7 matches)
- Longest unbeaten run: Citizen (14 matches)
- Longest winless run: Wing Yee (24 matches)
- Longest losing run: Wing Yee (24 matches)

The 2024–25 Hong Kong First Division League was the 11th season of Hong Kong First Division since it became the second-tier football league in Hong Kong in 2014–15. The season began on 15 September 2024 and ended on 18 May 2025.

== Teams ==
=== Changes from last season ===
==== From First Division ====
===== Promoted to the Hong Kong Premier League =====
- Kowloon City

===== Relegated to the Second Division =====
- Sai Kung
- Wong Tai Sin

==== To First Division ====
===== Promoted from the Second Division =====
- Wofoo Social Enterprises
- Tuen Mun

===== Relegated from the Hong Kong Premier League =====
- Sham Shui Po
- Resources Capital

== League table ==
Pos	Team	Pld	W	D	L	GF	GA	GD	Pts	Promotion or relegation
1	Citizen (C)	24	17	5	2	72	25	+47	56	
2	Central & Western	24	17	4	3	68	14	+54	55	
3	Hoi King	24	15	0	9	59	40	+19	45	
4	3 Sing	24	13	4	7	48	32	+16	43	
5	Yuen Long	24	11	6	7	35	34	+1	39	
6	South China	24	11	5	8	58	43	+15	38 (Note: South China are ahead of Resources Capital on goal difference: South China 15, Resources Capital -3)	
7	Resources Capital	24	12	2	10	46	49	−3	38	
8	Eastern District (P)	24	10	4	10	42	42	0	34	Promotion to the Premier League
9	WSE	24	9	3	12	44	40	+4	30	
10	Sha Tin	24	8	4	12	40	46	−6	28	
11	Sham Shui Po	24	7	4	13	30	43	−13	25	
12	Tuen Mun (R)	24	4	3	17	34	75	−41	15	Relegation to the Second Division
13	Wing Yee (R)	24	0	0	24	9	102	−93	0	Relegation to the Second Division

Source: Hong Kong Football Association
Rules for classification: 1) Points; 2) Head-to-head points; 3) Head-to-head goal difference; 4) Head-to-head goals scored; 5) Goal difference; 6) Goals scored; 7) Fair-play points; 8) Drawing lots
(C) Champions; (P) Promoted; (R) Relegated
