= Chan Ming Kong =

Hong Kong footballer

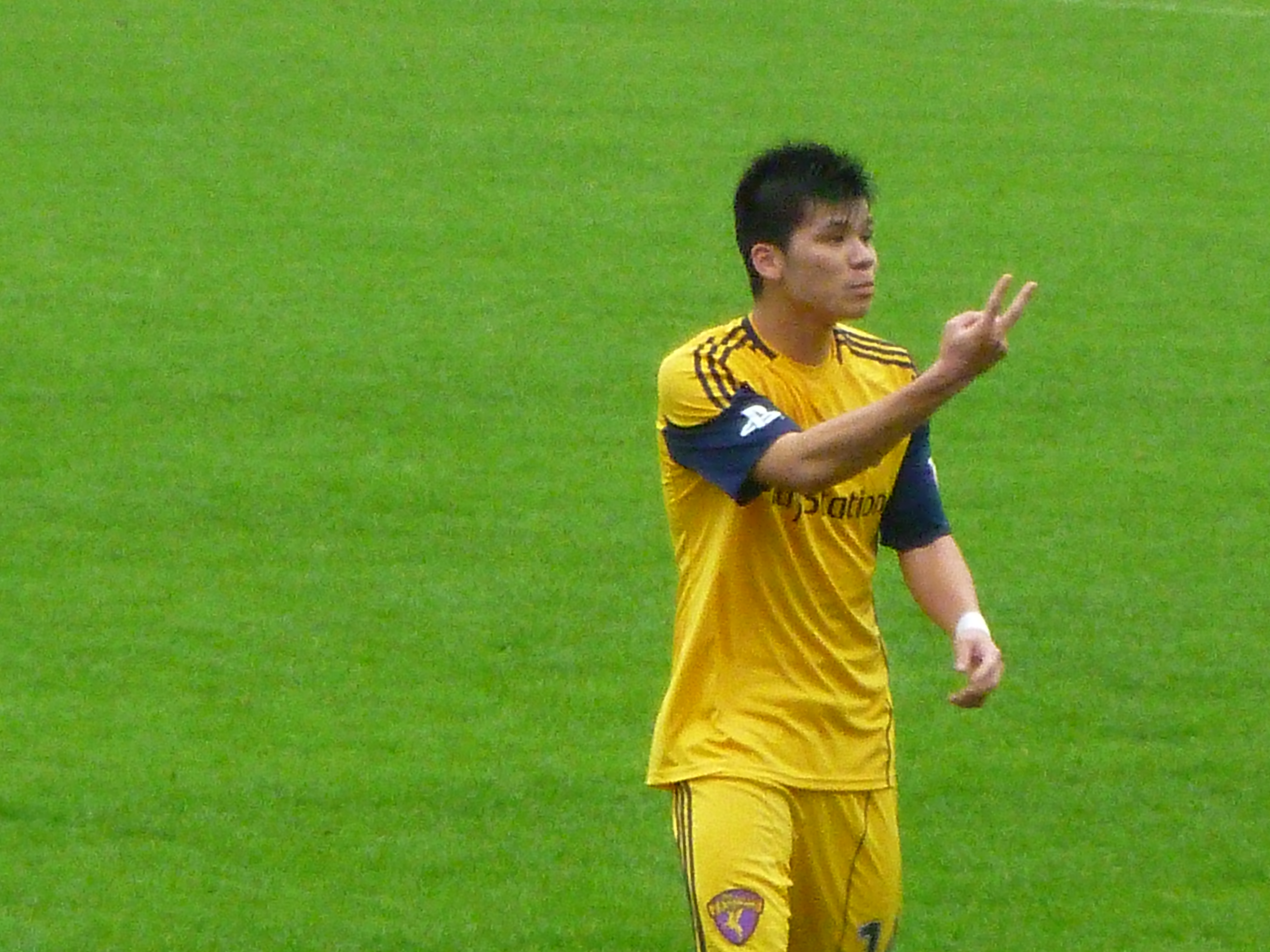

Personal information
- Full name: Chan Ming Kong
- Date of birth: 1 July 1985 (age 41)
- Place of birth: Hong Kong
- Height: 1.75 m (5 ft 9 in)
- Position: Midfielder

Senior career*
| Years | Team | Apps | (Gls) |
| 2005 | Xiangxue Pharmaceutical | 7 | (0) |
| 2005–2007 | Hong Kong 08 | 22 | (1) |
| 2007–2009 | Citizen | 12 | (0) |
| 2009–2010 | Happy Valley | 14 | (1) |
| 2010–2012 | Pegasus | 26 | (1) |
| 2012–2013 | Southern | 5 | (0) |
| 2013–2017 | Rangers (HKG) | 34 | (1) |
| 2017–2020 | Lee Man | 15 | (0) |
| 2020–2022 | Sham Shui Po | 20 | (1) |
| 2023–2024 | Konter | 14 | (1) |

Managerial career
- 2023: Sham Shui Po (assistant coach)
- 2023–: Konter
- 2024–2025: Kowloon City
- 2025: Kowloon City (advisor)
- 2025: Kowloon City
- * Club domestic league appearances and goals as of 30 June 2024

Chan Ming Kong (Chinese: 陳銘剛; Cantonese Yale: Chàhn Mìhnggōng ; born 1 July 1985) is a Hong Kong football coach and former professional footballer who played as a midfielder.

== Club career ==
=== Hong Kong 08 ===
Chan started his senior football career in Hong Kong 08. He made his first ever Hong Kong First Division appearances in a match against Happy Valley on 9 October 2005. He made a total of 9 appearances in his first First Division season.

Chan was the captain of the team at the beginning of the 2006–07 season, and played as the captain for 4 matches. He made 13 league appearances and scored 1 goal in a match against Kitchee on 10 September 2006, although the goal did not help the team to win the game.

=== Citizen ===
Chan joined Citizen after Hong Kong 08 was dissolved.

Chan played his first league game for Citizen in a match against Rangers as a first XI, helping the team to win 4–0. He featured a total number of 9 league games in the 2007–08 season.

In the 2008–09 season, Chan did not feature too many league games, only making 3 appearances, including 2 on the starting line-up.

Chan then left the club and joined Happy Valley.

=== Happy Valley ===
Chan joined Happy Valley after spending 2 seasons in Citizen. He scored his first First Division goal for Happy Valley in a match against South China on 24 January 2010, but the goal did not help the team to win the match, which suffered a 2–6 defeat.

=== Pegasus ===
Chan transferred to Pegasus after Happy Valley failed to stay in the First Division. He played an important role in Pegasus, playing most of the matches for the team.

In the 2010–11 season, he made 16 league appearances out of 18 league games for Pegasus as a central midfielder. Although he did not score any league goal, his great passing vision and creativity helped the team to achieve great results. For cup matches, he played 3 league cup matches and 2 FA Cup matches. He scored 1 cup goal in the Hong Kong League Cup final against South China on 27 March 2011. However, his goal was not enough for the team to become the champions. Pegasus was one of the Hong Kong clubs which featured 2011 AFC Cup group stage. Chan played all 6 group stage matches. However, the team did not qualify for the knock-out stage.

In the 2011–12 season, he was not as important as in the previous season, only making 10 league appearances since he faced great competition from Lau Nim Yat, Lau Ka Shing, Li Ka Chun and Eugene Mbome for his position. He made 4 Hong Kong Senior Challenge Shield games and helped the team to reach the semi-final, having lost to South China in a two-legged tie. He also featured 2 matches for the team in Hong Kong League Cup and Hong Kong FA Cup respectively. After the season, he eventually left TSW Pegasus.

=== Southern ===
Chan joined newly promoted club Southern in June 2012. He made his debut for Southern on 1 September 2012, playing against Biu Chun Rangers at Sham Shui Po Sports Ground. The team eventually lost the match 3–1.

=== Lee Man ===
On 1 August 2017, it was revealed that Chan had joined Lee Man.

On 2 June 2020, Chan was named on a list of departures from the club.

== Managerial career ==
On 23 July 2024, Chan was appointed as the head coach of Kowloon City.

== Career statistics ==
=== Club ===
As of 1 October 2012

| Club performance | | | League | | Cup | | | | League Cup | | Continental | | Total | |
| Season | Club | League | Apps | Goals | Apps | Goals | Apps | Goals | Apps | Goals | Apps | Goals | Apps | Goals |
| Hong Kong | | | League | | Senior Shield | | FA Cup | | League Cup | | AFC Cup | | Total | |
|---|---|---|---|---|---|---|---|---|---|---|---|---|---|---|
| 2005–06 | Hong Kong 08 | First Division | 9 | 0 | 1 | 0 | 3 | 0 | 1 | 0 | N/A | N/A | 15 | 0 |
| 2006–07 | Hong Kong 08 | First Division | 13 | 1 | 1 | 0 | 4 | 0 | 1 | 0 | N/A | N/A | 19 | 1 |
| Hong Kong 08 total | | | 22 | 1 | 2 | 0 | 7 | 0 | 2 | 0 | 0 | 0 | 33 | 1 |
| 2007–08 | Citizen | First Division | 9 | 0 | 1 | 0 | 2 | 0 | 0 | 0 | N/A | N/A | 12 | 0 |
| 2008–09 | Citizen | First Division | 3 | 0 | 0 | 0 | 0 | 0 | 0 | 0 | N/A | N/A | 3 | 0 |
| Citizen total | | | 12 | 0 | 1 | 0 | 2 | 0 | 0 | 0 | 0 | 0 | 15 | 0 |
| 2009–10 | Happy Valley | First Division | 14 | 1 | 0 | 0 | 0 | 0 | 1 | 0 | N/A | N/A | 15 | 1 |
| Happy Valley total | | | 14 | 1 | 0 | 0 | 0 | 0 | 1 | 0 | 0 | 0 | 15 | 1 |
| 2010–11 | Pegasus | First Division | 16 | 0 | 0 | 0 | 3 | 1 | 2 | 0 | 6 | 0 | 27 | 1 |
| 2011–12 | Pegasus | First Division | 10 | 0 | 4 | 0 | 2 | 0 | 2 | 0 | N/A | N/A | 18 | 0 |
| Pegasus total | | | 26 | 0 | 4 | 0 | 5 | 1 | 2 | 0 | 6 | 0 | 43 | 1 |
| 2012–13 | Southern | First Division | 3 | 0 | 0 | 0 | 0 | 0 | 0 | 0 | N/A | N/A | 3 | 0 |
| Southern total | | | 3 | 0 | 0 | 0 | 0 | 0 | 0 | 0 | 0 | 0 | 3 | 0 |
| Career total | | | 77 | 2 | 7 | 0 | 14 | 1 | 5 | 0 | 6 | 0 | 109 | 3 |

== Honours ==
=== Club ===
Lee Man

- Hong Kong Sapling Cup: 2018–19
