= Darron Wilkinson (English footballer) =

English footballer

Personal information
- Full name: Darron Bromley Wilkinson
- Date of birth: 24 November 1969 (age 56)
- Place of birth: Reading, England
- Height: 5 ft 11 in (1.80 m)
- Position: Midfielder

Youth career
- Wokingham Town

Senior career*
Years	Team	Apps	(Gls)
198?–1992	Wokingham Town		
1992–1994	Brighton & Hove Albion	38	(3)
1994–1995	Kui Tan		
1995–1999	Hayes (Note: Infobox statistics cover Conference matches only.)	115	(4)
1999–2000	Woking	35	(?)
2000–2007	Slough Town	205	(2)

Managerial career
- 2007: Slough Town
- * Club domestic league appearances and goals

Darron Bromley Wilkinson (born 24 November 1969) is an English former professional footballer who played as a midfielder in the Football League for Brighton & Hove Albion.

== Life and career ==
Wilkinson was born in 1969 in Reading, Berkshire, and began his football career with Wokingham Town as a 13-year-old. He signed for Brighton & Hove Albion in 1992, and made 48 appearances in all competitions before being released two years later. After a season with Hong Kong First Division League club Kui Tan, he returned to England and joined Hayes, helping them win the 1995–96 Isthmian League title and with it promotion to the Conference. He made 203 appearances for the club, of which 115 were in the Conference, and captained the team in 1998–99, before moving on to another Conference club, Woking. He made 35 Conference appearances before joining Slough Town, where he was a regular in the team for seven seasons, including a year as player-coach and ten months as player-manager.

He continued his coaching career with clubs including Hayes & Yeading United's reserves, Beaconsfield SYCOB, Wokingham & Emmbrook, and Harrow Borough. Outside football, he works as a scaffolder.
