= 2023–24 Hong Kong First Division League =

Hong Kong First Division
- Season: 2023–24
- Champions: Kowloon City
- Promoted: Kowloon City
- Relegated: Sai Kung; Wong Tai Sin
- Matches played: 132
- Goals scored: 502 (3.8 per match)
- Top goalscorer: David Bala (Central & Western) (22 goals)
- Biggest home win: Central & Western 10–1 Wong Tai Sin (17 December 2023); South China 9–0 Sai Kung (5 November 2023)
- Biggest away win: Hoi King 1–8 Central & Western (14 January 2024); Wing Yee 0–7 South China (19 May 2024)
- Highest scoring: Central & Western 10–1 Wong Tai Sin (17 December 2023)
- Longest winning run: Central & Western (10 matches)
- Longest unbeaten run: Central & Western (14 matches)
- Longest winless run: Wong Tai Sin (12 matches)
- Longest losing run: Wong Tai Sin (10 matches)

The 2023–24 Hong Kong First Division League is the 10th season of Hong Kong First Division since it became the second-tier football league in Hong Kong in 2014–15. The season began on 15 October 2023 and ended on 26 May 2024.

== Teams ==
=== Changes from previous season ===
==== From First Division ====
===== Promoted to the Premier League =====
- North District

===== Relegated to the Second Division =====
- Leaper MG
- Kwai Tsing

===== Withdrawn from First Division =====
- Happy Valley

==== To First Division ====
===== Promoted from the Second Division =====
- 3 Sing
- Sai Kung

== League table ==
Pos	Team	Pld	W	D	L	GF	GA	GD	Pts	Promotion or relegation
1	Kowloon City (C, P)	22	18	2	2	57	21	+36	56	Promotion to the Premier League
2	Central & Western	22	15	5	2	71	32	+39	50	
3	South China	22	10	6	6	53	26	+27	36	
4	Sha Tin	22	10	4	8	51	41	+10	34	
5	3 Sing	22	9	6	7	42	31	+11	33	
6	Yuen Long	22	8	7	7	43	39	+4	31	
7	Citizen	22	9	3	10	35	38	−3	30	
8	Wing Yee	22	6	4	12	26	49	−23	22	
9	Eastern District	22	5	5	12	42	53	−11	20 (Note: Eastern District are ahead of Hoi King on head-to-head points: Eastern District 4, Hoi King 1)	
10	Hoi King	22	5	5	12	28	54	−26	20	
11	Sai Kung (R)	22	5	4	13	24	57	−33	19	Relegation to the Second Division
12	Wong Tai Sin (R)	22	5	3	14	29	60	−31	18	Relegation to the Second Division

Updated to match(es) played on 26 May 2024. Source: Hong Kong Football Association
Rules for classification: 1) Points; 2) Head-to-head points; 3) Head-to-head goal difference; 4) Head-to-head goals scored; 5) Goal difference; 6) Goals scored; 7) Fair-play points; 8) Drawing lots
(C) Champions; (P) Promoted; (R) Relegated
