= 2024–25 Hong Kong Third Division League =

Hong Kong Third Division
- Season: 2024–25
- Champions: Kui Tan
- Promoted: Kui Tan; Gospel; Sui Tung; Kowloon Cricket Club; Fukien; Wan Chai
- Relegated: Pak Hei
- Matches played: 176
- Goals scored: 615 (3.49 per match)
- Top goalscorer: Yeung Chi Lun (Kui Tan) (28 goals)
- Biggest home win: Kui Tan 8–0 Fukien (15 September 2024)
- Biggest away win: Ravia 0–10 Tuen Mun FC (23 March 2025)
- Highest scoring: Ravia 0–10 Tuen Mun FC (23 March 2025)
- Longest winning run: 19 matches Kui Tan
- Longest unbeaten run: 19 matches Kui Tan
- Longest winless run: 14 matches St. Joseph's
- Longest losing run: 9 matches St. Joseph's

The 2024–25 Hong Kong Third Division League was the 11th season of Hong Kong Third Division since it became the fourth-tier football league in Hong Kong in 2014–15. The season began on 1 September 2024 and ended on 11 May 2025.

Newly introduced this season, the league was split into two groups of eight teams: one championship group and one relegation group after a single round-robin had been played.

== Teams ==
=== Changes from last season ===
==== From Third Division ====
===== Promoted to Second Division =====
- Supreme FC
- Tsuen Wan

===== Eliminated from league =====
- Ornament

==== To Third Division ====
===== Relegated from Second Division =====
- Kowloon Cricket Club
- Wan Chai

===== New Clubs =====
- Pak Hei
- Ravia SA

== League table ==
Pos	Team	Pld	W	D	L	GF	GA	GD	Pts	Promotion or relegation
1	Kui Tan	15	15	0	0	65	17	+48	45	Qualification for the Championship round
2	Sui Tung	15	10	3	2	35	13	+22	33	Qualification for the Championship round
3	Gospel	15	9	3	3	29	17	+12	30	Qualification for the Championship round
4	Wan Chai	15	8	4	3	22	15	+7	28	Qualification for the Championship round
5	Kowloon Cricket Club	15	7	5	3	19	15	+4	26	Qualification for the Championship round
6	Fukien	15	8	2	5	29	25	+4	26	Qualification for the Championship round
7	Double Flower	15	7	2	6	28	20	+8	23	Qualification for the Championship round
8	Tsun Tat	15	6	3	6	29	29	0	21	Qualification for the Championship round
9	Ravia SA	15	6	3	6	31	36	−5	21	Qualification for the Relegation round
10	KCDRSC	15	5	3	7	28	31	−3	18	Qualification for the Relegation round
11	Konter	15	4	3	8	21	26	−5	15	Qualification for the Relegation round
12	Islands	15	3	3	9	12	26	−14	12	Qualification for the Relegation round
13	Ling Yui Orion	15	3	2	10	27	49	−22	11	Qualification for the Relegation round
14	Tuen Mun FC	15	3	2	10	13	23	−10	11	Qualification for the Relegation round
15	Pak Hei	15	3	1	11	22	48	−26	10	Qualification for the Relegation round
16	St. Joseph's	15	1	5	9	13	33	−20	8	Qualification for the Relegation round

Source: Hong Kong Football Association

== Championship round ==
Pos	Team	Pld	W	D	L	GF	GA	GD	Pts	Promotion or relegation
1	Kui Tan (C, P)	7	5	0	2	17	7	+10	60	Promotion to the Second Division
2	Gospel (P)	7	4	1	2	17	6	+11	43	Promotion to the Second Division
3	Sui Tung (P)	7	2	2	3	10	12	−2	41	Promotion to the Second Division
4	Kowloon Cricket Club (P)	7	4	2	1	10	6	+4	40	Promotion to the Second Division
5	Fukien (P)	7	2	2	3	6	7	−1	34 (Note: Fukein win head-to-head against Wan Chai)	Promotion to the Second Division
6	Wan Chai (P)	7	1	3	3	11	17	−6	34	Promotion to the Second Division
7	Tsun Tat	7	2	2	3	15	18	−3	29	
8	Double Flower	7	1	2	4	10	23	−13	28	

Source: Hong Kong Football Association
Rules for classification: 1) Points; 2) Head-to-head points; 3) Head-to-head goal difference; 4) Head-to-head goals scored; 5) Goal difference; 6) Goals scored; 7) Fair-play points; 8) Drawing lots
(C) Champions; (P) Promoted

== Relegation round ==
Pos	Team	Pld	W	D	L	GF	GA	GD	Pts	Promotion or relegation
1	Ravia	7	2	1	4	10	26	−16	28	
2	Konter	7	4	2	1	14	11	+3	29	
3	Tuen Mun FC	7	5	1	1	17	4	+13	27	
4	KCDRSC	7	2	2	3	11	8	+3	26	
5	Ling Yui Orion	7	3	1	3	14	11	+3	21	
6	St. Joseph's	7	3	2	2	12	10	+2	19	
7	Islands	7	1	3	3	13	14	−1	18	
8	Pak Hei (E)	7	1	2	4	5	12	−7	15	Elimination from league system

Source: Hong Kong Football Association
Rules for classification: 1) Points; 2) Head-to-head points; 3) Head-to-head goal difference; 4) Head-to-head goals scored; 5) Goal difference; 6) Goals scored; 7) Fair-play points; 8) Drawing lots
(E) Eliminated
