= Futsal at the 2025 Asian Youth Games =

2025 Asian Youth Games competition

- Venue: Khalifa Sports City Hall
- Dates: 23–30 October 2025

Futsal at the 2025 Asian Youth Games was held in Isa Town, Bahrain from 23 to 30 October 2025 at the Isa Sports City.

== Medalists ==
Event	Gold	Silver	Bronze
Boys	Afghanistan; Ahmad Esmaeili; Habibullah Sultani; Amir Hamza Qassemi; Sayed Abulfazl Najafi; Ali Ahmadi; Wasay Bahadur; Mohammad Akbari; Abbas Heydari; Hussain Hassani; Mohammad Zia Rezaie; Naeem Rahmat Zada	Iran; Mohammad Ali Shekarchi; Mohammad Amin Safaei; Saeid Fakhrani; Abolfazl Zamani; Sadra Choupani; Hossein Reza Yousefi; Amir Hossein Mostasharnejad; Amir Hossein Abdolrazzaghi; Ali Ahmadi; Mohammad Javad Norouzi; Mohammad Hossein Gharibi; Mohammad Arshia Atef; Amir Hossein Dahipour; Mohammad Matin Karami	Thailand; Jenson Jacobs; Nattapong Potikornpat; Wachirawit Manoonphol; Teerapat Wongkrit; Tanapob Sunet; Jirawat Sangsom; Narawit Srisuwan; Thawin Thanjue; Achita Srijuy; Boonyarit Petchtiam; Ratthawit Sriraksa; Thanakorn Sasongkram; Punno Wangsilpakhun; Thanawat Phuwipadawat
Girls	Iran; Elina Mansouri; Niayesh Rahmani; Nafiseh Mohammadi; Ghazal Rahmani; Sarina Zare; Tannaz Bagheri; Hadis Yari; Fatemeh Abbasi; Setayesh Rezaei; Narges Amirmohseni; Zahra Amini; Fatemeh Shokrani; Aynaz Yazdipour; Elnaz Hosseinipour	China; Fu Xinyue; Ren Yunuo; Xu Xinyi; Ding Kejia; Zhang Lubi; Peng Yaqi; Pan Ziya; Chang Mengying; Zhao Zitong; Tong Wenjing; Zhang Yamingli; Wang Meijia; Lian Yutong; Huang Zixi	Chinese Taipei; Su Yun-ting; Shen Bei-dun; Shen Wun-jia; Wang Ping-en; Hou Yu-xuan; Huang Hsueh-fen; Wu Chih-chin; Huang Yu-jhen; Liang Pin-wei; Ku Hsuan; Fan Rou-tung; Lin Yu-xuan; Hsu Jung-chia; Yu Zi-xin

== Medal table ==
Rank	Nation	Gold	Silver	Bronze	Total
1	Iran (IRI)	1	1	0	2
2	Afghanistan (AFG)	1	0	0	1
3	China (CHN)	0	1	0	1
4	Chinese Taipei (TPE)	0	0	1	1
4	Thailand (THA)	0	0	1	1
Totals (5 entries)		2	2	2	6

== Results ==
=== Boys ===
==== Preliminary ====
===== Group A =====
Pos	Team	Pld	W	D	L	GF	GA	GD	Pts
1	Afghanistan	3	3	0	0	21	3	+18	9
2	Uzbekistan	3	1	1	1	17	12	+5	4
3	China	3	1	1	1	9	6	+3	4
4	Bahrain	3	0	0	3	0	26	−26	0

Source: OCA
24 October
17:30

Afghanistan	10–2	Uzbekistan
Ahmadi 12'; Heydari 13', 23', 31'; Hassani 15'; Akbari 23', 32'; Bahadur 30'; Qassemi 35', 40'	Report	Aytbaev 25'; Ibragimov 30'

Khalifa Sports City Hall, Isa Town
Attendance: 37
Referee: Mohammad Javad Ehtesham (Iran)

24 October
20:00

Bahrain	0–6	China
	Report	Ouyang Qishi 5'; Mubarak 7' (o.g.); Sun Chenxi 9'; Sheng Li 19'; Yu Haoqian 29'; Liu Yufan 32'

Khalifa Sports City Hall, Isa Town
Attendance: 249
Referee: Ahmad Al-Daou (Lebanon)

25 October
17:30

China	2–2	Uzbekistan
Lu Haoyu 4'; Ouyang Qishi 22'	Report	Ilyosov 1', 27'

Khalifa Sports City Hall, Isa Town
Attendance: 85
Referee: Rawand Fattah (Iraq)

25 October
20:00

Bahrain	0–7	Afghanistan
	Report	Ahmadi 5', 30'; Sultani 11'; Najafi 12'; Hassani 27'; Rezaie 30'; Heydari 31'

Khalifa Sports City Hall, Isa Town
Attendance: 211
Referee: Yahya Al-Athwani (Saudi Arabia)

26 October
15:00

Afghanistan	4–1	China
Akbari 2', 31'; Rezaie 8', 19'	Report	Yu Haoqian 29'

Khalifa Sports City Hall, Isa Town
Attendance: 79
Referee: Sukhrob Sattorov (Tajikistan)

26 October
22:30

Bahrain	0–13	Uzbekistan
	Report	Ilyosov 1', 6', 35'; Ziyokhidinov 1', 16', 23'; Jaloliddinov 1'; Aytbaev 12', 13'; Kallibekov 13'; Mubarak 15' (o.g.); Gulomov 17', 34'

Khalifa Sports City Hall, Isa Town
Attendance: 98
Referee: Mohammad Javad Ehtesham (Iran)

===== Group B =====
Pos	Team	Pld	W	D	L	GF	GA	GD	Pts
1	Iran	3	2	1	0	22	4	+18	7
2	Thailand	3	2	1	0	19	7	+12	7
3	Saudi Arabia	3	1	0	2	3	26	−23	3
4	Kyrgyzstan	3	0	0	3	6	13	−7	0

Source: OCA
24 October
15:00

Thailand	11–0	Saudi Arabia
Srisuwan 2'; Sunet 4', 25'; Wangsilpakhun 14', 26', 38'; Sriraksa 18'; Petchtiam 27'; Wongkrit 33'; Sumayli 34' (o.g.); Sangsom 36'	Report

Khalifa Sports City Hall, Isa Town
Attendance: 157
Referee: Timur Ramazanow (Turkmenistan)

24 October
22:30

Iran	5–1	Kyrgyzstan
Choupani 1', 12'; Norouzi 16'; Abdolrazzaghi 17'; Ahmadi 40'	Report	Bekturov 21'

Khalifa Sports City Hall, Isa Town
Attendance: 63
Referee: Abdulrahman Al-Doseri (Bahrain)

25 October
15:00

Thailand	5–4	Kyrgyzstan
Srisuwan 14'; Wangsilpakhun 16'; Petchtiam 18', 26', 40'	Report	Koshbaev 14', 19'; Kanybekov 32', 40'

Khalifa Sports City Hall, Isa Town
Attendance: 89
Referee: Liu Jianqiao (China)

25 October
22:30

Iran	14–0	Saudi Arabia
Norouzi 2'; Yousefi 3', 11', 16', 21', 30', 38'; Zamani 12'; Ahmadi 14', 32'; Karami 19', 28'; Abdolrazzaghi 31'; Choupani 38'	Report

Khalifa Sports City Hall, Isa Town
Attendance: 37
Referee: Nikita Afinogenov (Uzbekistan)

26 October
17:30

Saudi Arabia	3–1	Kyrgyzstan
Al-Harthi 35'; Al-Aryani 37'; Kaabi 40'	Report	Zamirbekov 35'

Khalifa Sports City Hall, Isa Town
Attendance: 23
Referee: Elias Al-Hakim (Lebanon)

26 October
20:00

Thailand	3–3	Iran
Srisuwan 24', 27'; Abdolrazzaghi 36' (o.g.)	Report	Norouzi 2', 27'; Yousefi 9'

Khalifa Sports City Hall, Isa Town
Attendance: 241
Referee: Leung Chung Yin (Hong Kong)

==== Knockout round ====
Semifinals
28 October
Afghanistan	9
Thailand	1
28 October
Iran	14
Uzbekistan	2

Gold medal match
30 October
Afghanistan	2
Iran	1
Bronze medal match
30 October
Thailand	6
Uzbekistan	2

===== Semifinals =====
28 October
16:00

Iran	14–2	Uzbekistan
Choupani 2', 2', 7'; Norouzi 3', 7', 18'; Yousefi 13', 14'; Mostasharnejad 17'; Zamani 24'; Dahipour 25'; Fakhrani 27'; Gharibi 27'; Karami 30'	Report	Ilyosov 6'; Aytbaev 19'

Khalifa Sports City Hall, Isa Town
Attendance: 97
Referee: Abdulaziz Al-Sarraf (Kuwait)

28 October
19:00

Afghanistan	9–1	Thailand
Srisuwan 5' (o.g.); Akbari 7'; Heydari 8', 8'; Qassemi 13'; Bahadur 16'; Ahmadi 25', 37'; Rahmat Zada 40'	Report	Jacobs 1'

Khalifa Sports City Hall, Isa Town
Attendance: 197
Referee: Ahmed Al-Ghais (United Arab Emirates)

===== Bronze medal match =====
30 October
16:00

Thailand	6–2	Uzbekistan
Wangsilpakhun 16', 18', 25', 38'; Phuwipadawat 20'; Sriraksa 39'	Report	Abdulvosiev 18'; Ziyokhidinov 24'

Khalifa Sports City Hall, Isa Town
Attendance: 165
Referee: Abdulrahman Al-Doseri (Bahrain)

===== Gold medal match =====
30 October
19:00

Afghanistan	2–1	Iran
Heydari 17'; Ahmadi 21'	Report	Yousefi 23'

Khalifa Sports City Hall, Isa Town
Attendance: 331
Referee: Sukhrob Sattorov (Tajikistan)

=== Girls ===
==== Preliminary ====
Pos	Team	Pld	W	D	L	GF	GA	GD	Pts
1	China	4	2	2	0	24	5	+19	8
2	Iran	4	2	2	0	22	2	+20	8
3	Chinese Taipei	4	2	2	0	24	2	+22	8
4	Hong Kong	4	1	0	3	5	33	−28	3
5	Bahrain	4	0	0	4	3	36	−33	0

Source: OCA
23 October
15:00

China	1–1	Chinese Taipei
Peng Yaqi 5'	Report	Liang Pin-wei 3'

Khalifa Sports City Hall, Isa Town
Attendance: 55
Referee: Zari Fathi (Iran)

23 October
17:30

Hong Kong	0–6	Iran
	Report	Chan Kit Kwan 16' (o.g.); Yari 19'; Mohammadi 21'; N. Rahmani 26'; Zare 27'; Bagheri 36'

Khalifa Sports City Hall, Isa Town
Attendance: 78
Referee: Reem Al-Bishi (Saudi Arabia)

24 October
10:00

Hong Kong	1–10	China
Tsang Tsz Ching 18'	Report	Chang Mengying 10', 16'; Ding Kejia 11', 35'; Peng Yaqi 14'; Ren Yunuo 24'; Pan Ziya 27'; Lian Yutong 30'; Zhang Yamingli 36'; Zhao Zitong 39'

Khalifa Sports City Hall, Isa Town
Attendance: 30
Referee: Panadda Khotsenaphattra (Thailand)

24 October
12:30

Iran	14–0	Bahrain
Amirmohseni 2', 4', 34', 34'; Zare 9', 18'; N. Rahmani 14', 25', 32'; Rezaei 19'; Amini 20', 29'; Yazdipour 40', 40'	Report

Khalifa Sports City Hall, Isa Town
Attendance: 313
Referee: Liang Qingyun (China)

25 October
10:00

Chinese Taipei	0–0	Iran
	Report

Khalifa Sports City Hall, Isa Town
Attendance: 105
Referee: Maryam Al-Hadhrami (Oman)

25 October
12:30

Bahrain	2–3	Hong Kong
El-Marsafawy 17' (pen.); Al-Doseri 17'	Report	Tsang Tsz Ching 9', 16'; Hung 22'

Khalifa Sports City Hall, Isa Town
Attendance: 80
Referee: Zahra Rahimi (Iran)

26 October
10:00

Chinese Taipei	15–1	Hong Kong
Hsu Jung-chia 6', 8', 11', 33'; Wang Ping-en 9', 31', 40'; Hou Yu-xuan 12', 16', 36', 36'; Lin Yu-xuan 17', 35'; Fan Rou-tung 20'; Liang Pin-wei 30'	Report	Tsang Tsz Ching 40'

Khalifa Sports City Hall, Isa Town
Attendance: 23
Referee: Nour Chaito (Lebanon)

26 October
12:30

China	11–1	Bahrain
Chang Mengying 5'; Peng Yaqi 12', 19'; Ren Yunuo 15', 21'; Ding Kejia 16', 31'; Zhang Lubi 17', 30', 37'; Xu Xinyi 29'	Report	Miguéis 26'

Khalifa Sports City Hall, Isa Town
Attendance: 139
Referee: Najat Al-Blooshi (United Arab Emirates)

27 October
16:00

Iran	2–2	China
Amirmohseni 24', 40'	Report	Ding Kejia 12', 36'

Khalifa Sports City Hall, Isa Town
Attendance: 98
Referee: Maryam Al-Hadhrami (Oman)

27 October
18:30

Bahrain	0–8	Chinese Taipei
	Report	Hsu Jung-chia 3', 5', 13', 32'; Miguéis 11' (o.g.); Ku Hsuan 27', 31'; Fan Rou-tung 28'

Khalifa Sports City Hall, Isa Town
Attendance: 113
Referee: Zahra Rahimi (Iran)

==== Knockout round ====
Semifinals
28 October
China	9
Hong Kong	0
28 October
Iran (p)	2 (3)
Chinese Taipei	2 (1)

Gold medal match
29 October
China	0 (2)
Iran (p)	0 (3)
Bronze medal match
29 October
Hong Kong	1
Chinese Taipei	6

===== Semifinals =====
28 October
10:00

Iran	2–2	Chinese Taipei
Hosseinipour 6'; Amirmohseni 22'	Report	Hou Yu-xuan 12'; Ku Hsuan 12'
Penalties
Yari (penalty scored); Hosseinipour (penalty scored); Bagheri (penalty missed); Rezaei (penalty scored)	3–1	(penalty missed) Liang Pin-wei; (penalty missed) Huang Yu-jhen; (penalty scored) Hsu Jung-chia; (penalty missed) Lin Yu-xuan

Khalifa Sports City Hall, Isa Town
Attendance: 73
Referee: Kana Saito (Japan)

28 October
12:30

China	9–0	Hong Kong
Ren Yunuo 1'; Peng Yaqi 3', 26'; Zhang Lubi 9', 15'; Xu Xinyi 17'; Zhao Zitong 19'; Huang Zixi 36'; Wang Meijia 39'	Report

Khalifa Sports City Hall, Isa Town
Attendance: 88
Referee: Reem Al-Bishi (Saudi Arabia)

===== Bronze medal match =====
29 October
16:00

Hong Kong	1–6	Chinese Taipei
Chan Oi Ling 40'	Report	Hou Yu-xuan 9', 21'; Hsu Jung-chia 14'; Shen Wun-jia 32'; Ku Hsuan 34', 40'

Khalifa Sports City Hall, Isa Town
Attendance: 175
Referee: Gelareh Nazemi (Iran)

===== Gold medal match =====
29 October
19:00

China	0–0	Iran
	Report
Penalties
Zhang Lubi (penalty scored); Ren Yunuo (penalty missed); Chang Mengying (penalty scored); Lian Yutong (penalty missed); Tong Wenjing (penalty missed)	2–3	(penalty missed) Yari; (penalty missed) Hosseinipour; (penalty scored) Bagheri; (penalty scored) Amirmohseni; (penalty scored) Rezaei

Khalifa Sports City Hall, Isa Town
Attendance: 329
Referee: Mari Yamamoto (Japan)
