= 2024–25 Hong Kong Second Division League =

Hong Kong Second Division
- Season: 2024–25
- Champions: Tung Sing
- Promoted: Tung Sing; Supreme FC; Kwun Tong; Lucky Mile
- Relegated: Sun Hei; Sai Kung
- Matches played: 154
- Goals scored: 489 (3.18 per match)
- Top goalscorer: Kong Ping Lung (Tung Sing) (14 goals)
- Biggest home win: Tung Sing 6–0 Sun Hei (15 September 2024)
- Biggest away win: Wing Go 0–6 Supreme FC (8 December 2024); Fu Moon 0–6 Tung Sing (9 March 2025)
- Highest scoring: Kwong Wah 3–6 Yau Tsim Mong (8 September 2024)
- Longest winning run: 7 matches Supreme FC; Tung Sing
- Longest unbeaten run: 17 matches Tung Sing
- Longest winless run: 15 matches Sai Kung
- Longest losing run: 6 matches Yau Tsim Mong

The 2024–25 Hong Kong Second Division League was the 11th season of the Hong Kong Second Division since it became the third-tier football league in Hong Kong in 2014–15. The season began on 8 September 2024 and ended on 18 May 2025.

Newly introduced this season, the table was split into two groups: one championship group of eight teams and one relegation group of seven teams after a single round-robin had been played.

== Teams ==
=== Changes from last season ===
==== From Second Division ====
===== Promoted to First Division =====
- Wofoo Social Enterprises
- Tuen Mun

===== Relegated to Third Division =====
- Kowloon Cricket Club
- Wanchai

===== Withdrawn from Second Division =====
- CFCSSHK

==== To Second Division ====
===== Promoted from Third Division =====
- Supreme FC
- Tsuen Wan

===== Relegated from First Division =====
- Sai Kung
- Wong Tai Sin

== League table ==
Pos	Team	Pld	W	D	L	GF	GA	GD	Pts	Promotion or relegation
1	Tung Sing	14	11	3	0	30	10	+20	36	Qualification for the Championship round
2	Supreme FC	14	11	2	1	37	13	+24	35	Qualification for the Championship round
3	Fu Moon	14	9	2	3	31	21	+10	29	Qualification for the Championship round
4	Kwun Tong	14	8	3	3	24	10	+14	27	Qualification for the Championship round
5	Lucky Mile	14	8	2	4	27	17	+10	26	Qualification for the Championship round
6	Kwai Tsing	14	6	4	4	24	20	+4	22	Qualification for the Championship round
7	Yau Tsim Mong	14	6	2	6	27	17	+10	20	Qualification for the Championship round
8	Wong Tai Sin	14	5	4	5	16	19	−3	19	Qualification for the Championship round
9	Mutual	14	4	4	6	17	25	−8	16	Qualification for the Relegation round
10	Leaper	14	4	2	8	20	22	−2	14	Qualification for the Relegation round
11	Tsuen Wan	14	3	5	6	11	20	−9	14	Qualification for the Relegation round
12	Wing Go	14	4	1	9	16	30	−14	13	Qualification for the Relegation round
13	Kwong Wah	14	2	3	9	16	33	−17	9	Qualification for the Relegation round
14	Sun Hei	14	1	5	8	11	29	−18	8	Qualification for the Relegation round
15	Sai Kung	14	0	4	10	15	36	−21	4	Qualification for the Relegation round

Source: Hong Kong Football Association
Rules for classification: 1) Points; 2) Head-to-head points; 3) Head-to-head goal difference; 4) Head-to-head goals scored; 5) Goal difference; 6) Goals scored; 7) Fair-play points; 8) Drawing lots

== Championship round ==
Pos	Team	Pld	W	D	L	GF	GA	GD	Pts	Promotion or relegation
1	Tung Sing (C, P)	7	5	0	2	14	7	+7	51	Promotion to the First Division
2	Supreme FC (P)	7	5	0	2	12	5	+7	50	Promotion to the First Division
3	Kwun Tong (P)	7	4	2	1	9	6	+3	43	Promotion to the First Division
4	Lucky Mile (P)	7	4	1	2	15	10	+5	39	Promotion to the First Division
5	Kwai Tsing	7	3	0	4	10	10	0	31	
6	Fu Moon	7	0	1	6	5	26	−21	30	
7	Yau Tsim Mong	7	2	2	3	12	8	+4	28	
8	Wong Tai Sin	7	1	2	4	7	12	−5	24	

Source: Hong Kong Football Association
Rules for classification: 1) Points; 2) Head-to-head points; 3) Head-to-head goal difference; 4) Head-to-head goals scored; 5) Goal difference; 6) Goals scored; 7) Fair-play points; 8) Drawing lots
(C) Champions; (P) Promoted

== Relegation round ==
Pos	Team	Pld	W	D	L	GF	GA	GD	Pts	Promotion or relegation
1	Leaper	6	3	1	2	13	7	+6	24 (Note: Leaper win head-to-head against Wing Go)	
2	Wing Go (W)	6	3	2	1	17	12	+5	24	Withdrew from league system
3	Mutual	6	2	1	3	11	13	−2	23	
4	Kwong Wah	6	3	2	1	13	7	+6	20	
5	Tsuen Wan	6	1	2	3	11	20	−9	19	
6	Sun Hei (R)	6	2	2	2	7	7	0	16	Relegation to the Third Division
7	Sai Kung (R)	6	1	2	3	11	17	−6	9	Relegation to the Third Division

Source: Hong Kong Football Association
Rules for classification: 1) Points; 2) Head-to-head points; 3) Head-to-head goal difference; 4) Head-to-head goals scored; 5) Goal difference; 6) Goals scored; 7) Fair-play points; 8) Drawing lots
(R) Relegated; (W) ?
