= Kowloon City District SA =

Association football club based in Hong Kong

Kowloon City
- Full name: Kowloon City District Sports Association; Chinese: 九龍城區體育會
- Founded: 2002; 24 years ago
- Ground: Kai Tak Youth Sports Ground
- Capacity: 2,194
- Chairman: Andrew Mak
- Head coach: Fung Hoi Man
- League: Hong Kong Premier League
- 2025–26: Hong Kong Premier League, 6th of 10
Home colours	Away colours

Kowloon City District Sports Association (Chinese: 九龍城區體育會), currently known as Wofoo Kowloon City due to sponsorship reasons, is a Hong Kong professional football club which currently competes in the Hong Kong Premier League.

The club was founded in 2002 as a district team and played in the lower divisions for two decades before winning promotion to the top tier for the first time in 2024.

== History ==
=== 2002–2021: Foundation and amateur era ===
Kowloon City District Sports Association was established in 2002. The football team was formed as part of a widespread initiative by the Hong Kong Football Association to involve district councils in the local football league system. For the first two decades of its existence, the club functioned as an amateur team, primarily competing in the Hong Kong Third Division League. During this period, the club served mainly as a recreational outlet for local players and focused on community engagement rather than professional competition.

=== 2021–2024: The "EnGenius" era and rapid rise ===
A turning point came in the 2021–22 season when the club secured sponsorship from EnGenius and rebranded as EnGenius Kowloon City (Chinese: 駿英九龍城). The injection of resources allowed the club to recruit experienced former professional players. In the 2021–22 Hong Kong Second Division League, the team sat at the top of the table before the season was prematurely cancelled due to the COVID-19 pandemic.

Recognizing their ambition and performance, the HKFA accepted Kowloon City's application for promotion to the Hong Kong First Division League for the 2022–23 season. In their debut season in the second tier, they finished as runners-up, narrowly missing out on the title. The following season (2023–24), Kowloon City dominated the First Division, clinching the championship and earning a historic promotion to the Hong Kong Premier League.

=== 2024–Present: Professionalisation ===
The 2024–25 season marked Kowloon City's debut in the top flight of Hong Kong football. The club transitioned to a professional setup, removing the "EnGenius" sponsor name from the club title to return to its roots as Kowloon City. They made significant signings, bringing in foreign talents from Brazil and South Korea, as well as experienced local players to compete at the highest level.

== Stadium ==
Since their promotion to the Hong Kong Premier League in 2024, Kowloon City has utilised the Sham Shui Po Sports Ground as their home venue. Although the stadium is geographically located in the Sham Shui Po District rather than Kowloon City, it serves as a suitable venue due to the lack of Premier League-standard facilities within the Kowloon City district itself.

- Capacity: 2,194
- Surface: Natural Grass
- Opened: 1988

Since 2026–27 season, the club returned to Kowloon City District as they relcocated to Kai Tak Youth Sports Ground.

== Name history ==
- 2002–2021: Kowloon City (九龍城)
- 2021–2024: EnGenius Kowloon City (駿英九龍城)
- 2024–2026: Kowloon City (九龍城)
- 2026–present: Wofoo Kowloon City (和富九龍城)

== Club officials ==
Position	Staff
Director	(Hong Kong) Ho Shun Yin
Head coach	(Hong Kong) Fung Hoi Man
Assistant coaches	(Hong Kong) Hui Ka Lok
Assistant coaches	(Hong Kong) Lo Yip Tat
Assistant coaches	(Hong Kong) Yau Tsz Yeung
Assistant coaches	(Hong Kong) Tsang Kam To
Goalkeeping coach	(Hong Kong) Tong Ka Ming
Technical analyst	(Hong Kong) Ng Tsz Wai
Advisor	(Hong Kong) Chan Ming Kong

== Current squad ==
=== First team ===
As of 3 October 2026

Note: Flags indicate national team as defined under FIFA eligibility rules; some limited exceptions apply. Players may hold more than one non-FIFA nationality.

No.	Pos.	Nation	Player
1	GK	HKG	Cheung Kwai Wa
2	DF	HKG	Yu Pui Hong
3	MF	PHI	Gavin Muens
4	DF	KOR	Kang Jun-hyeon
5	MF	HKG	Diego Eli
6	MF	BRA	Kessi
7	MF	BRA	Mikael
8	MF	HKG	Chiu Wan Chun
9	FW	SRB	Nikola Popović
10	FW	BRA	Riquelme
11	FW	HKG	Chen Ngo Hin (on loan from Kitchee)
12	MF	HKG	Law Cheuk Hei (on loan from Lee Man)
14	MF	KOR	Kim Min-sub
17	DF	HKG	Kwok Chun Nok
18	FW	HKG	Matthew Slattery
19	MF	USA	Jason Liang

No.	Pos.	Nation	Player
20	DF	HKG	Yim Kai Cheuk
21	DF	HKG	Tsang Kam To (captain)
22	GK	HKG	Kwong Tin Lok
23	MF	HKG	Ho Lung Ho
24	DF	VEN	Sixto Lucena
25	FW	HKG	Hui Ka Lok
31	DF	HKG	Wong Hiu Laam
37	MF	HKG	Lin Long Tik
47	FW	AUS	Adolph Koudakpo
66	GK	HKG	Leung Hiu Yeung
90	DF	BRA	João Souza
91	DF	HKG	Wong Lok Yat
95	MF	HKG	Fung Tin Wing
99	GK	HKG	Wong Yat Chun
—	DF	MAC	Cláudio David
—	FW	HKG	Wong Tsz Kit

=== Out on loan ===
Note: Flags indicate national team as defined under FIFA eligibility rules; some limited exceptions apply. Players may hold more than one non-FIFA nationality.

No.	Pos.	Nation	Player
—	DF	KOR	Shin Seop-yun (at Hoi King until 31 May 2027)

== Managerial history ==
Name	Nat	Period
Lau Tung Ping	(Hong Kong)	2019–2022
Yan Lik Kin	(Hong Kong)	2022–2023
Tai Sze Chung	(Hong Kong)	2023–2024
Chan Ming Kong	(Hong Kong)	2024–2025
Yau Tsz Yeung	(Hong Kong)	2025
Chan Ming Kong	(Hong Kong)	2025
Fung Hoi Man	(Hong Kong)	2025–Present

== Season-to-season record ==
Season	Tier	Division	Teams	Pos.	Home Stadium	Att./G	FA Cup	Senior Shield	League Cup	Sapling Cup
2002–03	3	Third District	13				Did not enter			
2003–04	3	Third District					Did not enter			
2004–05	3	Third District					Did not enter			
2005–06	3	Third District	16	11			Did not enter			
2006–07	3	Third District	17	10			Did not enter			
2007–08	3	Third District	16	12			Did not enter			
2008–09	3	Third District	15	11			Did not enter			
2009–10	3	Third District	14	9			Did not enter			
2010–11	3	Third District	11	6			Did not enter			
2011–12	3	Third District	8	4			Did not enter			
2012–13	3	Third Division	14	11			Did not enter			
2013–14	3	Third Division	14	11			Did not enter			
2014–15	3	Second Division	12	3			Did not enter			
2015–16	3	Second Division	12	8			Did not enter			
2016–17	3	Second Division	12	5			Did not enter			
2017–18	3	Second Division	14	7			Did not enter			
2018–19	3	Second Division	14	11			Did not enter			
2019–20	3	Second Division	14	Cancelled			Did not enter			
2020–21	3	Second Division	14	10			Did not enter			
2021–22	3	Second Division	13	Cancelled			Did not enter			
2022–23	2	First Division	14	2			Did not enter			
2023–24	2	First Division	12	1			Did not enter			
2024–25	1	Premier League	9	6	Sham Shui Po Sports Ground	536	Quarter-finals	First round	Not held	Group Stage
2025–26	1	Premier League	10	6	Sham Shui Po Sports Ground	519	First round	Quarter-finals	Semi-finals	Defunct
2026–27	1	Premier League	11		Sham Shui Po Sports Ground				Redemption first round	Defunct

Note:

1st or Champions 2nd or Runners-up 3rd place Promotion Relegation

== Honours ==
=== League ===
- Hong Kong First Division
  - Champions (1): 2023–24
