= 2013–14 Hong Kong Rangers FC season =

Biu Chun Rangers
2013–14 season
- Chairman: Mok Yiu Keung
- Head Coach: José Ricardo Rambo
- Home Ground: Sham Shui Po Sports Ground (Capacity: 2,194)
- First Division: 5th
- Senior Shield: Quarter-finals
- FA Cup: TBD
- Highest home attendance: 690 (27 October vs. Eastern Salon, First Division)
- Lowest home attendance: 245 (29 September vs. Tuen Mun, First Division)
- Average home league attendance: 441 (in all competition)
Home colours	Away colours

The 2013–14 season is Biu Chun Rangers's 35th, as well as 2nd consecutive, season in the Hong Kong First Division League. Biu Chun Rangers will compete in the First Division League, Senior Challenge Shield and FA Cup.

== Key events ==
- 18 May 2013: The club confirmed that Hong Kong forward Lam Hok Hei joins Indonesian Super League club Persija Jakarta on a 4-month loan transfer until 31 August 2013.
- 26 May 2013: Brazilian striker Giovane Alves da Silva joins newly promoted side Eastern Salon on a free transfer.
- 29 May 2013: Hong Kong midfielder Chow Cheuk Fung joins the club from Tuen Mun on a free transfer.
- 30 May 2013: Hong Kong midfielder Cheng King Ho leaves the club and joins newly promoted side Yuen Long on a free transfer.
- 30 May 2013: Club director Philip Lee confirms the departure of Wong Chin Hung, Chan Siu Yuen and Lau Nim Yat.
- 2 June 2013: Hong Kong midfielder Lau Nim Yat leaves the club and joins newly promoted side Eastern Salon on a free transfer.
- 2 June 2013: Hong Kong defender Chan Siu Yuen leaves the club and joins fellow First Division side Citizen on a free transfer.
- 8 June 2013: Hong Kong defender Chan Cham Hei joins the club from First Division club South China on a free transfer after his contract with South China expiries and is released by them.
- 8 June 2013: Hong Kong defender Lai Ka Fai makes a return to First Division football as he joins the club from Fourth Division club Mutual on a free transfer.
- 8 June 2013: Cameroon-born Hong Kong striker Julius Akosah leaves the club and join newly promoted First Division club Happy Valley for an undisclosed fee.
- 8 June 2013: Cameroon-born Hong Kong midfielder Wilfred Bamnjo leaves the club and joins newly promoted First Division club Happy Valley for an undisclosed fee.
- 11 June 2013: Hong Kong defender Wong Chin Hung leaves the club and joins newly promoted First Division club Eastern Salon on a free transfer.
- 20 June 2013: Hong Kong goalkeeper Wong Tsz Him leaves the club and joins fellow First Division club Sunray Cave JC Sun Hei for an undisclosed fee.
- 6 July 2013: The club appoints José Ricardo Rambo as the head coach of the club in the following season.
- 14 July 2013: Ghana-born naturalised Hong Kong defender Moses Mensah joins the club from fellow First Division club Citizen on a free transfer.
- 14 July 2013: Youth team players Marco Wegener, Cheung Siu Kwan, Man Wai Sum, Ho Chik Hin and Ng Clinton are promoted to the first team in the following season.
- 20 July 2013: Brazilian midfielder Rian Marques joins the club from Finland third-tier division Kakkonen club Oulun Rotuaarin Pallo for an undisclosed fee.
- 1 January 2014: Hong Kong midfielder Li Ka Chun leaves the club and joins fellow First Division club Biu Chun Rangers for an undisclosed fee.

== Players ==
=== Squad information ===
N	P	Nat.	Name	Date of birth	Age	Since	Previous club	Notes
1	GK	(Hong Kong)	Leung Hing Kit^{LP}	22 October 1989	24	2007	Hong Kong 08	Team 1st vice captain
2	DF	(Hong Kong)	Lai Hau Hei^{LP}	19 January 1995	19	2012	Youth system	
8	MF	(Croatia)	Miroslav Saric^{FP}	7 February 1986	28	2012	(Croatia) NK Lučko	
10	FW	(Hong Kong)	Lam Hok Hei^{NR}	18 September 1991	22	2006	Youth system	On loan to Persija Jakarta
11	DF	(Hong Kong)	Shum Wai Shing^{LP}	28 February 1993	21	2012	(Hong Kong) Sham Shui Po	
18	DF	(Brazil)	Luciano Silva da Silva^{LP}	13 June 1987	26	2013 (Winter)	(Vietnam) An Giang	
19	MF	(Hong Kong)	Law Hiu Chung^{LP}	10 June 1995	18	2010	Youth system	
20	MF	(Hong Kong)	Wong Philip^{LP}	20 January 1996	18	2011	Youth system	
23	DF	(Hong Kong)	Liu Songwei^{LP}	8 October 1989	24	2009	(Hong Kong) South China	Second nationality: China
24	MF	(Hong Kong)	Yuen Kin Man^{LP}	19 January 1989	25	2012	(Hong Kong) Happy Valley	
	MF	(Hong Kong)	Chow Cheuk Fung^{LP}	1 August 1989	24	2013	(Hong Kong) Tuen Mun	On loan from Tuen Mun
	DF	(Hong Kong)	Chan Cham Hei^{LP}	17 June 1991	22	2013	(Hong Kong) South China	
	DF	(Hong Kong)	Lai Ka Fai^{LP}	30 May 1983	31	2013	(Hong Kong) Mutual	
	DF	(Ghana)	Moses Mensah^{LP}	10 August 1978	35	2013	(Hong Kong) Citizen	Second nationality: Hong Kong
	FW	(Hong Kong)	Marco Wegener^{LP}	15 August 1995	18	2013	Youth system	Second nationality: Germany
	MF	(Hong Kong)	Cheng Siu Kwan^{LP}	13 January 1997	17	2013	Youth system	
	GK	(Hong Kong)	Man Wai Sum^{LP}	12 March 1997	17	2013	Youth system	
	MF	(Hong Kong)	Ho Chik Hin^{LP}	22 January 1998	16	2013	Youth system	
	FW	(Hong Kong)	Ng Clinton^{LP}	1 February 1997	17	2013	Youth system	
	MF	(Brazil)	Rian Marques^{FP}	28 August 1982	31	2013	(Finland) Oulun Rotuaarin Pallo	Left in September 2013

As of 1 January 2014

Source: Biu Chun Rangers
Ordered by squad number.

^{LP}Local player; ^{FP}Foreign player; ^{NR}Non-registered player

=== Transfers ===
==== In ====
#	Position	Player	Transferred from	Fee	Date	Team	Source
	DF	(Hong Kong) Chan Cham Hei	(Hong Kong) South China	Free transfer	8 June 2013	First team	
	DF	(Hong Kong) Lai Ka Fai	(Hong Kong) Mutual	Free transfer	8 June 2013	First team	
	DF	(Ghana) Moses Mensah	(Hong Kong) Citizen	Free transfer	14 July 2013	First team	
	FW	(Hong Kong) Marco Wegener	Youth team	N/A	14 July 2013	First team	
	MF	(Hong Kong) Cheng Siu Kwan	Youth team	N/A	14 July 2013	First team	
	GK	(Hong Kong) Man Wai Sum	Youth team	N/A	14 July 2013	First team	
	MF	(Hong Kong) Ho Chik Hin	Youth team	N/A	14 July 2013	First team	
	FW	(Hong Kong) Ng Clinton	Youth team	N/A	14 July 2013	First team	
	MF	(Brazil) Rian Marques	(Finland) Oulun Rotuaarin Pallo	Undisclosed	20 July 2013	First team	

==== Out ====
#	Position	Player	Transferred to	Fee	Date	Team	Source
22	FW	(Brazil) Giovane Alves da Silva	(Hong Kong) Eastern Salon	Free transfer (Released)	26 May 2013	First team	
7	MF	(Hong Kong) Cheng King Ho	(Hong Kong) I- Sky Yuen Long	Free transfer (Released)	30 May 2013	First team	
25	DF	(Brazil) Juninho	Unattached	Free transfer (End of Contract)	30 May 2013	First team	
4	DF	(Zambia) Sashi Chalwe	Unattached	Free transfer (End of Contract)	30 May 2013	First team	
6	MF	(Hong Kong) Lau Nim Yat	(Hong Kong) Eastern Salon	Free transfer (Released)	2 June 2013	First team	
14	DF	(Hong Kong) Chan Siu Yuen	(Hong Kong) Citizen	Free transfer (Released)	2 June 2013	First team	
21	FW	(Hong Kong) Julius Akosah	(Hong Kong) Happy Valley	Undisclosed	8 June 2013	First team	
5	MF	(Cameroon) Wilfred Bamnjo	(Hong Kong) Happy Valley	Undisclosed	8 June 2013	First team	
3	DF	(Hong Kong) Wong Chin Hung	(Hong Kong) Eastern Salon	Free transfer (Released)	11 June 2013	First team	
17	GK	(Hong Kong) Wong Tsz Him	(Hong Kong) Sunray Cave JC Sun Hei	Undisclosed	20 June 2013	First team	
	DF	(Hong Kong) Chan Chem Hei	Unattached	Free transfer (Released)	October 2013	First team	

==== Loan In ====
#	Position	Player	Loaned from	Date	Loan expires	Team	Source
8	MF	(Hong Kong) Chow Cheuk Fung	(Hong Kong) Tuen Mun	29 May 2013	End of the season	First team	

==== Loan out ====
#	Position	Player	Loaned to	Date	Loan expires	Team	Source
10	FW	(Hong Kong) Lam Hok Hei	(Indonesia) Persija Jakarta	18 May 2013	31 August 2013	First team	

== Club ==
=== Coaching staff ===
Position	Staff
Head Coach	(Brazil) José Ricardo Rambo
Assistant Coach	(Hong Kong) Chan Hung Ping
Assistant Coach	(Hong Kong) Law Kwok Ho

Last updated: 16 July 2012
Source: Biu Chu Rangers

== Squad statistics ==
=== Overall Stats ===
	First Division	Senior Shield	FA Cup	Total Stats
Games played	9	2	0	11
Games won	2	1	0	3
Games drawn	5	0	0	5
Games lost	2	1	0	3
Goals for	10	3	0	13
Goals against	11	4	0	15
Players used	22	15	0	22^{1}
Yellow cards	24	4	0	28
Red cards	1	0	0	1

Last updated: 15 December 2013
Source: Player Stats

Players Used: Biu Chun Rangers has used a total of 22 different players in all competitions.

=== Squad Stats ===
				Total				Hong Kong First Division League		Senior Challenge Shield		FA Cup		
N	Pos.	Name	Nat.	GS	App	Gls	Min	App	Gls	App	Gls	App	Gls	Notes
1	GK	Leung Hing Kit	(Hong Kong)	8	8	-11	676	8	-11					(−) GA
19	GK	Li Jian	(Hong Kong)	3	4	-4	314	2		2	-4			(−) GA; Second nationality: China
2	DF	Lai Man Fai	(Hong Kong)	1	4		141	3		1				
3	DF	Shum Wai Shing	(Hong Kong)											
4	DF	Lai Hau Hei	(Hong Kong)		2		11	1		1				
5	DF	Moses Mensah	(Cameroon)	11	11	1	990	9	1	2				Second nationality: Hong Kong
18	DF	Chan Chem Hei	(Hong Kong)		5		50	5						
22	DF	Tomas Maronesi	(Brazil)	11	11		990	9		2				
23	DF	Liu Songwei	(Hong Kong)	6	7		518	6		1				Second nationality: China
33	DF	Luciano	(Brazil)	11	11	1	990	9	1	2				
	DF	Ivan Razumović	(Croatia)	1	1		17	1						Left the club in September 2013
6	MF	Chow Cheuk Fung	(Hong Kong)	9	10		674	8		2				On loan from Tuen Mun
7	MF	Chuck Yiu Kwok	(Hong Kong)	9	11	3	832	9	3	2				
8	MF	Miroslav Saric	(Croatia)	6	7	1	584	6	1	1				
12	MF	Li Ka Chun	(Hong Kong)											
16	MF	Yick Chi Ho	(Hong Kong)		1		22	1						
17	MF	Chan Ming Kong	(Hong Kong)	7	10		608	8		2				
21	MF	Law Hiu Chung	(Hong Kong)	6	9		523	8		1				
	MF	Rian Marques	(Brazil)	2	2	1	160	2	1					Left the club in September 2013
9	FW	Li Jian	(China)	4	8		436	8						Second nationality: Hong Kong
10	FW	Lam Hok Hei	(Hong Kong)	10	11	2	874	9	1	2	1			
14	FW	Marco Wegener	(Hong Kong)											Second nationality: Germany
28	FW	Tales Schutz	(Brazil)	7	7	3	626	5	2	2	1			
	FW	Daniel	(Brazil)	2	2		180	2						Left the club in September 2013
	FW	Lee Kil-Hoon	(South Korea)	7	7	1	630	5		2	1			Left the club in December 2013

Last updated: 15 December 2013
Ordered by Position
0 shown as blank

=== Top scorers ===
Place	Position	Nationality	Number	Name	First Division	Senior Shield	FA Cup	Total
1	MF	(Hong Kong)	7	Chuck Yiu Kwok	3	0	0	3
1	FW	(Brazil)	28	Tales Schutz	2	1	0	3
3	FW	(Hong Kong)	10	Lam Hok Hei	1	1	0	2
4	DF	(Cameroon) (Hong Kong)	5	Moses Mensah	1	0	0	1
4	MF	(Croatia)	8	Miroslav Saric	1	0	0	1
4	DF	(Brazil)	33	Luciano	1	0	0	1
4	FW	(South Korea)		Lee Kil-Hoon	0	1	0	1
4	MF	(Brazil)		Rian Marques	1	0	0	1
TOTALS					10	3	0	13

=== Disciplinary record ===
Includes all competitive matches. Players listed below made at least one appearance for South China first squad during the season.

N	P	Nat.	Name	League			Shield			FA Cup			Total			Notes
N	P	Nat.	Name	Yellow card	Second yellow card	Red card	Yellow card	Second yellow card	Red card	Yellow card	Second yellow card	Red card	Yellow card	Second yellow card	Red card	Notes
1	GK	(Hong Kong)	Leung Hing Kit	2									2			
2	DF	(Hong Kong)	Lai Ka Fai				1						1			
5	DF	(Cameroon) (Hong Kong)	Moses Mensah	2									2			
6	MF	(Hong Kong)	Chow Cheuk Fung	1									1			
7	MF	(Hong Kong)	Chuck Yiu Kwok	1									1			
8	MF	(Croatia)	Miroslav Saric	3									3			
17	MF	(Hong Kong)	Chan Ming Kong	5									5			
21	DF	(Hong Kong)	Law Hiu Chung	3									3			
22	DF	(Hong Kong)	Tomas Maronesi	1			1						2			
23	DF	(Hong Kong) (China)	Liu Songwei	2									2			
28	FW	(Brazil)	Tales Schutz	1	1		1						2	1		
	FW	(South Korea)	Lee Kil-Hoon	1			1						2			
	FW	(Brazil)	Daniel Goulart Quevedo	1									1			
	DF	(Croatia)	Ivan Razumovic	1									1			

Last updated: 15 December 2013
Source: Competitive matches
Ordered by (red card) , (second yellow card) and (yellow card)
(yellow card) = Number of bookings; (second yellow card) = Number of sending offs after a second yellow card; (red card) = Number of sending offs by a direct red card.

=== Substitution record ===
Includes all competitive matches.

			League		Shield		FA Cup		Total	
No.	Pos	Name	subson	subsoff	subson	subsoff	subson	subsoff	subson	subsoff
Goalkeepers
1	GK	Leung Hing Kit	0	1	0	0	0	0	0	1
19	GK	Li Jian	1	1	0	0	0	0	1	1
Defenders
2	RB	Lai Ka Fai	2	0	1	1	0	0	3	1
3	DF	Shum Wai Shing	0	0	0	0	0	0	0	0
4	DF	Lai Hau Hei	1	0	1	0	0	0	2	0
5	DF	Moses Mensah	0	0	0	0	0	0	0	0
18	LB	Chan Chem Hei	5	0	0	0	0	0	5	0
21	RB	Law Hiu Chung	3	2	1	0	0	0	4	2
22	CB	Tomas Maronesi	0	0	0	0	0	0	0	0
23	CB	Liu Songwei	1	1	0	1	0	0	1	2
33	CB	Luciano	0	0	0	0	0	0	0	0
	CB	Ivan Razumovic	0	1	0	0	0	0	0	1
Midfielders
6	CM	Chow Cheuk Fung	0	5	1	1	0	0	1	6
7	RM	Chuck Yiu Kwok	2	3	0	1	0	0	2	4
8	CM	Miroslav Saric	1	1	1	0	0	0	2	1
12	CM	Li Ka Chun	0	0	0	0	0	0	0	0
16	DM	Yick Chi Ho	1	0	0	0	0	0	1	0
17	CM	Chan Ming Kong	3	4	0	1	0	0	3	5
	AM	Rian Marques	0	1	0	0	0	0	0	1
Forwards
9	LW	Li Jian	4	2	1	0	0	0	5	2
10	SS	Lam Hok Hei	1	3	0	1	0	0	1	4
14	SS	Marco Wegener	0	0	0	0	0	0	0	0
28	SS	Tales SChutz	0	0	0	0	0	0	0	0
	CF	Daniel	0	0	0	0	0	0	0	0
	SS	Lee Kil-Hoon	0	0	0	0	0	0	0	0

Last updated: 15 December 2013

=== Captains ===
No.	P	Name	Country	No. games	Notes
1	GK	Leung Hing Kit	(Hong Kong)	7	Captain
28	FW	Tales Schutz	(Brazil)	2	2nd vice captain
2	DF	Lai Ka Fai	(Hong Kong)	1	1st vice captain
23	DF	Liu Songwei	(Hong Kong)	1	

Last updated: 15 December 2013
Source: Competitive match reports.
Competitive matches only
Matches started as captain only
Country: FIFA nationality; No.: Squad number; P: Position; Name: Player name; No. Games: Number of games started as captain.

== Competitions ==
=== Overall ===
Competition	Started round	Current position / round	Final position / round	First match	Last match
Hong Kong First Division League	—	1st		31 August 2013	
Senior Challenge Shield	Quarter-finals	—		October 2013	
FA Cup	Quarter-finals	—		January 2014	

Updated to match played 13 August 2013
Source: Competitions

=== First Division League ===
==== Classification ====
Pos	Team	Pld	W	D	L	GF	GA	GD	Pts	Qualification or relegation
3	South China	18	8	8	2	35	24	+11	32	2015 AFC Cup (Note: South China won the 2013–14 Hong Kong season play-off and thus qualified for the 2015 AFC Cup group stage.)
4	Royal Southern (R)	18	5	6	7	25	32	−7	21	2013–14 Hong Kong season play-off and relegation to 2014–15 Hong Kong First Division League (Note: Since the 2013–14 Hong Kong Senior Challenge Shield winners (South China) would at this point qualify for the 2013–14 Hong Kong season play-off, the 4th placed team would qualify for the Season Play-off. At the same time, Royal Southern declined to participate in the 2014–15 Hong Kong Premier League and would self-relegate in the following season.)
5	Hong Kong Rangers	18	5	6	7	23	32	−9	21	
6	Eastern Salon	18	5	6	7	34	37	−3	21	2013–14 Hong Kong season play-off (Note: Eastern Salon qualified for the 2013–14 Hong Kong season play-off as winners of the 2013–14 Hong Kong FA Cup.)
7	I-Sky Yuen Long	18	5	5	8	25	33	−8	20	

Updated to match(es) played on 11 May 2014. Source: Hong Kong Football Association
Rules for classification: 1) points; 2) head-to-head points; 3) head-to-head goal difference; 4) head-to-head goals scored; 5) goal difference; 6) number of goals scored.
(R) Relegated

==== Results summary ====
Overall								Home						Away					
Pld	W	D	L	GF	GA	GD	Pts	W	D	L	GF	GA	GD	W	D	L	GF	GA	GD
9	2	5	2	10	11	−1	11	1	4	0	6	5	+1	1	1	2	4	6	−2

Last updated: 15 December 2013.
Source: First Division

==== Results by round ====
Round	1	2	3	4	6	7	10	8	9	5	11	12	13	14	15	16	17	18	19	20	21	22
Ground	A	H	H	H	A	H	H	A	A	A	H	A	A	A	H	A	H	H	H	A	H	A
Result	D	W	D	D	P	D	D	L	L	W												
Position	5	3	3	4	4	7	7	9	9	7												

Updated to match(es) played on 15 December 2013. Source: Competitive matches
A = Away; H = Home; W = Win; D = Draw; L = Loss; P = Postponed; V = Voided

== Matches ==
Win Draw Loss Void

=== Pre-season friendlies ===
26 July 2013	Tuen Mun (Hong Kong)	4 – 1	(Hong Kong) Biu Chun Rangers	Hong Kong

1 August 2013	Meixian Hakka (China)	–	(Hong Kong) Biu Chun Rangers	Guangzhou, China PR
				Stadium: Guangdong Olympic Stadium

2 August 2013	Meixian Hakka (China)	–	(Hong Kong) Biu Chun Rangers	Guangzhou, China PR
				Stadium: Guangdong Olympic Stadium

=== First Division League ===
31 August 2013 Round 1	I-Sky Yuen Long	2 – 2	Biu Chun Rangers	Yuen Long, New Territories
14:30 UTC+8	Souza 31', 57'; Cheng King Ho (yellow card) 16'; Fabio Lopes (yellow card) 19' (red card) 20'	Report	3' Marques; 32' Chuck Yiu Kwok; (yellow card) 54' Chow Cheuk Fung; (yellow card) 71' Chan Ming Kong	Stadium: Yuen Long Stadium (Capacity: 4,932); Attendance: 1,053; Referee: Ho Wai Sing; Assistant referees: Chow Chun Kit, Lau Fong Hei; Fourth official: Chan Ming Siu

15 September 2013 Round 2	Biu Chun Rangers	3 – 2	Yokohama FC Hong Kong	Sham Shui Po, Mong Kok
14:30 UTC+8	Lam Hok Hei 13' (pen.); Moses 42' (yellow card) 90+3'; Daniel (yellow card) 57'; Tomas (yellow card) 67'; Chan Ming Kong (yellow card) 85'; Miroslav 90' (pen.)	Report	(yellow card) 12' Murai; 34', 90+1' Fukuda; (yellow card) 40' Chan Chun Lok; (yellow card) 53' Yoshitake; (yellow card) 56' Leung Kwun Chung	Stadium: Sham Shui Po Sports Ground (Capacity: 2,194); Attendance: 457; Referee: Liu Kwok Man; Assistant referees: Tong Kui Sum, Sarao Amarjit Singh; Fourth official: Yau Tsz Yeung

21 September 2013 Round 3	Biu Chun Rangers	1 – 1	Sunray Cave JC Sun Hei	Sham Shui Po, Mong Kok
14:30 UTC+8	Razumovic (yellow card) 2'; Law Hiu Chung (yellow card) 45+1'; Chuck Yiu Kwok 71'	Report	12' (yellow card) 45+4' Kot Cho Wai; (yellow card) 29' Kilama	Stadium: Sham Shui Po Sports Ground (Capacity: 2,194); Attendance: 250; Referee: Chan Shui Hung

29 September 2013 Round 4	Biu Chun Rangers	1 − 1 (Voided)	Tuen Mun	Sham Shui Po, Mong Kok
14:30 UTC+8	Luciano 14'; Chan Ming Kong (yellow card) 45+3'; Liu Songwei (yellow card) 46'	Report	40' Sanchez	Stadium: Sham Shui Po Sports Ground (Capacity: 2,194); Attendance: 245; Referee: Tong Kui Sum; Assistant referees: Chan Shui Hung, Lam Nai Kei` Fourth official: Tang Hing Fu

6 October 2013 Round 5	Kitchee	P – P	Biu Chun Rangers	Mong Kok, Mong Kok
14:30 UTC+8				Stadium: Mong Kok Stadium (Capacity: 6,680)

20 October 2013 Round 6	Biu Chun Rangers	0 – 0	Sun Pegasus	Sham Shui Po, Mong Kok
14:30 UTC+8	Chan Ming Kong (yellow card) 44'; Chuck Yiu Kwok (yellow card) 81'	Report	(yellow card) 65' Ranđelović; (yellow card) 70' (yellow-red card) 76' Landon Ling; (yellow card) 79' Raščić	Stadium: Sham Shui Po Sports Ground (Capacity: 2,194); Attendance: 566; Referee: Ho Wai Sing; Assistant referees: Yau Ho Fai, Fok Pong Sing; Fourth official: Liu Kwok Man

27 October 2013 Round 7	Biu Chun Rangers	1 – 1	Eastern Salon	Sham Shui Po, Mong Kok
14:30 UTC+8	Schutz 2' (yellow card) 3'; Liu Songwei (yellow card) 40'; Miroslav (yellow card) 56'; Moses (yellow card) 80'; Leung Hin Kit (yellow card) 84'	Report	(yellow card) 24' Clayton; (yellow card) 37' Itaparica; 90' Leung Kwok Wai; (yellow card) 90+2' Leung Chi Wing	Stadium: Sham Shui Po Sports Ground (Capacity: 2,194); Attendance: 690; Referee: Tong Kui Sum; Assistant referees: Chow Chun Kit, Chan Ming Siu; Fourth official: Sarao Amarjit Singh

23 November 2013 Round 10	Royal Southern	2 – 1	Biu Chun Rangers	Aberdeen, Hong Kong Island
14:30 UTC+8	Dieguito 24'; Li Ngai Hoi (yellow card) 33'; Ip Chung Long (yellow card) 63'; Chow Ka Wa 70'	Report	(yellow card) 11' Miroslav; 56' Schutz; (yellow card) 63' Chan Ming Kong	Stadium: Aberdeen Sports Ground (Capacity: 4,000); Attendance: 319; Referee: Ho Wai Sing; Assistant referees: Luk Kin Sun, Yu Kin Fung; Fourth official: Chan Ming Siu

1 December 2013 Round 8	South China	2 – 0	Biu Chun Rangers	So Kon Po, Hong Kong Island
17:30 UTC+8	Ko Kyung-Joon 30'; Dhiego 34' (yellow card) 83'; Barry (yellow card) 40'; Lee Hong Lim (yellow card) 72'	Report	(yellow card) 31' Leung Hing Kit; (yellow card) 70' Lee Kil-Hoon	Stadium: Hong Kong Stadium (Capacity: 40,000); Attendance: 1,112; Referee: Cheng Oi Cho; Assistant referees: Yu Chun Sun, Yu Kin Fung; Fourth official: Lui Siu Chuen

15 December 2013 Round 9	Citizen	0 – 1	Biu Chun Rangers	Tsing Yi, New Territories
14:30 UTC+8	Wong Yiu Fu (yellow card) 45'; Festus (yellow card) 51'	Report	(yellow card) 30' (yellow-red card) 86' Schutz; (yellow card) 43' Miroslav; (yellow card) 70' Law Hiu Chung; 73' Chuck Yiu Kwok	Stadium: Tsing Yi Sports Ground (Capacity: 1,500); Attendance: 218; Referee: Ng Kai Lam; Assistant referees: Yau Ho Fai, Fok Pong Shing; Fourth official: Chan Shui Hung

25 January 2014 Round 11	Biu Chun Rangers	Cancelled	Happy Valley	Sham Shui Po, Mong Kok
14:30 UTC+8				Stadium: Sham Shui Po Sports Ground (Capacity: 2,194)

9 February 2014 Round 12	Happy Valley	Cancelled	Biu Chun Rangers	Tai Po, New Territories
14:30 UTC+8				Stadium: Tai Po Sports Ground (Capacity: 3,000)

16 February 2014 Round 13	Eastern Salon	3 – 4	Biu Chun Rangers	Mong Kok, Kowloon
14:30 UTC+8	Beto (yellow card) 17'; Diego 57'; Clayton 77'; Giovane (yellow card) 80'; Liang Zicheng 88'; Wong Chi Chung (yellow card) 90+1'	Report	(yellow card) 17' Schutz; (yellow card) 32' Chow Cheuk Fung; (yellow card) 41' (yellow-red card) 72' Joel; 48' (o.g.) Leung Chi Wing; 50' Chuck Yiu Kwok; 58' Miroslav; 63' Lam Hok Hei	Stadium: Mong Kok Stadium (Note: The match will be played at Mong Kok Stadium instead of Eastern Salon's home ground Shing Mun Valley Sports Ground.) (Capacity: 6,680); Attendance: 902; Referee: Ng Kai Lam; Assistant referees: Chan Ming Siu, Yu Chun Sun; Fourth official: Yu Kin Fung

23 February 2014 Round 14	Yokohama FC Hong Kong	4 – 1	Biu Chun Rangers	Tseung Kwan O, New Territories
17:30 UTC+8	Fukuda 9', 85'; Leung Nok Hang (yellow card) 12'; Yoshitake (yellow card) 30' (goal) 47'; Lau Cheuk Hin (yellow card) 65'; Wong Wai 87'	Report	(yellow card) 29' Law Hiu Chung; (yellow card) 30' (yellow-red card) 43' Liu Songwei; 32' Lam Hok Hei; (yellow card) 90+1' Chuck Yiu Kwok	Stadium: Tseung Kwan O Sports Ground (Capacity: 3,500); Attendance: 685; Referee: Ng Chiu Kok; Assistant referees: Lau Fong Hei, Fok Pong Shing; Fourth official: Luk Kin Sun

9 March 2014 Round 15	Biu Chun Rangers	1 – 4	Kitchee	Sham Shui Po, Mong Kok
14:30 UTC+8	Aender (yellow card) 30'; Miroslav 47'; Liu Songwei (yellow card) 90+3'	Report	(yellow card) 14' Dani; 43' (yellow card) 66' Matt Lam; (yellow card) 58' Jang Kyung-Jin; 74', 79' Alex; 90+1' Jordi	Stadium: Sham Shui Po Sports Ground (Capacity: 2,194); Attendance: 681; Referee: Liu Kwok Man; Assistant referees: Chan Ming Siu, Sarao Amarjit Singh; Fourth official: Fong Kwok Hong

16 March 2014 Round 16	Tuen Mun	Cancelled	Biu Chun Rangers	Tuen Mun, New Territories
14:30 UTC+8				Stadium: Tuen Mun Tang Shiu Kin Sports Ground (Capacity: 2,200)

23 March 2014 Round 17	Biu Chun Rangers	2 – 2	Citizen	Sham Shui Po, Mong Kok
14:30 UTC+8	Chuck Yiu Kwok 3'; Schutz (yellow card) 7' (goal) 24'	Report	58' Detinho; 69' Festus	Stadium: Sham Shui Po Sports Ground (Capacity: 2,194); Attendance: 471; Referee: Ng Kai Lam; Assistant referees: Lau Fong Hei, Ng Wai Hong; Fourth official: Lo Yuk Ming

29 March 2014 Round 18	Biu Chun Rangers	Postponed	South China	Sham Shui Po, Mong Kok
14:30 UTC+8				Stadium: Sham Shui Po Sports Ground (Capacity: 2,194)

6 April 2014 Round 19	Biu Chun Rangers	0 – 1	I-Sky Yuen Long	Sham Shui Po, Mong Kok
14:30 UTC+8	Schutz (yellow card) 31'; Luciano (yellow card) 47'; Chan Ming Kong (yellow card) 56'	Report	(yellow card) 18' (yellow-red card) 51' Cheung Chi Yung; 57' Souza; (yellow card) 90+5' Pang Tsz Kin	Stadium: Sham Shui Po Sports Ground (Capacity: 2,194); Attendance: 323; Referee: Ho Wai Sing; Assistant referees: Yu Chun Sun, Lee Chung Yin; Fourth official: Luk Kin Sun

20 April 2014 Round 20	Sunray Cave JC Sun Hei	1 – 2	Biu Chun Rangers	Tsing Yi, New Territories
17:30 UTC+8	Reinaldo 70'; Lai Yiu Cheong (yellow card) 73'; Roberto (yellow card) 86'	Report	6' Chao Pengfei; (yellow card) 24' Joel; 82' (yellow card) 83' (yellow-red card) 90+1' Schutz; (yellow card) 85' Chow Cheuk Fung; (yellow card) 90+1' Lam Hok Hei	Stadium: Tsing Yi Sports Ground (Capacity: 1,500); Attendance: 283; Referee: Liu Kwok Man; Assistant referees: Lui Siu Chuen, Chan Ming Siu; Fourth official: Tang Hing Fu

4 May 2014 Round 21	Biu Chun Rangers	v	Royal Southern	Sham Shui Po, Mong Kok
14:30 UTC+8				Stadium: Sham Shui Po Sports Ground (Capacity: 2,194)

10–11 May 2014 Round 22	Sun Pegasus	v	Biu Chun Rangers	Mong Kok, Kowloon
TBC				Stadium: Mong Kok Stadium (Capacity: 6,680)

=== Senior Shield ===
9 November 2013 1st Round	Kitchee	1 – 2	Biu Chun Rangers	Mong Kok, Kowloon
14:30 UTC+8	Rehman (yellow card) 43'; Lam Ka Wai (yellow card) 64'; Jordi Tarrés 70'; Dani Cancela (yellow card) 85'	Summary	Gil-Hoon Lee 2'; Tomas Maronesi (yellow card) 43'; Lam Hok Hei 55'	Stadium: Mong Kok Stadium (Capacity: 6,680); Attendance: 1,099

6 December 2013 Quarter-finals	South China	3 – 1	Biu Chun Rangers	Mong Kok, Kowloon
20:00 UTC+8	João Emir (yellow card) 22' (goal) 49'; Jack Sealy (yellow card) 26'; Dhiego Martins 90+1' (pen.); Lee Wai Lim 90+3'	Summary	Schutz (yellow card) 35' (goal) 61'; Lee Gil-Hoon (yellow card) 58'; Lai Ka Fai (yellow card) 72'	Stadium: Mong Kok Stadium (Capacity: 6,680); Attendance: 1,449
