= 2014–15 in Hong Kong football =

Football in Hong Kong
- Season: 2014–15

Men's football
- Premier League: Kitchee
- First Division: Metro Gallery Sun Source
- Second Division: Wing Yee
- Third Division: Tung Sing
- Senior Shield: Eastern
- FA Cup: Kitchee
- League Cup: Kitchee
- Season play-off: South China

The 2014–15 season is the 113th season of competitive football in Hong Kong, starting in July 2014 and ending in June 2015.

== Promotion and relegation ==
=== Pre-season ===
League	Promoted to League	Relegated from league
First Division^{1}	Wofoo Tai Po; Wong Tai Sin	Happy Valley; Tuen Mun; Royal Southern
Second Division	Yau Tsim Mong; Metro Gallery Sun Source	Wing Yee; Tuen Mun
Third Division	Sai Kung	Kowloon City; Telecom; Fu Moon
Fourth Division	Nil	Solon

^{1} The Premier League replace First Division League as the top-tier league in the 2014–15 season.

=== Post-season ===
League	Promoted to League	Relegated from league
Premier League	KC Southern District	Tai Po
First Division	Wing Yee	Happy Valley; Tuen Mun
Second Division	Tung Sing	New Fair Kuitan
Third Division	Nil	Lung Moon

== Representative team ==
=== Hong Kong national football team ===
==== 2015 EAFF East Asian Cup preliminary round ====
The 2015 EAFF East Asian Cup preliminary round 2 was held in Taiwan between 13 and 19 November 2014. Hong Kong was drawn with Guam, North Korea and Chinese Taipei. The winner of the preliminary round qualifies for the final round.

Pos	Team	Pld	W	D	L	GF	GA	GD	Pts	Qualification
1	North Korea	3	2	1	0	7	2	+5	7	Advance to Final Competition
2	Hong Kong	3	1	1	1	2	2	0	4	
3	Guam	3	1	1	1	3	6	−3	4	
4	Chinese Taipei (H)	3	0	1	2	1	3	−2	1	

Source: EAFF
(H) Hosts

13 November 2014 Matchday 1	North Korea	2–1	Hong Kong	Taipei, Taiwan
16:00 (UTC+8)	Ri Chol-myong 59'; O Hyok-chol 80'		McKee 83'	Stadium: Taipei Municipal Stadium; Attendance: 800; Referee: Hiroyuki Kimura (Japan)

16 November 2014 Matchday 2	Chinese Taipei	0–1	Hong Kong	Taipei, Taiwan
19:00 (UTC+8)			Lam Ka Wai 54' (pen.)	Stadium: Taipei Municipal Stadium; Attendance: 8,860; Referee: Kim Song-ho (North Korea)

19 November 2014 Matchday 3	Hong Kong	0–0	Guam	Taipei, Taiwan
16:00 (UTC+8)				Stadium: Taipei Municipal Stadium; Attendance: 167; Referee: Kim Dae-yong (South Korea)

==== 2015 Guangdong–Hong Kong Cup ====
This is a tournament between two teams representing Hong Kong and Guangdong Province of China respectively. The first leg will take place in Huizhou, Guangdong, being held at Huizhou Olympic Stadium, and the second leg took place in Hong Kong, being held at Mong Kok Stadium.

31 December 2014 1st Leg	Guangdong	1–0	Hong Kong	Huizhou, China
15:00 (UTC+8)	Lu Lin 69'	Report		Stadium: Huizhou Olympic Stadium

4 January 2015 2nd Leg	Hong Kong	0–0 (0–1 agg.)	Guangdong	Mong Kok, Hong Kong
15:00 (UTC+8)		Report		Stadium: Mong Kok Stadium; Attendance: 3,779; Referee: Luk Kin Sun (Hong Kong)

==== 2018 FIFA World Cup qualification ====
The draw for the group stage of second round qualification was held in Kuala Lumpur, Malaysia on 14 April 2015. Hong Kong was drawn with China PR, Qatar and Maldives and Bhutan in group C. Hong Kong has started their qualifying campaign in June 2015.

Pos	Team	Pld	W	D	L	GF	GA	GD	Pts	Qualification
1	Qatar	8	7	0	1	29	4	+25	21	World Cup qualifying third round and Asian Cup
2	China	8	5	2	1	27	1	+26	17	World Cup qualifying third round and Asian Cup
3	Hong Kong	8	4	2	2	13	5	+8	14	Asian Cup qualifying third round
4	Maldives	8	2	0	6	8	20	−12	6	Asian Cup qualifying play-off round
5	Bhutan	8	0	0	8	5	52	−47	0	Asian Cup qualifying play-off round

Rules for classification: Qualification tiebreakers

11 June 2015 Matchday 1	Hong Kong	7–0	Bhutan	Mong Kok, Hong Kong
20:00 (UTC+8)	McKee 19', 57'; Annan 23'; Lo Kwan Yee 30'; Ju Yingzhi 42'; Lam Ka Wai 49' (pen.); Godfred 67'	Report		Stadium: Mong Kok Stadium (Capacity: 6,680); Attendance: 6,326; Referee: Çarymyrat Gurbanow (Turkmenistan)

16 June 2015 Matchday 2	Hong Kong	2–0	Maldives	Mong Kok, Hong Kong
20:00 (UTC+8)	Xu Deshuai 63'; Lam Ka Wai 67'	Report		Stadium: Mong Kok Stadium (Capacity: 6,680); Attendance: 6,370; Referee: Adham Makhadmeh (Jordan)

==== Friendly matches in first half season ====
6 September 2014	Vietnam	3–1	Hong Kong	Hai Phong, Vietnam
17:00 (UTC+7)	Nguyễn Hải An 3', 51'; Lê Công Vinh 66'		58' Lam Ka Wai	Stadium: Lạch Tray Stadium; Referee: Sivakorn Pu-Udom (Thailand)

9 September 2014	Singapore	0–0	Hong Kong	Hougang, Vietnam
19:30 (UTC+8)				Stadium: Hougang Stadium; Referee: Bin Yaacob (Malaysia)

10 October 2014	Hong Kong	2–1	Singapore	Mong Kok, Hong Kong
20:00 (UTC+8)	Xu Deshuai 7'; Ju Yingzhi 52'	Report	Shahril 90+4'	Stadium: Mong Kok Stadium; Attendance: 2,203; Referee: Kao Jung Fang (Chinese Taipei)

14 October 2014	Hong Kong	0–7	Argentina	So Kon Po, Hong Kong
20:00 (UTC+8)		Report	Banega 19'; Higuaín 42', 54'; Gaitán 44', 73'; Messi 66', 85'	Stadium: Hong Kong Stadium; Attendance: 20,230; Referee: Yuichi Nishimura (Japan)

==== Friendly matches in second half season ====
28 March 2015	Hong Kong	1–0	Guam	Mong Kok, Hong Kong
16:00 (UTC+8)	McKee 10'	Report		Stadium: Mong Kok Stadium; Attendance: 3,607

6 June 2015	Malaysia	0–0	Hong Kong	Selangor, Malaysia
20:45 (UTC+8)				Stadium: Shah Alam Stadium

== League season ==
=== Premier League ===
Pos	Team	Pld	W	D	L	GF	GA	GD	Pts	Qualification or relegation
1	Kitchee	16	11	3	2	40	18	+22	36	Qualification to Champions League preliminary round 2
2	Eastern	16	10	3	3	34	20	+14	33	Qualification to season play-off (Note: As Kitchee won the FA Cup, Eastern finished 2nd in Premier League and won the Senior Challenge Shield, teams finishing 4th and 5th in Premier League entered the season play-off as well.)
3	Pegasus	16	8	3	5	34	23	+11	27 (Note: Pegasus wins head-to-head against South China.)	Qualification to season play-off
4	South China	16	7	6	3	30	17	+13	27	Qualification to AFC Cup group stage (Note: As winners of the season play-off.)
5	YFCMD	16	8	2	6	25	29	−4	26	Qualification to season play-off
6	Yuen Long	16	5	2	9	20	31	−11	17	
7	Rangers	16	4	2	10	20	33	−13	14 (Note: Rangers wins head-to-head against Wong Tai Sin.)	
8	Wong Tai Sin	16	3	5	8	20	29	−9	14	
9	Tai Po	16	1	4	11	17	40	−23	7	Relegation to First Division

Source: Hong Kong Football Association
Rules for classification: 1) Points; 2) Head-to-head points; 3) Head-to-head goal difference; 4) Head-to-head goals scored; 5) Goal difference; 6) Goals scored; 7) Fair-play points; 8) Drawing lots (Play-off if the winner has to be decided)

=== First Division League ===
Pos	Team	Pld	W	D	L	GF	GA	GD	Pts	Promotion or relegation
1	Sun Source (Note: Sun Source declined promotion to Premier League due to financial difficulties.) (C)	28	23	3	2	81	24	+57	72	
2	HKFC	28	18	6	4	93	31	+62	60 (Note: HKFC wins head-to-head against Southern.)	
3	Southern (P)	28	19	3	6	87	40	+47	60	Promotion to Premier League
4	Yau Tsim Mong	28	18	5	5	77	36	+41	59	
5	Citizen	28	15	7	6	68	38	+30	52	
6	Lucky Mile	28	14	5	9	56	47	+9	47	
7	Kwai Tsing	28	11	7	10	56	49	+7	40	
8	Sun Hei	28	11	4	13	58	58	0	37	
9	Shatin	28	9	7	12	55	64	−9	34	
10	Kwun Tong	28	8	7	13	35	54	−19	31	
11	Double Flower	28	8	4	16	41	65	−24	28	
12	Wanchai	28	7	2	19	36	63	−27	23 (Note: Wanchai wins head-to-head against Tai Chung.)	
13	Tai Chung	28	7	2	19	33	89	−56	23	
14	Happy Valley (R)	28	4	5	19	30	79	−49	17	Relegation to Second Division
15	Tuen Mun (R)	28	3	3	22	25	94	−69	12	Relegation to Second Division

Source: Hong Kong Football Association
Rules for classification: 1) Points; 2) Head-to-head points; 3) Head-to-head goal difference; 4) Head-to-head goals scored; 5) Goal difference; 6) Goals scored; 7) Fair-play points; 8) Drawing lots (Play-off if the winner has to be decided)
(C) Champions; (P) Promoted; (R) Relegated

=== Second Division League ===
Pos	Team	Pld	W	D	L	GF	GA	GD	Pts	Promotion or relegation
1	Wing Yee	22	19	2	1	76	21	+55	59	Promotion to First Division
2	Mutual	22	14	5	3	63	18	+45	47	
3	Kowloon City	22	13	4	5	50	20	+30	43	
4	Sai Kung	22	12	5	5	50	24	+26	41	
5	Eastern District	22	10	6	6	38	23	+15	36	
6	Kwong Wah	22	10	4	8	41	27	+14	34	
7	Sham Shui Po	22	10	3	9	48	35	+13	33	
8	Tsuen Wan	22	8	5	9	38	42	−4	29	
9	Tuen Mun FC	22	7	4	11	42	57	−15	25	
10	Kwok Keung	22	3	5	14	33	65	−32	14	
11	Fire Services	22	2	4	16	18	50	−32	10	Withdrew from League
12	New Fair Kui Tan	22	0	1	21	8	123	−115	1	Relegation to Third Division

Source: Hong Kong Football Association
Rules for classification: 1) Points; 2) Head-to-head points; 3) Head-to-head goal difference; 4) Head-to-head goals scored; 5) Goal difference; 6) Goals scored; 7) Fair-play points; 8) Drawing lots (Play-off if the winner has to be decided)

=== Third Division League ===
Pos	Team	Pld	W	D	L	GF	GA	GD	Pts	Promotion or relegation
1	Tung Sing	26	22	3	1	93	12	+81	69	Promotion to Second Division
2	Central & Western	26	20	3	3	81	16	+65	63	
3	St. Joseph's	26	16	6	4	60	26	+34	54	
4	Fukien	26	15	8	3	60	27	+33	53	
5	GFC Friends	26	15	2	9	64	26	+38	47	
6	Rainbow Legend North District	26	14	4	8	54	31	+23	46	
7	Islands	26	12	7	7	58	49	+9	43	
8	KCDRSC	26	11	3	12	45	37	+8	36	
9	Ornament	26	8	3	15	49	87	−38	27	
10	Telecom	26	8	1	17	42	62	−20	25	
11	King Mountain	26	5	4	17	29	76	−47	19 (Note: King Mountain wins head-to-head against Fu Moon.)	
12	Fu Moon	26	4	7	15	35	68	−33	19	
13	Kowloon Cricket Club	26	4	2	20	23	74	−51	14	
14	Lung Moon	26	1	1	24	22	124	−102	4	Elimination from League

Source: Hong Kong Football Association
Rules for classification: 1) Points; 2) Head-to-head points; 3) Head-to-head goal difference; 4) Head-to-head goals scored; 5) Goal difference; 6) Goals scored; 7) Fair-play points; 8) Drawing lots

== Cup competitions ==
=== Community Cup ===
31 August 2014
15:00 UTC+8

Kitchee	0–2	South China
	Report	Lee Wai Lim 18'; Chan Siu Ki 60'

Mong Kok Stadium, Mong Kok, Kowloon
Attendance: 4,008
Referee: Ng Chiu Kok

=== Senior Shield ===
17 January 2015
14:30 UTC+8
Final

Kitchee	2–3	Eastern
Belencoso 38'; Jordi 90+3'	Report	Miroslav 11', 83'; Macallister 64'

Hong Kong Stadium, So Kon Po, Hong Kong
Attendance: 6,133
Referee: Liu Kwok Man

=== FA Cup ===
17 May 2015
15:00 UTC+8
Final

Kitchee	2–0 (a.e.t.)	Eastern
Belencoso 100', 116'	Report

Mong Kok Stadium, Mong Kok, Kowloon
Attendance: 4,348
Referee: Ng Chiu Kok

=== League Cup ===
22 April 2015
20:00 UTC+8
Final

South China	0–4	Kitchee
	Report	Paulinho 5', 12'; Belencoso 77'; Jordi 90+6'

Mong Kok Stadium, Mong Kok, Kowloon
Attendance: 5,082
Referee: Tong Kui Sum

=== Season play-off ===
30 May 2015
15:00 UTC+8
Final

YFCMD	1–1 (a.e.t.)	South China
Díaz 56'	Report	Lo Kong Wai 33'
Penalties
Fong Pak Lun (penalty missed); Díaz (penalty scored); Hady Barry (penalty missed); Moses (penalty scored)	2–4	(penalty scored) Yuto Nakamura; (penalty scored) Itaparica; (penalty missed) Russell; (penalty scored) Mora; (penalty scored) Jack Sealy

Mong Kok Stadium, Mong Kok, Kowloon
Attendance: 2,492
Referee: Ho Wai Sing
