= Hélio (footballer) =

Hong Kong footballer (born 1986)

Hélio 艾里奧
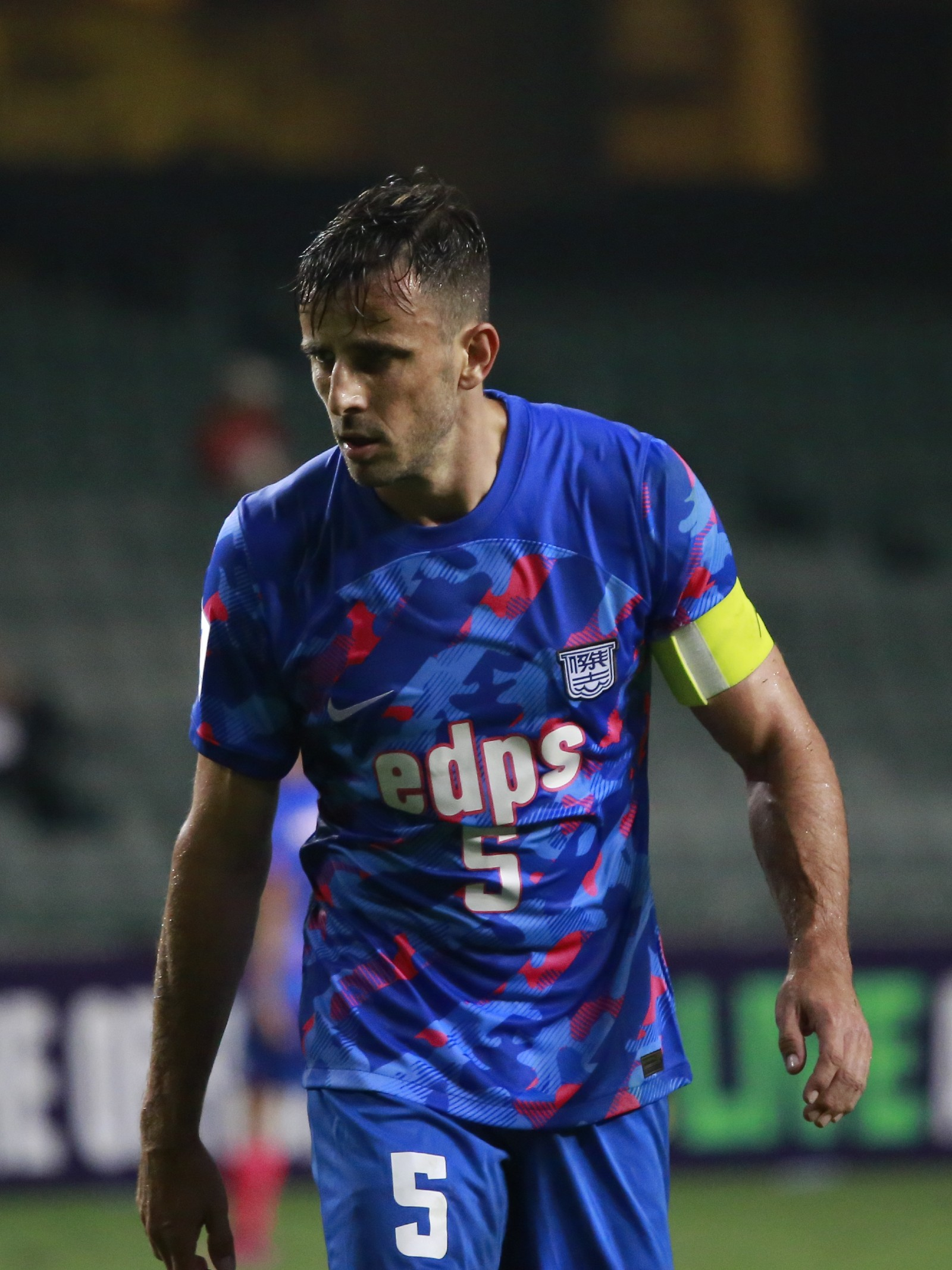
- Hélio with Kitchee in 2023

Personal information
- Full name: Hélio José de Souza Gonçalves
- Date of birth: 31 January 1986 (age 40)
- Place of birth: Ribeirão Preto, Brazil
- Height: 1.85 m (6 ft 1 in)
- Position: Centre back

Team information
- Current team: Eastern District
- Number: 5

Youth career
- 2002–2006: Santos

Senior career*
Years	Team	Apps	(Gls)
2006–2007	Ceará	0	(0)
2007	Olímpia	20	(2)
2008–2014	Citizen	111	(10)
2014–2025	Kitchee	121	(2)
2025–	Eastern District	28	(1)

International career^{‡}
2026–	Hong Kong U-23	3	(0)
2016–2024	Hong Kong	38	(1)

Managerial career
- 2025–: Eastern District (assistant coach)
- * Club domestic league appearances and goals as of 8 November 2026 ‡ National team caps and goals as of 11 October 2026

Hélio José de Souza Gonçalves (born 31 January 1986), commonly known as Hélio (Portuguese: [ˈɛlju]; Chinese: 艾里奧, Cantonese: [ŋàːi le̬i (ŋ)ōu]), is a professional footballer who currently plays as a centre back for Hong Kong Premier League club Eastern District. He is also the assistant coach of the club. Born in Brazil, he plays for the Hong Kong national team.

== Club career ==
=== Early career ===
Hélio transferred from Sántos B to Ceará at the beginning of the 2006–07 season. Then, he joined Olímpia at the beginning of the 2007–08 season without playing a single game for Ceará. He played 20 games for Olímpia, scoring 2 goals. After that, he joined Hong Kong First Division League club Citizen in the winter transfer window 6 months later.

=== Citizen ===
Hélio played a total of 111 league games for Citizen, scoring 10 goals in his 6-year stay at the club. He won the HKFA Senior Challenge Shield once with the club. He left the club for Kitchee in the summer transfer window of 2014.

=== Kitchee ===
He has played a total of 82 league games for Kitchee thus far, scoring a single goal, and has won the HKPL and the HKFA League Cup twice with the team, and has won the Season play-offs and Senior Challenge Shield once with Kitchee. He also completed the treble with the team in the 2016–17 season.

On 27 March 2018, Hélio suffered an injury after playing for Hong Kong in an AFC Asian Cup qualifier against North Korea and was substituted in the 11th minute. The injury left him out of action for 9 months until he returned on 16 December 2018 as a late substitute against Hoi King.

On 25 May 2025, it was confirmed that Hélio would leave the club after 11 years.

=== Eastern District ===
On 23 July 2025, Hélio joined Eastern District.

== International career ==
Born in Brazil, Hélio acquired his HKSAR passport on 31 October 2015 and is eligible to represent Hong Kong on the international level.

On 3 June 2016, Hélio made his international debut for Hong Kong in a 2016 AYA Bank Cup match against Vietnam.

On 26 December 2023, Hélio was named in Hong Kong's squad for the 2023 AFC Asian Cup.

== Career statistics ==
=== Club ===
As of 22 May 2021

Club	Season	League		Senior Shield		League Cup		FA Cup		AFC Cup		Total	
Club	Season	Apps	Goals	Apps	Goals	Apps	Goals	Apps	Goals	Apps	Goals	Apps	Goals
Citizen	2008–09	?	3	-		-		-		-		?	3
Citizen	2009–10	16	0	-		-		-		-		16	0
Citizen	2010–11	13	2	-		-		1	0	-		14	2
Citizen	2011–12	17	2	-		2	0	1	0	6	1	26	3
Citizen	2012–13	16	2	7	0	-		2	0	-		25	2
Citizen	2013–14	19	1	1	0	-		2	0	-		22	1
Kitchee	2014–15	10	0	1	0	2	0	2	0	-		15	0
Kitchee	2015–16	6	0	1	0	2	0	1	0	-		10	0
Kitchee	2016–17	19	1	3	0	-		4	1	2	0	28	2
Kitchee	2017–18	8	0	1	0	-		-		4	0	13	0
Kitchee	2018–19	8	0	1	0	-		3	1	7	0	19	1
Kitchee	2019–20	12	0	0	0	-		1	0	-		13	0
Kitchee	2020–21	15	0	-		-		-		-		15	0
	Total	159	11	15	0	6	0	17	2	19	1	216	14

=== International ===
As of matches played 11 June 2024

National team	Year	Apps	Goals
Hong Kong	2016	6	0
Hong Kong	2017	10	0
Hong Kong	2018	1	0
Hong Kong	2019	5	0
Hong Kong	2020	0	0
Hong Kong	2021	3	0
Hong Kong	2022	2	0
Hong Kong	2023	7	1
Hong Kong	2024	4	0
Total		38	1

#	Date	Venue	Opponent	Result	Competition
1	3 June 2016	Thuwunna Stadium, Myanmar	Vietnam	2–2	2016 AYA Bank Cup
1	6 June 2016	Thuwunna Stadium, Myanmar	Myanmar	0–3	2016 AYA Bank Cup
3	1 September 2016	Mong Kok Stadium, Hong Kong	Cambodia	4–2	Friendly
4	11 October 2016	Mong Kok Stadium, Mong Kok, Hong Kong	Singapore	2–0	Friendly
5	9 November 2016	Mong Kok Stadium, Mong Kok, Hong Kong	Chinese Taipei	4–2	EAFF E-1 Football Championship 2017 Round 2
6	12 November 2016	Mong Kok Stadium, Mong Kok, Hong Kong	North Korea	0–1	EAFF E-1 Football Championship 2017 Round 2
7	23 March 2017	King Abdullah II Stadium, Jordan	Jordan	0–4	Friendly
8	28 March 2017	Camille Chamoun Sports City Stadium, Beirut, Lebanon	Lebanon	0–2	2019 AFC Asian Cup qualification
9	7 June 2017	Mong Kok Stadium, Hong Kong	Jordan	0–0	Friendly
10	13 June 2017	Hong Kong Stadium, So Kon Po, Hong Kong	North Korea	1–1	2019 AFC Asian Cup qualification
11	31 August 2017	Jalan Besar Stadium, Singapore	Singapore	1–1	Friendly
12	5 September 2017	Hang Jebat Stadium, Malacca City, Malaysia	Malaysia	1–1	2019 AFC Asian Cup qualification
13	5 October 2017	Mong Kok Stadium, Mong Kok, Hong Kong	Laos	4–0	Friendly
14	10 October 2017	Hong Kong Stadium, So Kon Po, Hong Kong	Malaysia	2–0	2019 AFC Asian Cup qualification
15	9 November 2017	Mong Kok Stadium, Mong Kok, Hong Kong	Bahrain	0–2	Friendly
16	14 November 2017	Hong Kong Stadium, So Kon Po, Hong Kong	Lebanon	0–1	2019 AFC Asian Cup qualification
17	27 March 2018	Kim Il-sung Stadium, Pyongyang, North Korea	North Korea	0–2	2019 AFC Asian Cup qualification
18	5 September 2019	Phnom Penh Olympic Stadium, Phnom Penh, Cambodia	Cambodia	1–1	2022 FIFA World Cup qualification
19	10 September 2019	Hong Kong Stadium, So Kon Po, Hong Kong	Iran	0–2	2022 FIFA World Cup qualification
20	10 October 2019	Basra International Stadium, Basra, Iraq	Iraq	0–2	2022 FIFA World Cup qualification
21	11 December 2019	Busan Asiad Main Stadium, Busan, South Korea	South Korea	0–2	2019 EAFF E-1 Football Championship
22	19 December 2019	Busan Asiad Main Stadium, Busan, South Korea	China	0–2	2019 EAFF E-1 Football Championship
23	3 June 2021	Al Muharraq Stadium, Arad, Bahrain	Iran	1–3	2022 FIFA World Cup qualification
24	11 June 2021	Al Muharraq Stadium, Arad, Bahrain	Iraq	0–1	2022 FIFA World Cup qualification
25	15 June 2021	Al Muharraq Stadium, Arad, Bahrain	Bahrain	0–4	2022 FIFA World Cup qualification
26	21 September 2022	Mong Kok Stadium, Mong Kok, Hong Kong	Myanmar	2–0	Friendly
27	24 September 2022	Hong Kong Stadium, So Kon Po, Hong Kong	Myanmar	0–0	Friendly
28	23 March 2023	Mong Kok Stadium, Mong Kok, Hong Kong	Singapore	1–1	Friendly
29	15 June 2023	Lạch Tray Stadium, Hai Phong, Vietnam	Vietnam	0–1	Friendly
30	7 September 2023	National Olympic Stadium, Phnom Penh, Cambodia	Cambodia	1–1	Friendly
31	11 September 2023	Hong Kong Stadium, So Kon Po, Hong Kong	Brunei	10–0	Friendly
32	12 October 2023	Hong Kong Stadium, So Kon Po, Hong Kong	Bhutan	4–0	2026 FIFA World Cup qualification – AFC first round
33	17 October 2023	Changlimithang Stadium, Thimphu, Bhutan	Bhutan	0–2	2026 FIFA World Cup qualification – AFC first round
34	21 November 2023	Changlimithang Stadium, Thimphu, Bhutan	Turkmenistan	2–2	2026 FIFA World Cup qualification – AFC second round
35	1 January 2024	Baniyas Stadium, Abu Dhabi, United Arab Emirates	China	2–1	Friendly
36	21 March 2024	Mong Kok Stadium, Mong Kok, Hong Kong	Uzbekistan	0–2	2026 FIFA World Cup qualification – AFC second round
37	6 June 2024	Hong Kong Stadium, So Kon Po, Hong Kong	Iran	2–4	2026 FIFA World Cup qualification – AFC second round
38	11 June 2024	Ashgabat Stadium, Ashgabat, Turkmenistan	Turkmenistan	0–0	2026 FIFA World Cup qualification – AFC second round

Scores and results list Hong Kong's goal tally first, score column indicates score after each Hélio goal.

List of international goals scored by Hélio
No.	Date	Venue	Opponent	Score	Result	Competition
1.	11 September 2023	Hong Kong Stadium, So Kon Po, Hong Kong	Brunei	3–0	10–0	Friendly

== Honours ==
Citizen

- Hong Kong Senior Shield: 2010–11

Kitchee

- Hong Kong Premier League: 2014–15, 2016–17, 2017–18, 2019–20, 2020–21, 2022–23
- Hong Kong FA Cup: 2014–15, 2016–17, 2017–18, 2018–19, 2022–23
- Hong Kong Senior Shield: 2016–17, 2018–19, 2022–23, 2023–24
- Hong Kong Sapling Cup: 2017–18, 2019–20
- Hong Kong League Cup: 2014–15, 2015–16
- Hong Kong Community Cup: 2016–17, 2017–18
- AFC Cup Play-off: 2015–16
