= 2013–14 Hong Kong FA Cup =

Tournament details
- Country: Hong Kong
- Teams: 49

Final positions
- Champions: Eastern (4th title)
- Runners-up: Kitchee

Tournament statistics
- Matches played: 6
- Goals scored: 29 (4.83 per match)
- Attendance: 2,899 (483 per match)

The 2013–14 Hong Kong FA Cup was the 40th edition of Hong Kong FA Cup. It was a knockout competition for all the teams of the 2013–14 Hong Kong First Division League. Unlike the previous season, the format changed back into a single-legged competition.

It was the first time since the 2008–09 edition that lower divisions teams were involved in the competition. 4 teams from the preliminary round were qualified for the proper round.

The winner guaranteed a place in the 2013–14 Hong Kong season play-off.

== Teams ==
Round	Clubs remaining	Clubs involved	Winners from previous round	New entries this round	Leagues entering at this round	Scheduled playing date
Preliminary first round	49	10	0	10	10 teams from Second Division, Third Division and Fourth Division	8 December 2013
Preliminary second round	44	32	5	27	Remaining teams from the Second Division, Third Division and Fourth Division	8 & 15 December 2013
Preliminary third round	28	16	16	0	None	22 December 2013
Preliminary quarter-finals	20	8	8	0	None	29 December 2013
Preliminary semi-finals	16	4	4	0	None	5 January 2014
Preliminary 3rd-place playoff^{1}	16	2	0 (2 losers)	0	None	12 January 2014
Preliminary final^{1}	16	2	2	0	None	12 January 2014
First round proper	16	16	4^{2}	12	First Division	TBC
Quarter-finals	8	8	8	0	None	12 & 13 April 2014
Semi-finals	4	4	4	0	None	26 & 27 April 2014
Final	2	2	2	0	None	18 May 2014 at Hong Kong Stadium

Note:
^{1} 4 teams that reach preliminary semi-finals are qualified for the proper round of the cup. Therefore, the 3rd place playoff and the final do not affect the number of clubs remaining.
^{2} These 4 winners are from preliminary semi-finals.

== Fixtures and results ==
=== Bracket ===
First round
Happy Valley	w/d
Royal Southern	w/o
Metro Gallery Sun Source	0
Citizen	3
Sunray Cave JC Sun Hei	9
Kwai Tsing	1
Eastern Salon	3
Yokohama FC Hong Kong	1
Wofoo Tai Po	0
Biu Chun Rangers	2
Tuen Mun	w/d
I-Sky Yuen Long	w/o
South China	3
Sun Pegasus	2
HKFC	0
Kitchee	5

Second round
Royal Southern	1
Citizen	0
Sunray Cave JC Sun Hei	0
Eastern Salon	1
Biu Chun Rangers (p)	0 (5)
I-Sky Yuen Long	0 (4)
South China	0 (1)
Kitchee (p)	0 (3)

Semi-finals
Royal Southern	1
Eastern Salon	2
Biu Chun Rangers	1
Kitchee	2

Final
Eastern Salon	1
Kitchee	0

=== Round of 16 ===
11 February 2014	Metro Gallery Sun Source (3)	0 – 3	Citizen (1)	Mong Kok, Kowloon
20:00 (UTC+8)	Lau Tsz Leung (yellow card) 6'	Report	63' Paulinho; 90+1', 90+5' Detinho	Stadium: Mong Kok Stadium (Capacity: 6,680); Attendance: 562; Referee: Luk Kin Sun; Assistant referees: Chow Chun Kit, Fok Pong Shing; Fourth official: Ho Wai Sing

12 February 2014	Sunray Cave JC Sun Hei (1)	9 – 1	Kwai Tsing (2)	Mong Kok, Kowloon
20:00 (UTC+8)	Wong Chun Hin 4'; Lugo 16', 56'; Reinaldo 37', 51'; Cheung Kwok Ming 57'; Zhang Jun 69', 76'; Jing Teng (yellow card) 77'; Bouet 84'	Report	44' Wong Sheung Choi; (yellow card) 63' de Clarens	Stadium: Mong Kok Stadium (Capacity: 6,680); Attendance: 283; Referee: Lau Fong Hei; Assistant referees: Lam Chi Ho, Yau Tsz Yeung; Fourth official: Tang Hing Fu

18 February 2014	Happy Valley (1)	DQ – w/o	Royal Southern (1)	Mong Kok, Kowloon
20:00 (UTC+8)				Stadium: Mong Kok Stadium (Capacity: 6,680)

19 February 2014	Tuen Mun (1)	DQ – w/o	I-Sky Yuen Long (1)	Mong Kok, Kowloon
20:00 (UTC+8)				Stadium: Mong Kok Stadium (Capacity: 6,680)

1 March 2014	Eastern Salon (1)	3 – 1	Yokohama FC Hong Kong (1)	Mong Kok, Kowloon
14:30 (UTC+8)	Macallister 20', 45+1'; Liang Zicheng 38'; Diego (yellow card) 50'; Wong Chi Chung (red card) 90+5'	Report	(yellow card) 52' Leung Kwun Chung; 74' Fukuda; (yellow card) 78' Li Chu Yeung	Stadium: Mong Kok Stadium (Capacity: 6,680); Attendance: 1,071; Referee: Ng Chiu Kok; Assistant referees: Lam Chi Ho, Sarao Amarjit Singh; Fourth official: Chan Ming Siu

2 March 2014	Wofoo Tai Po (2)	0 – 2	Biu Chun Rangers (1)	Mong Kok, Kowloon
14:30 (UTC+8)	Chen Jingde (yellow card) 32'	Report	45+2' Chuck Yiu Kwok; 47' Luciano	Stadium: Mong Kok Stadium (Capacity: 6,680); Attendance: 983; Referee: Lau Fong Hei; Assistant referees: Lam Nai Kei, Yu Chun Sun; Fourth official: Liu Kwok Man

25 March 2014	South China (1)	3 – 2	Sun Pegasus (1)	Mong Kok, Kowloon
20:00 (UTC+8)	Tse (yellow card) 37'; Kajkut (yellow card) 45+2' (goal) 71' (pen.); Kwok Kin Pong (yellow card) 52'; Barisic 52', 90+2' (yellow card) 72'	Report	10' (yellow card) 75' Ju Yingzhi; 19' McKee; (yellow card) 37' Mbome; (yellow card) 49' Tong Kin Man; (yellow card) 75' So Wai Chuen	Stadium: Mong Kok Stadium (Capacity: 6,680); Attendance: 2,055; Referee: Tong Kui Sum; Assistant referees: Chow Chun Kit, Lam Chi Ho; Fourth official: Luk Kin Sun

26 March 2014	HKFC (2)	0 – 5	Kitchee (1)	Mong Kok, Kowloon
20:00 (UTC+8)		Report	Alex 8'	Stadium: Mong Kok Stadium (Capacity: 6,680)

=== Quarter-finals ===
12 April 2014 QF1	Royal Southern (1)	1 – 0	Citizen (1)	Tseung Kwan O, Kowloon
14:30 UTC+8	Lee Sze Ho (yellow card) 21'; Chung Hon Chee (yellow card) 22'; Ngan Lok Fung 76'; Chan Cheuk Kwong (yellow card) 88'; Che Runqiu (yellow card) 89'; Zhang Chunhui (yellow card) 90+3'	Report	(yellow card) 55' Krasić	Stadium: Tseung Kwan O Sports Ground (Capacity: 3,500); Attendance: 322; Referee: Luk Kin Sun; Assistant referees: Cheng Oi Cho, Tang Hing Fu; Fourth official: Chan Shui Hung

12 April 2014 QF2	Sunray Cave JC Sun Hei (1)	0 – 1	Eastern Salon (1)	Mong Kok, Kowloon
17:30 UTC+8	Kilama (yellow card) 41'; Cheung Kwok Ming (yellow card) 43' (yellow-red card) 88'; Roberto (yellow card) 55'	Report	11' Li Haiqiang; (yellow card) 27' Clayton; (yellow card) 83' Leung Tsz Chun; (yellow card) 84' Diego; (yellow card) 90+4' Liang Zicheng	Stadium: Mong Kok Stadium (Capacity: 6,680); Attendance: 1,010; Referee: Ho Wai Sing; Assistant referees: Chow Chun Kit, Lam Chi Ho; Fourth official: Ng Chiu Kok

13 April 2014 QF3	Biu Chun Rangers (1)	0 – 0 (a.e.t.) (5 – 4 p)	I-Sky Yuen Long (1)	Tseung Kwan O, Kowloon
14:30 UTC+8	Moses (yellow card) 51'; Miroslav (yellow card) 105'	Report		Stadium: Tseung Kwan O Sports Ground (Capacity: 3,500); Attendance: 182; Referee: Ng Kai Lam; Assistant referees: Lam Chi Ho, Fok Pong Shing; Fourth official: Yu Kin Fung
	Penalties
	Joel (penalty missed); Miroslav (penalty scored); Luciano (penalty scored); Lam Hok Hei (penalty scored); Moses (penalty scored); Tomas (penalty scored)		(penalty scored) Souza; (penalty scored) Gustavo; (penalty scored) Marques; (penalty scored) Cheng King Ho; (penalty missed) Sandro; (penalty missed) Chiu Chun Kit

13 April 2014 QF4	South China (1)	0 – 0 (a.e.t.) (1 – 3 p)	Kitchee (1)	Mong Kok, Kowloon
17:30 UTC+8	Lee Chi Ho (yellow card) 30'; Chan Siu Ki (yellow card) 77'; Ticão (yellow card) 83'; Dhiego (yellow card) 87'; Barisic (yellow card) 100'; Kwok Kin Pong (yellow card) 110'; Chan Wai Ho (yellow card) 115'	Report	(yellow card) 31' Xu Deshuai; (yellow card) 84' Alex; (yellow card) 105' Cascón	Stadium: Mong Kok Stadium (Capacity: 6,680); Attendance: 3,125; Referee: Ng Chiu Kok; Assistant referees: Lam Nai Kei, Chan Shui Hung; Fourth official: Lau Fong Hei
	Penalties
	Barisic (penalty scored); Weijl (penalty missed); Lee Hong Lim (penalty missed); Ticão (penalty missed)		(penalty scored) Cascón; (penalty scored) Jordi; (penalty missed) Jang Kyung-Jin; (penalty scored) Annan

=== Semi-finals ===
26 April 2014 SF1	Royal Southern (1)	1 – 2	Eastern Salon (1)	Mong Kok, Kowloon
14:30 UTC+8	Dieguito 70'	Report	Macallister 28', 90+6'	Stadium: Mong Kok Stadium (Capacity: 6,680); Attendance: 1,334

27 April 2014 SF2	Biu Chun Rangers (1)	1 – 2	Kitchee (1)	Mong Kok, Kowloon
14:30 UTC+8	Chuck Yiu Kwok 31'	Report	Jordi 14'; Akande 83'	Stadium: Mong Kok Stadium (Capacity: 6,680); Attendance: 1,401

=== Final ===
18 May 2014 Final	Eastern Salon	1 – 0	Kitchee	So Kon Po, Hong Kong Island
16:00 UTC+8	Giovane 120'	Report		Stadium: Hong Kong Stadium (Capacity:40,000); Attendance: 4,383

== Scorer ==
The scorers in the 2013–14 Hong Kong FA Cup are as follows:

2 goals

- (Brazil) Detinho (Citizen)
- (Australia) Dylan Macallister (Eastern Salon)
- (Australia) Andrew Barisic (South China)
- (Brazil) Michel Lugo (Sunray Cave JC Sun Hei)
- (Brazil) Reinaldo (Sunray Cave JC Sun Hei)
- (China) Zhang Jun (Sunray Cave JC Sun Hei)

1 goal

- (Hong Kong) Chuck Yiu Kwok (Biu Chun Rangers)
- (Brazil) Luciano Silva (Biu Chun Rangers)
- (Brazil) Paulinho (Citizen)
- (China) Liang Zicheng (Eastern Salon)
- (Hong Kong) Li Haiqiang (Eastern Salon)
- (Hong Kong) Wong Sheung Choi (Kwai Tsing)
- (Hong Kong) Ngan Lok Fung (Royal Southern)
- (Bosnia and Herzegovina) Saša Kajkut (South China)
- (Hong Kong) Cheung Kwok Ming (Sunray Cave JC Sun Hei)
- (Cameroon) Yrel Cedrique Arnaud Bouet (Sunray Cave JC Sun Hei)
- (Hong Kong) Wong Chun Hin (Sunray Cave JC Sun Hei)
- (Hong Kong) Ju Yingzhi (Sun Pegasus)
- (Hong Kong) Jaimes McKee (Sun Pegasus)
- (Japan) Kenji Fukuda (Yokohama FC Hong Kong)
