= Chan Cham Hei =

Hong Kong footballer

Chan Cham Hei 陳湛羲
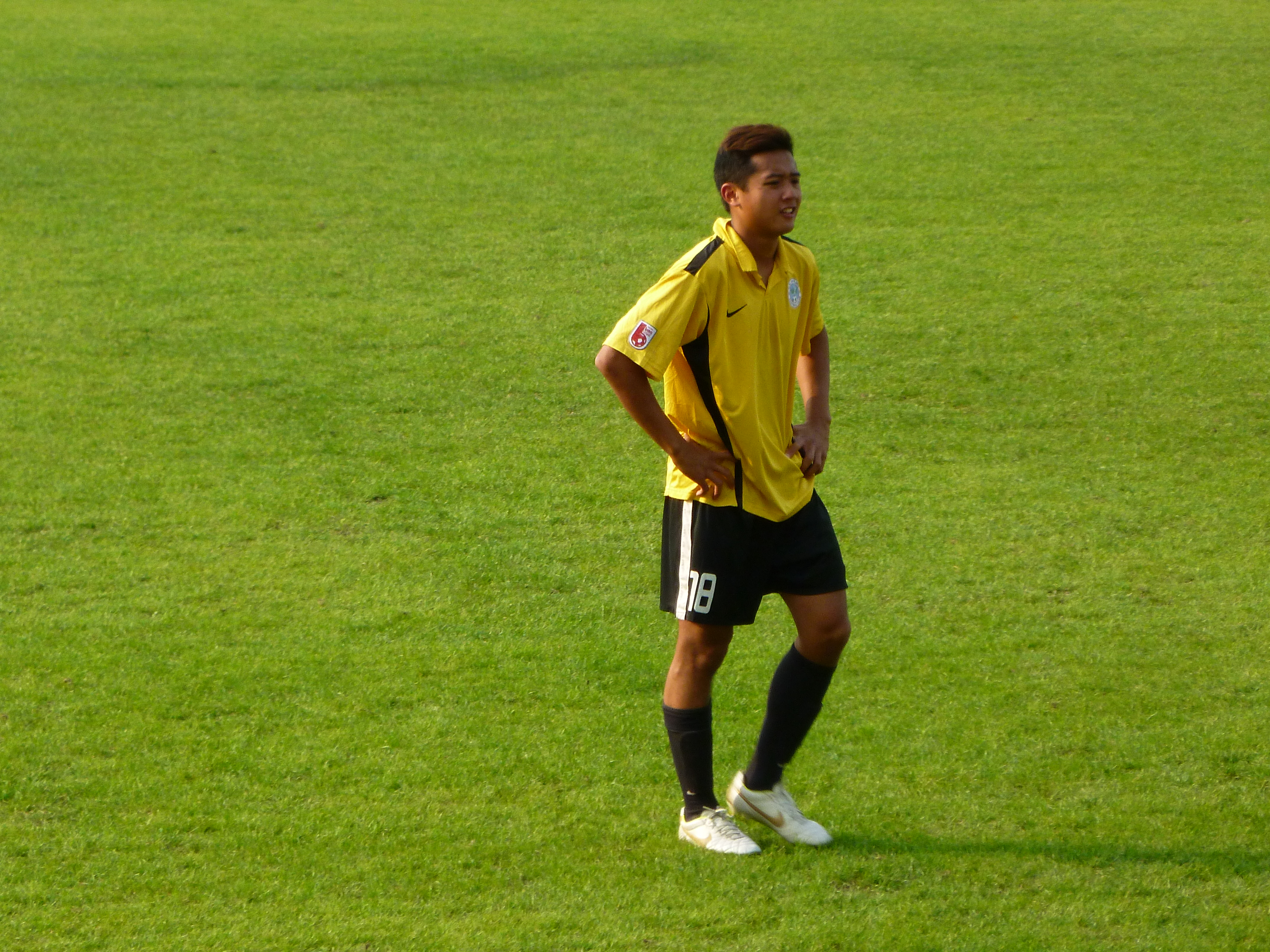

Personal information
- Full name: Chan Cham Hei
- Date of birth: 17 June 1991 (age 35)
- Place of birth: Hong Kong
- Height: 1.80 m (5 ft 11 in)
- Position: Left back

Senior career*
Years	Team	Apps	(Gls)
2008–2009	Fourway	8	(0)
2009–2011	Fourway Rangers	18	(0)
2011–2012	→ HK Sapling (loan)	21	(0)
2012–2013	South China	3	(0)
2013	Hong Kong Rangers	1	(0)
2014	Happy Valley	0	(0)
2014–2015	Kitchee	2	(0)
2015	Lung Moon	11	(6)
2015–2016	Southern	24	(0)
2016–2017	Biu Chun Glory Sky	8	(0)
2016–2017	→ Tai Po (loan)	4	(0)
2017–2018	Dreams	0	(0)
2018–2019	Hong Kong Rangers	15	(0)

International career
2011	Hong Kong U-21	4	(0)
- * Club domestic league appearances and goals as of 15 April 2018

Chan Cham Hei (Chinese: 陳湛羲; Cantonese Yale: Chàn Jaamhēi, born 17 June 1991 in Hong Kong) is a Hong Kong former professional football player who played as a left-back.

== Career statistics ==
As of 15 December 2012

Club	Season	League		Senior Shield		League Cup		FA Cup		AFC Cup		Total	
Club	Season	Apps	Goals	Apps	Goals	Apps	Goals	Apps	Goals	Apps	Goals	Apps	Goals
Fourway Rangers	2010–11	4	0	0	0	1	0	0	0	— (Note: The team did not compete in AFC Cup in that season.)		5	0
Fourway Rangers Total		4	0	0	0	1	0	0	0	0	0	5	0
Hong Kong Sapling	2011–12	16	0	2	0	1	0	2	0	—		21	0
Hong Kong Sapling Total		16	0	2	0	1	0	2	0	0	0	21	0
South China	2012–13	1	0	1	0	— (Note: League Cup was not held in that season.)		1	0	—		3	0
South China Total		1	0	1	0	0	0	1	0	0	0	3	0
Career Total		21	0	3	0	2	0	3	0	0	0	29	0

== Honours ==
Eastern

- Hong Kong First Division: 2014–15
- Hong Kong FA Cup: 2014-15
- Hong Kong League Cup: 2014-15

Kitchee

- Hong Kong First Division: 2013-14

South China

- Hong Kong First Division: 2012-13
