= 2014–15 Hong Kong season play-off =

Tournament details
- Country: Hong Kong
- Teams: 4

Final positions
- Champions: South China
- Runners-up: YFCMD
- AFC Cup: South China

Tournament statistics
- Matches played: 3
- Goals scored: 9 (3 per match)
- Attendance: 4,879 (1,626 per match)
- Top goal scorer(s): Daniel McBreen (South China); Fernando (YFCMD) (2 goals)

2014–15 season play-off for the 2014–15 Hong Kong football season is the 3rd season of the tournament. It will be held in May 2015. All matches will take place at Mong Kok Stadium in Mong Kok, Kowloon.

The play-off semi-finals are played in one match each, contested by the teams who finished in 2nd and 3rd place in the Premier League table, the winners of the Senior Challenge Shield and the champions of the FA Cup. The winners of the semi-finals go through to the finals, with the winner of the final gaining participation for the 2016 AFC Cup group stage.

As Kitchee won the FA Cup and Eastern won the Senior Shield, as well as coming in 2nd place in the Premier League, teams therefore finishing in 4th and 5th place in the Hong Kong Premier League entered.

== Qualified ==
=== Premier League ===
Pos	Team	Pld	W	D	L	GF	GA	GD	Pts	Qualification or relegation
1	Kitchee	16	11	3	2	40	18	+22	36	Qualification to Champions League preliminary round 2
2	Eastern	16	10	3	3	34	20	+14	33	Qualification to season play-off (Note: As Kitchee won the FA Cup, Eastern finished 2nd in Premier League and won the Senior Challenge Shield, teams finishing 4th and 5th in Premier League entered the season play-off as well.)
3	Pegasus	16	8	3	5	34	23	+11	27 (Note: Pegasus wins head-to-head against South China.)	Qualification to season play-off
4	South China	16	7	6	3	30	17	+13	27	Qualification to AFC Cup group stage (Note: As winners of the season play-off.)
5	YFCMD	16	8	2	6	25	29	−4	26	Qualification to season play-off
6	Yuen Long	16	5	2	9	20	31	−11	17	
7	Rangers	16	4	2	10	20	33	−13	14 (Note: Rangers wins head-to-head against Wong Tai Sin.)	
8	Wong Tai Sin	16	3	5	8	20	29	−9	14	
9	Tai Po	16	1	4	11	17	40	−23	7	Relegation to First Division

Source: Hong Kong Football Association
Rules for classification: 1) Points; 2) Head-to-head points; 3) Head-to-head goal difference; 4) Head-to-head goals scored; 5) Goal difference; 6) Goals scored; 7) Fair-play points; 8) Drawing lots (Play-off if the winner has to be decided)

=== Senior Challenge Shield ===
The winners of the Senior Challenge Shield will guarantee a place in the play-off.

Winners:

- Eastern

=== FA Cup ===
The winners of the FA Cup will guarantee a place in the play-off.

Winners:

- Kitchee

== Calendar ==
Round	Date	Matches	Clubs
Semi-finals	21 & 27 May 2015	2	4 → 2
Final	30 May 2015 at Mong Kok Stadium	1	2 → 1

== Bracket ==
Semi-finals
Eastern	0
South China	2
Pegasus	2
YFCMD	3

Final
South China	1 (4)
YFCMD	1 (2)

== Fixtures and results ==
=== Semi-finals ===
21 May 2015	Eastern	0–2	South China	Mong Kok Stadium, Kowloon
20:00 UTC+8		Report	McBreen 19', 68'	Attendance: 1,996; Referee: Tong Kui Sum

27 May 2015	YFCMD	3–2	Pegasus	Siu Sai Wan Sports Ground, Hong Kong Island
20:00 UTC+8	Fernando 28', 32'; Barry 72'	Report	Chan Man Fai 80'; Festus 86' (pen.)	Attendance: 391; Referee: Ng Chiu Kok

=== Final ===
30 May 2015	YFCMD	1–1 (a.e.t.) (2–4 p)	South China	Mong Kok Stadium, Kowloon
15:00 UTC+8	Díaz 56'	Report	Lo Kong Wai 33'	Attendance: 2,492; Referee: Ho Wai Sing
	Penalties
	Fong Pak Lun (penalty missed); Díaz (penalty scored); Barry (penalty missed); Moses (penalty scored)		(penalty scored) Nakamura; (penalty scored) Itaparica; (penalty missed) Russell; (penalty scored) Mora; (penalty scored) Sealy
