= Lai Ka Fai =

Hong Kong footballer

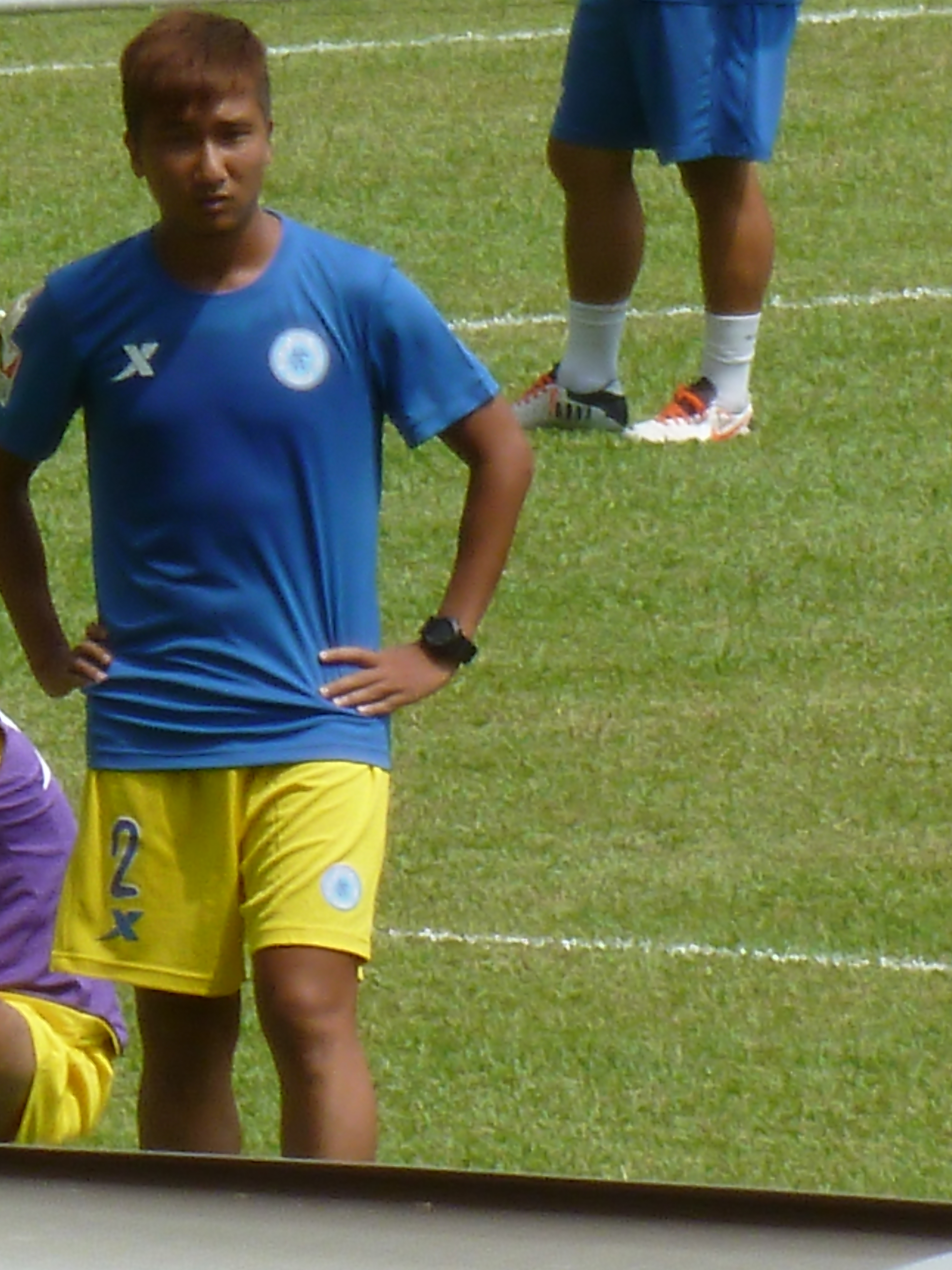

Personal information
- Full name: Lai Ka Fai
- Date of birth: 30 May 1983 (age 43)
- Place of birth: Hong Kong
- Height: 1.65 m (5 ft 5 in)
- Position: Defender

Youth career
- Double Flower

Senior career*
Years	Team	Apps	(Gls)
2000–2002	Double Flower		
2002–2004	Hong Kong Rangers	14	(0)
2004–2007	Citizen	33	(0)
2007–2008	Hong Kong Rangers	11	(0)
2008–2011	Sun Hei	39	(0)
2011–2012	Fukien	17	(6)
2012–2013	Mutual	24	(6)
2013–2014	Hong Kong Rangers	3	(0)
2016–2018	Eastern District	34	(0)
2018–2019	Wong Tai Sin	37	(0)
2018–2019	Ravia		

International career
- Hong Kong U-23

Managerial career
- 2019–2023: Hong Kong Rangers
- 2023: Hong Kong Rangers (assistant coach)
- * Club domestic league appearances and goals as of 13 July 2013

Lai Ka Fai (Chinese: 賴嘉輝; Jyutping: laai^{6} gaa^{1} fai^{1} ; born 30 May 1983) is a former Hong Kong professional footballer who played as a defender.

== Club career ==
=== Sun Hei ===
On 2 June 2008, reports claimed that fellow First Division club Sun Hei was negotiating with Bulova Rangers for Lai's possible transfer. In July 2008, Lai joined Sun Hei for an undisclosed fee.

After the 2010–11 season, he left Sun Hei and joined newly-promotion First Division club Mutual. However, since Mutual refused promotion due to lack of sponsorship, Mutual was banned from Hong Kong league system for a season. Lai thus became a free agent.

=== Fukien ===
In the 2011–12 season, Lai joined Third 'A' Division club Fukien on a free transfer after being released by Mutual. He was appointed as the captain for the season. He scored a hat-trick against St. Joseph's on 20 November 2011, including two penalties.

=== Mutual ===
In July 2012, Lai rejoined Fourth Division club Mutual.

=== Rangers ===
On 8 June 2013, Lai joined First Division club Rangers for the third time on a free transfer.

== Career statistics ==
=== Club ===
As of 13 May 2013. Stats starting from the 2007–08 season.

Club	Season	Division	League		Senior Shield		League Cup		FA Cup		AFC Cup		Others^{1}		Total	
Club	Season	Division	Apps	Goals	Apps	Goals	Apps	Goals	Apps	Goals	Apps	Goals	Apps	Goals	Apps	Goals
Bulova Rangers	2007–08	First Division	11	0	1	0	2	0	0	0	N/A	N/A	N/A	N/A	14	0
Convoy Sun Hei	2008–09	First Division	13	0	1	0	3	0	0	0	N/A	N/A	N/A	N/A	17	0
Sun Hei	2009–10	First Division	13	0	2	0	—	—	1	0	N/A	N/A	N/A	N/A	16	0
Sun Hei	2010–11	First Division	13	0	0	0	1	0	2	0	N/A	N/A	N/A	N/A	16	0
Sun Hei Total			39	0	3	0	4	0	3	0	0	0	0	0	49	0
Fukien	2011–12	Third 'A' Division	17	6	1^{2}	0^{2}	N/A	N/A	N/A	N/A	N/A	N/A	N/A	N/A	18	6
Fukien Total			17	6	1	0	0	0	0	0	0	0	0	0	18	6
Mutual	2012–13	Fourth Division	24	6	2^{2}	0^{2}	N/A	N/A	N/A	N/A	N/A	N/A	N/A	N/A	26	6
Mutual Total			24	6	2	0	0	0	0	0	0	0	0	0	26	6
Rangers	2013–14	First Division	0	0	0	0	—	—	0	0	N/A	N/A	N/A	N/A	0	0
Rangers Total			11	0	1	0	2	0	0	0	0	0	0	0	14	0
Total			91	12	7	0	6	0	3	0	0	0	0	0	107	12

== Notes ==
1. Others include Hong Kong Third Division Champion Play-off.
2. Since these clubs were competing in lower divisions, they could only join the Junior Shield instead of Senior Shield.

== Honors ==
=== Club ===
Sun Hei

- Hong Kong League Cup (1): 2008–09
