= 2014–15 Hong Kong League Cup =

Tournament details
- Country: Hong Kong
- Teams: 9

Final positions
- Champions: Kitchee (4th title)
- Runners-up: South China

Tournament statistics
- Matches played: 17
- Goals scored: 54 (3.18 per match)
- Attendance: 15,174 (893 per match)

The 2014–15 Hong Kong League Cup is the 12th edition of the Hong Kong League Cup. The Cup is contested by the 9 teams in the 2014–15 Hong Kong Premier League.

== Results ==
=== Group stage ===
==== Group A ====
Pos	Team	Pld	W	D	L	GF	GA	GD	Pts	Qualification
1	South China	2	1	1	0	3	1	+2	4	Advance to semi-finals
2	I-Sky Yuen Long	2	1	1	0	2	1	+1	4	Advance to knock-out stage
3	YFCMD	2	0	0	2	2	5	−3	0	Advance to knock-out stage

Source: Hong Kong Football Association

22 October 2014 LC01	YFCMD	1–3	South China	Mong Kok, Kowloon
20:00 UTC+8	Ideguchi 43'	Report	Nakamura 25', 90'; Itaparica 50'	Stadium: Mong Kok Stadium; Attendance: 795; Referee: Liu Kwok Man

26 November 2014 LC04	I-Sky Yuen Long	2–1	YFCMD	Kowloon Bay, Kowloon
20:00 UTC+8	So Loi Keung 79'; Souza 90'	Report	Lau Hok Ming 76'	Stadium: Kowloon Bay Park; Attendance: 150; Referee: Ching Oi Cho

19 December 2014 LC07	South China	0–0	I-Sky Yuen Long	Kowloon Bay, Kowloon
20:00 UTC+8		Report		Stadium: Kowloon Bay Park; Attendance: 427; Referee: Luk Kin Sun

==== Group B ====
Pos	Team	Pld	W	D	L	GF	GA	GD	Pts	Qualification
1	Kitchee	2	2	0	0	12	1	+11	6	Advance to semi-finals
2	Biu Chun Rangers	2	1	0	1	3	8	−5	3	Advance to knock-out stage
3	Wofoo Tai Po	2	0	0	2	1	7	−6	0	Advance to knock-out stage

Source: Hong Kong Football Association

28 October 2014 LC02	Wofoo Tai Po	1–4	Kitchee	Mong Kok, Kowloon
20:00 UTC+8	So Yau Tin 89'	Report	Belencoso 7', 56', 65', 90+2'	Stadium: Mong Kok Stadium; Attendance: 497; Referee: Lau Fong Hei

3 December 2014 LC05	Biu Chun Rangers	3–0	Wofoo Tai Po	Kowloon Bay, Kowloon
20:00 UTC+8	Yago 18', 53'; Chuck Yiu Kwok 78'	Report		Stadium: Kowloon Bay Park; Attendance: 107; Referee: Ng Chiu Kok

20 December 2014 LC08	Kitchee	8–0	Biu Chun Rangers	Kowloon Bay, Kowloon
14:30 UTC+8	Paulinho 10', 11'; Belencoso 30', 62', 67', 77'; Cheung Kwok Ming 74'; Annan 89'	Report		Stadium: Kowloon Bay Park; Attendance: 470; Referee: Lau Fong Hei

==== Group C ====
Pos	Team	Pld	W	D	L	GF	GA	GD	Pts	Qualification
1	Sun Pegasus	2	1	1	0	4	3	+1	4	Advance to semi-finals
2	Eastern	2	1	1	0	3	2	+1	4	Advance to knock-out stage
3	Wong Tai Sin	2	0	0	2	3	5	−2	0	Advance to knock-out stage

Source: Hong Kong Football Association

5 November 2014 LC03	Wong Tai Sin	2–3	Sun Pegasus	Mong Kok, Kowloon
20:00 UTC+8	Wong Chun Hin 42'; Campion 90+2' (o.g.)	Report	Festus 24'; Ranđelović 34', 67'	Stadium: Mong Kok Stadium; Attendance: 620; Referee: Lau Fong Hei

10 December 2014 LC06	Eastern	2–1	Wong Tai Sin	Kowloon Bay, Kowloon
20:00 UTC+8	Giovane 53'; Tse Man Wing 86'	Report	Liu Pui Fung 65'	Stadium: Kowloon Bay Park; Attendance: 451; Referee: Tang Hing Fu

21 December 2014 LC09	Sun Pegasus	1–1	Eastern	Tseung Kwan O, New Territories
14:30 UTC+8	Raščić 9' (pen.)	Report	Macallister 84'	Stadium: Tseung Kwan O Sports Ground; Attendance: 1,146; Referee: Liu Kwok Man

=== Knock-out Stage ===
7 January 2015 LC10	I-Sky Yuen Long	2–0	Biu Chun Rangers	Kowloon Bay, Kowloon
20:00 UTC+8	Souza 83', 88'	Report		Stadium: Kowloon Bay Park; Attendance: 151; Referee: Tang Hing Fu

21 January 2015 LC11	Wong Tai Sin	2–1	Wofoo Tai Po	Kowloon Bay, Kowloon
20:00 UTC+8	Yoon Dong Hun 9' (pen.); Liu Pui Fung 23'	Report	Chan Lap Ming 7'	Stadium: Kowloon Bay Park; Attendance: 202; Referee: Chan Ming Siu

31 January 2015 LC12	Eastern	3–0	I-Sky Yuen Long	Kowloon Bay, Kowloon
14:30 UTC+8	Ricketts 27'; Lee Chi Ho 37'; Giovane 40'	Report		Stadium: Kowloon Bay Park; Attendance: 642; Referee: Ng Chiu Kok

1 February 2015 LC13	YFCMD	0–1 (a.e.t.)	Wong Tai Sin	Kowloon Bay, Kowloon
14:30 UTC+8		Report	Chan Cheuk Kwong 120+2'	Stadium: Kowloon Bay Park; Attendance: 337; Referee: Tong Kui Sum

15 February 2015 LC14	Eastern	1–1 (a.e.t.) (2–4 p)	Wong Tai Sin	Kowloon Bay, Kowloon
14:30 UTC+8	Giovane 9'	Report	Sandro 11'	Stadium: Kowloon Bay Park; Attendance: 726; Referee: Ng Chiu Kok
	Penalties
	(penalty missed) (penalty missed); Kilama (penalty scored); Ricketts (penalty scored)		(penalty scored) Sandro; (penalty scored) Yoon Dong Hun (penalty missed); (penalty scored) Tomas; (penalty scored) Yeung Chi Lun

=== Semi-finals ===
21 March 2015 LC15	South China	2–1	Sun Pegasus	Mong Kok, Kowloon
14:30 UTC+8	Chan Siu Ki 70'; Nakamura 90+4'	Report	McKee 35'	Stadium: Mong Kok Stadium; Attendance: 2,342; Referee: Tong Kui Sum

22 March 2015 LC16	Wong Tai Sin	0–1	Kitchee	Mong Kok, Kowloon
17:30 UTC+8		Report	Lo Kwan Yee 37'	Stadium: Mong Kok Stadium; Attendance: 1,031; Referee: Chan Ming Siu

=== Final ===
22 April 2015 LC17	South China	0–4	Kitchee	Mong Kok, Kowloon
20:00 UTC+8		Report	Paulinho 5', 12'; Belencoso 77'; Jordi 90+6'	Stadium: Mong Kok Stadium; Attendance: 5,082; Referee: Tong Kui Sum
