= 2014–15 Hong Kong FA Cup =

Tournament details
- Country: Hong Kong
- Teams: 13

Final positions
- Champions: Kitchee (3rd title)
- Runners-up: Eastern

Tournament statistics
- Matches played: 12
- Goals scored: 39 (3.25 per match)
- Attendance: 13,433 (1,119 per match)

The 2014–15 Hong Kong FA Cup was the 41st season of Hong Kong FA Cup. It was a knockout competition for all the teams of the 2014–15 Hong Kong Premier League. Unlike the previous season, the format changed back into a single-legged competition.

It was once again feature lower division. 4 teams from the preliminary round were qualified for the proper round.

The winner guaranteed a place in the 2014–15 Hong Kong season play-off.

== Preliminary round ==
Teams that qualified for the proper round:

- Yau Tsim Mong
- Shatin
- Southern
- Citizen

== Fixtures and results ==
=== First round ===
First round features six teams from the Premier League and the four semi finalists from the Preliminary Round.

27 February 2015	Yau Tsim Mong (3)	2–4	Tai Po (1)	Kowloon Bay, Kowloon
20:00 (UTC+8)	Wong Chui Shing 39'; Chan Yiu Lun 75' (pen.)	Report	Sales 5', 30', 77'; Hon Shing 49' (o.g.)	Stadium: Kowloon Bay Park (Capacity: 1,200); Attendance: 359; Referee: Luk Kin San

28 February 2015	Yuen Long (1)	4–1	Shatin (3)	Yuen Long, New Territories
14:30 (UTC+8)	Souza 24', 39'; Reinaldo 90'; Yoshitake 90+5'	Report	Li Ling Fung 7'	Stadium: Yuen Long Stadium (Capacity: 4,932); Attendance: 299; Referee: Tang Hing Fuk

28 February 2015	YFCMD (1)	1–1 (a.e.t.) (5–4 p)	Pegasus (1)	Kowloon Bay, Kowloon
17:30 (UTC+8)	Fukuda 69'	Report	Tokic 75'	Stadium: Kowloon Bay Park (Capacity: 1,200); Attendance: 387; Referee: Tong Kui Sum
	Penalties
	Tan Chun Lok (penalty scored); Rubén (penalty scored); Fernando (penalty scored); Mensah (penalty scored); Lee Ka Ho (penalty scored)		(penalty scored) Ju Yingzhi; (penalty scored) Tong Kin Man; (penalty scored) Deng Jinghuang; (penalty scored) Miović

1 March 2015	Wong Tai Sin (1)	2–0	Southern (2)	Tsing Yi
14:30 (UTC+8)	Li Jian 46'; Sandro 79'	Report		Stadium: Tsing Yi Sports Ground (Capacity: 1,500); Attendance: 294; Referee: Ho Wai Sing

1 March 2015	South China (1)	1–0	Citizen (2)	Kowloon Bay, Kowloon
17:30 (UTC+8)	McBreen 45+1'	Report		Stadium: Kowloon Bay Park (Capacity: 1,200); Attendance: 653; Referee: Chan Ming Siu

=== Quarter-finals ===
11 April 2015	Kitchee (1)	3–1	Tai Po (1)	Mong Kok, Kowloon
14:30 (UTC+8)	Rubiato 42'; Wan 60'; Annan 78'	Report	Aender 70'	Stadium: Mong Kok Stadium; Referee: Chan Ming Siu

11 April 2015	Yuen Long (1)	1–3	YFCMD (1)	Tseung Kwan O, New Territories
17:30 (UTC+8)	Souza 66'	Report	Díaz 21'; Fukuda 51'; Fernando 90+3'	Stadium: Tseung Kwan O Sports Ground; Attendance: 267; Referee: Liu Kwok Man

12 April 2015	Eastern (1)	5–3 (a.e.t.)	Wong Tai Sin (1)	Mong Kok, New Territories
14:30 (UTC+8)	Giovane 15' (pen.), 41', 120+1'; Diego 78'; Tse Man Wing 111'	Report	Zhang Jun 39'; Yoon Dong-hun 59' (pen.); Fu Shu Sing 71'	Stadium: Mong Kok Stadium; Attendance: 1,177; Referee: Ng Chiu Kok

12 April 2015	Rangers (1)	1–3	South China (1)	Tseung Kwan O, New Territories
17:30 (UTC+8)	Lai Hau Hei 17'	Report	Lo Kong Wai 52'; Chan Wai Ho 62'; Chan Siu Ki 77'	Stadium: Tseung Kwan O Sports Ground; Attendance: 682; Referee: Lau Fong Hei

=== Semi-finals ===
25 April 2015	Kitchee (1)	0–0 (a.e.t.) (5–4 p)	YFCMD (1)	Mong Kok, New Territories
15:00 (UTC+8)		Report		Stadium: Mong Kok Stadium; Attendance: 1,211; Referee: Ho Wai Sing
	Penalties
	Belencoso (penalty scored); Paulinho (penalty scored); Wan (penalty scored); Jordi (penalty scored); Tsang Kam To (penalty scored)		(penalty scored) Fong Pak Lun (penalty missed); (penalty scored) Díaz; (penalty scored) Moses; (penalty scored) Fernando

26 April 2015	Eastern (1)	1–0	South China (1)	Mong Kok, New Territories
15:00 (UTC+8)	Nägelein 86'	Report		Stadium: Mong Kok Stadium; Attendance: 3,233; Referee: Liu Kwok Man

=== Final ===
17 May 2015	Kitchee (1)	2–0 (a.e.t.)	Eastern (1)	Mong Kok, New Territories
15:00 (UTC+8)	Belencoso 100', 116'	Report		Stadium: Mong Kok Stadium; Attendance: 4,348; Referee: Ng Chiu Kok
