= Lai Hau Hei =

Hong Kong footballer

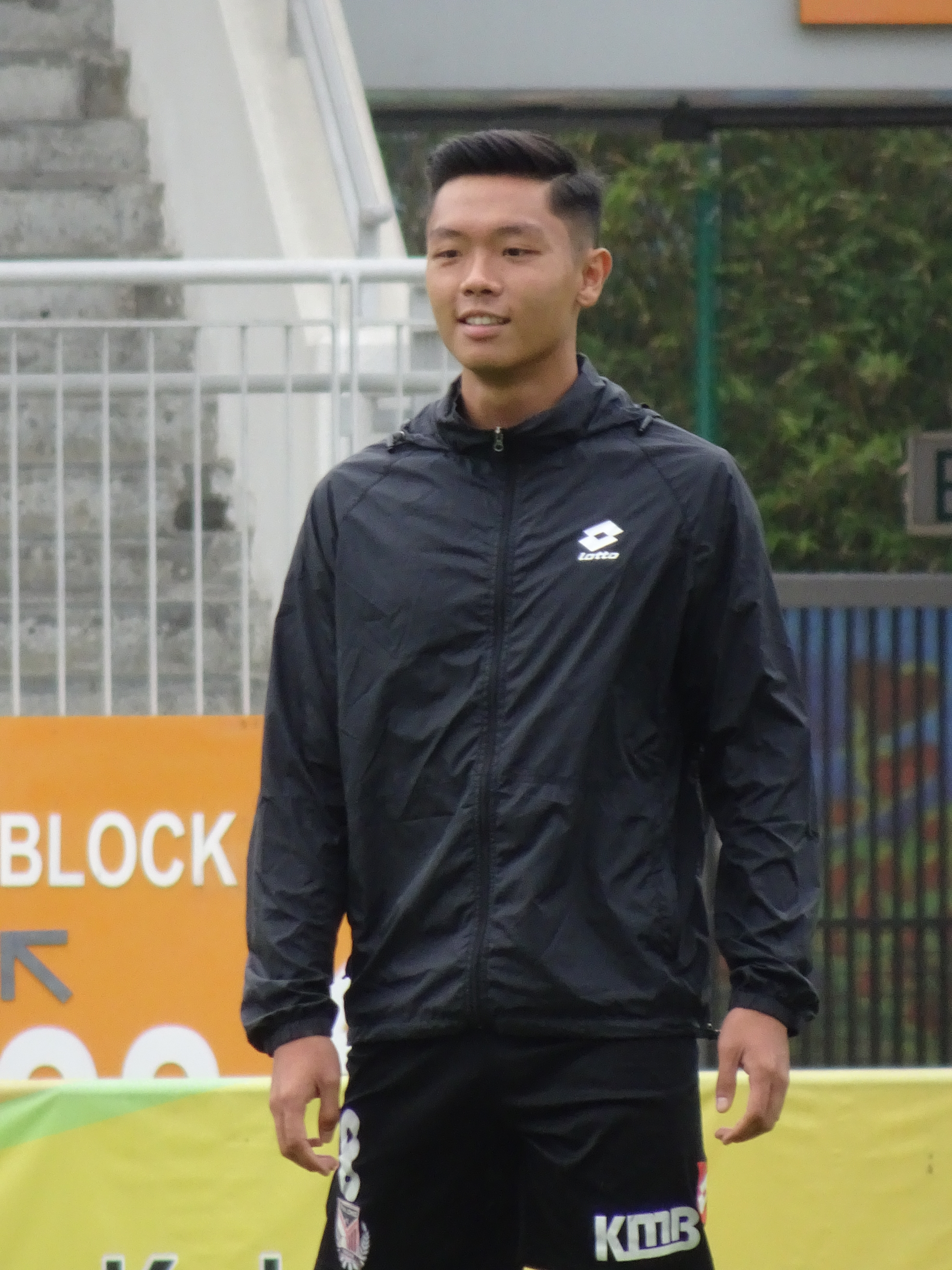

Personal information
- Full name: Lai Hau Hei
- Date of birth: 19 January 1995 (age 31)
- Place of birth: Hong Kong
- Height: 1.82 m (5 ft 11 1/2 in)
- Positions: Midfielder; defender

Youth career
- 2011–2012: Pegasus

Senior career*
Years	Team	Apps	(Gls)
2012–2015	Hong Kong Rangers	17	(1)
2015–2017	Yuen Long	14	(0)
2017–2019	Dreams	23	(0)
2019–2020	Yuen Long	4	(0)
2020–2021	Icanfield	11	(0)
2021–2023	Happy Valley	30	(5)

International career^{‡}
2012–2013	Hong Kong U-18	8	(2)
2015–2016	Hong Kong U-21	2	(0)
2017	Hong Kong U-22	3	(0)
- * Club domestic league appearances and goals as of 16 September 2021 ‡ National team caps and goals as of 23 July 2017

Lai Hau Hei (Chinese: 黎厚希; born 19 January 1995 in Hong Kong) is a former Hong Kong professional footballer.

== Early life ==
Lai was born and raised in Yuen Long, an area in the northwest of Hong Kong.

== Club career ==
During his youth, Lai trained in football with Pegasus which were then based on Tin Shui Wai.

Lai was offered his first contract in professional football by Rangers with whom he signed with in 2012. Lau made his professional debut on 2 September 2012 in a 5–1 Senior Shield loss to Citizen. He scored his first professional goal on 13 April 2015 in the 2014–15 Hong Kong FA Cup win over South China.

In 2015, Lai joined his home district club of Yuen Long.

In July 2017, it was announced that Lai had moved to Dreams.

On 7 August 2019, it was revealed that Lai had rejoined Yuen Long.

On 16 September 2021, First Division side Happy Valley announced Lau as a player.

== International career ==
In 2016, Lai was selected to the Hong Kong U-21 squad to play in an exhibition tournament in Singapore.

In 2017, he was on the Hong Kong U-22 squad which travelled to North Korea for the 2018 AFC U-23 Championship qualification group stage. He appeared in all three of Hong Kong's matches.
