= Ivan Razumović =

Croatian footballer

Personal information
- Full name: Ivan Razumović
- Date of birth: 27 July 1985 (age 41)
- Place of birth: Osijek, SR Croatia, SFR Yugoslavia
- Height: 1.80 m (5 ft 11 in)
- Positions: Defender; defensive midfielder

Youth career
- NK Belisce

Senior career*
Years	Team	Apps	(Gls)
2004–2006	Valpovka	72	(2)
2007	FC Kőnigsbrunn	8	(0)
2007	Vidima-Rakovski Sevlievo		
2008–2009	Belišće	54	(4)
2010	Hamilton Croatia	22	(2)
2010–2011	Belišće	12	(0)
2011–2012	Ǣgir	32	(2)
2012–2013	Persiraja Banda Aceh		
2013–2014	Hong Kong Rangers	1	(0)
2014–2016	Medkila	49	(2)
2017-2019	Lillehammer	64	(8)
- * Club domestic league appearances and goals

Ivan Razumović (born 27 July 1985) is a Croatian footballer who played with various clubs in Europe, and had stints overseas in North America and Asia.

== Career ==
Razumovic began his career in his native Croatia with NK Belišće, and played in the lower German league with FC Konigsbrunn. In 2006, he signed with PFC Vidima-Rakovski Sevlievo of the Bulgarian Second Professional Football League, where he helped team secure a promotion to the Bulgarian A Football Group. In 2008, he returned to Croatia to sign with NK Belišće of the Croatian Second Football League. After the relegation of NK Belisce he went overseas to Canada to sign with Hamilton Croatia of the Canadian Soccer League. He made his debut for the club on 15 May 2010, in a match against TFC Academy. He helped Hamilton finish third in the overall standings, and clinched a postseason berth for the club. In the quarterfinal series against TFC Academy he scored a goal in a 2–1 victory which advanced the club to the semi-finals, and subsequently to the CSL Championship finals. In the finals Hamilton faced Brantford Galaxy, but were defeated by a score of 3–0.

In 2011, he returned to NK Belišće, and the following season he went to Iceland to sign with Ǣgir FC of the 2. deild karla. In 2012, he went overseas to Indonesia to sign with Persiraja Banda Aceh, and the following year he signed with Hong Kong Rangers FC. In 2014, he returned to Europe to sign with Medkila IL, where he appeared in 49 matches and scored two goal.

On 24 February 2017, Razumović signed a contract with Lillehammer FK.
