= Marco Wegener =

Hong Kong footballer

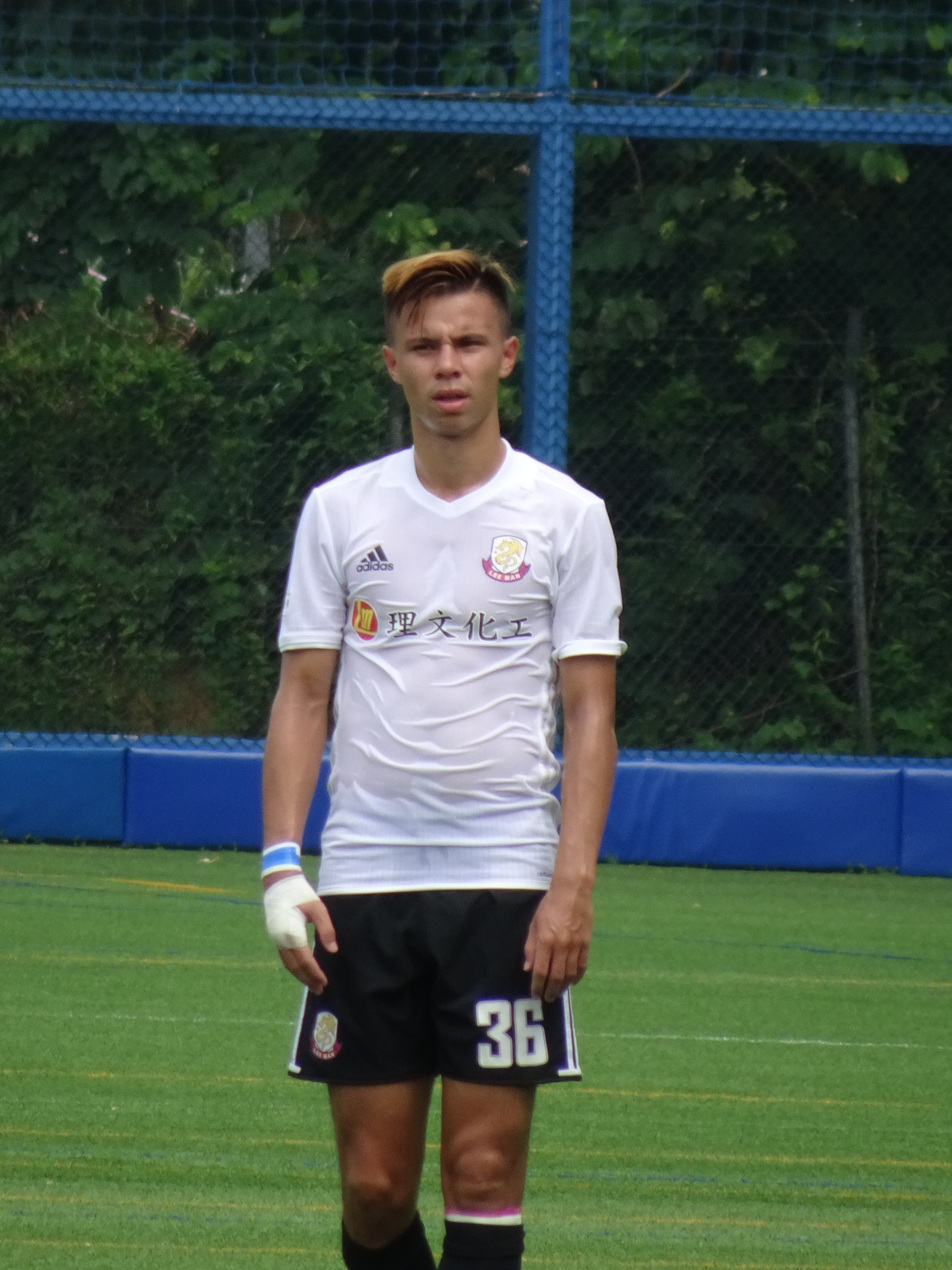

Personal information
- Full name: Marco Wegener
- Date of birth: 15 August 1995 (age 31)
- Place of birth: Hong Kong
- Height: 1.76 m (5 ft 9 in)
- Positions: Defender; midfielder

Youth career
- 2011–2013: Rangers (HKG)

Senior career*
Years	Team	Apps	(Gls)
2013–2017	Rangers (HKG)	19	(0)
2017–2018	Lee Man	12	(0)
2018–2019	Kui Tan		
2019–2020	Tsun Tat		
2022–2023	Rangers (HKG)	8	(0)
2023–2025	North District	34	(0)
2025–2026	Rangers (HKG)	12	(0)

International career^{‡}
2013	Hong Kong U19	8	(1)
2015	Hong Kong U20	2	(0)
- * Club domestic league appearances and goals as of 16 May 2026 ‡ National team caps and goals as of 21 March 2016

Marco Wegener (Chinese: 韋健豪; born 15 August 1995) is a Hong Kong professional footballer who plays as a defender.

== Youth career ==
Wegener played his high school football at La Salle College. In 2011, he scored the lone goal in a 1–0 victory over Diocesan Boys' School in the Hong Kong Inter-School Football Competition quarterfinals.

== Club career ==
In 2014, Wegener graduated to the first team of Rangers, making his debut in a 4–1 loss to Dreams Metro Gallery. He trains with the first team while completing his associate degree at the Hong Kong Polytechnic University.

On 5 August 2017, Wegener was announced as a player for Lee Man.

On 24 July 2018, Hoi King confirmed the trial of Wegener. In the end, the player elected not to sign with the club in order to continue his university education in Australia.

On 10 September 2022, Wegener returned to Rangers after 5 years.

On 17 July 2023, Wegener joined North District.

On 25 July 2025, Wegener rejoined Rangers.

== International career ==
Wegener received his first call-up to the Hong Kong under-19 team during the 2014 AFC U-19 Championship qualification. On 15 July 2016, he was selected to the Hong Kong under-20 squad for the under-21 National Quadrangular Football Tournament in Singapore.

== Personal life ==
Wegener's father is German while his mother is a Hong Konger. He was a flag bearer for the 2006 FIFA World Cup quarter final match between Germany and Argentina.
