= Itaparica (footballer) =

Hong Kong footballer (born 1980)

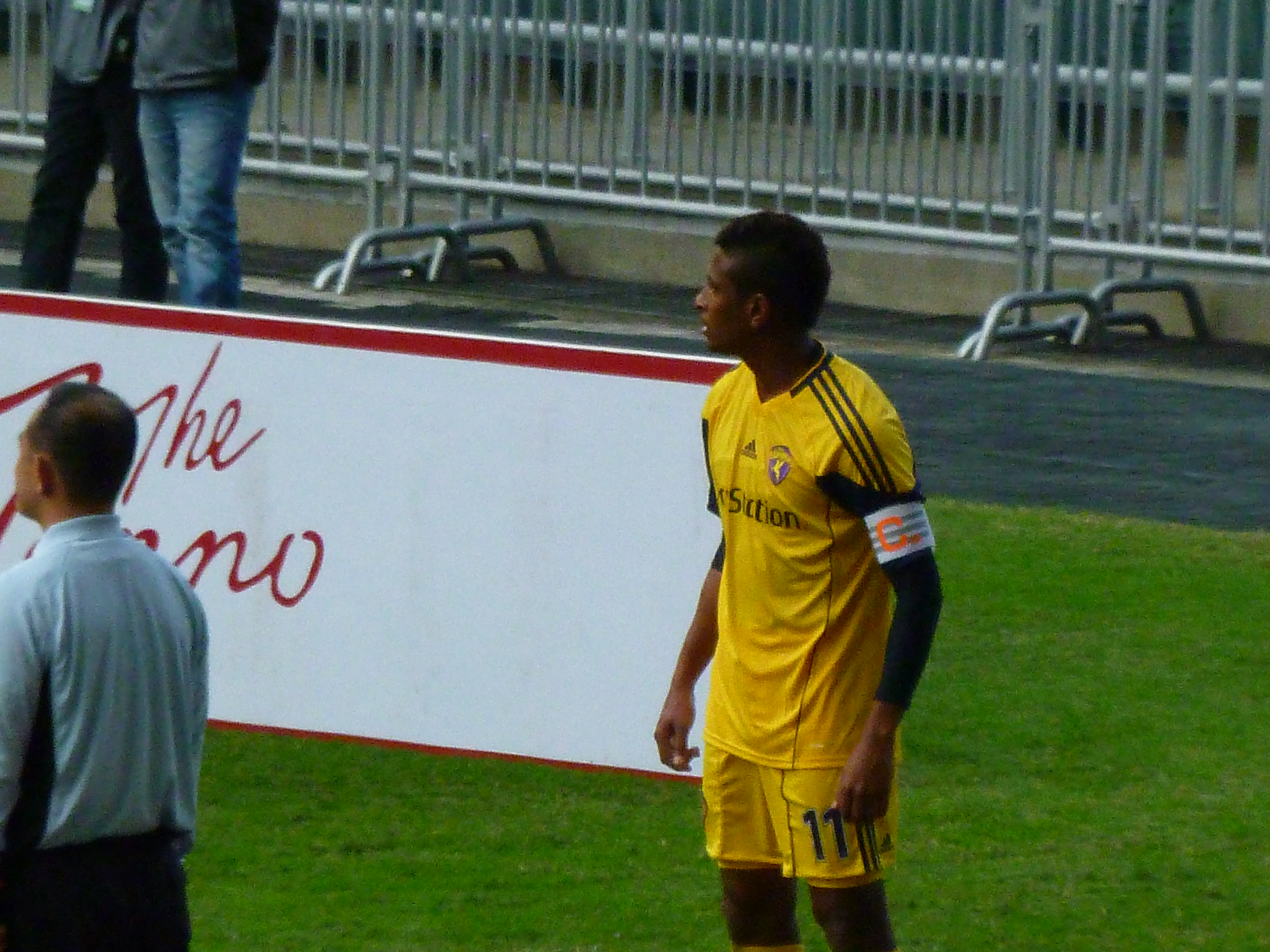
- Itaparica in 2011

Personal information
- Full name: Manoel dos Santos Filho
- Date of birth: 8 July 1980 (age 46)
- Place of birth: Itaparica, Bahia, Brazil
- Height: 1.82 m (6 ft 0 in)
- Position: Attacking midfielder

Senior career*
Years	Team	Apps	(Gls)
1999	Brasília		
2000	XV de Caraguatatuba		
2001	Fraiburgo		
2002	Tupã		
2002–2003	Cruzeiro	1	(0)
2004	Portuguesa Santista		
2004	Anapolina		
2005	Portuguesa Santista		
2005	São Bento		
2005	Avaí		
2006	Anapolina		
2006–2007	Paysandu		
2007	→ Brusque (loan)		
2007–2008	South China	15	(3)
2008–2012	→ Pegasus (loan)	69	(43)
2012–2013	South China	17	(11)
2013–2014	Eastern	16	(4)
2014–2015	South China	19	(9)
2016	Xinjiang Tianshan Leopard	27	(7)
2016–2017	Tai Po	8	(1)
2017–2019	R&F	34	(6)

International career
2016–2017	Hong Kong	8	(1)
- * Club domestic league appearances and goals

Manoel dos Santos Filho (Chinese: 伊達; born 8 July 1980), commonly known as Itaparica, is a former professional footballer who played as an attacking midfielder. Born in Brazil, he represented Hong Kong internationally.

== Club career ==
=== South China ===
Itaparica played in Campeonato Brasileiro Série A for several clubs, including Cruzeiro, Avai and Portuguesa. He joined South China and made his debut for the team on the away league game against Lanwa Redbull on 15 September 2007, where the team won by 3–1. He scored his first goal for the team in the league match against Workable on 26 September 2007, where the team won by 6–1.

=== Pegasus ===
After the 2009–10 season, Itaparica was a top scorer in Hong Kong for three consecutive seasons. It was a notable achievement considering he played most of the time as an attacking midfielder for TSW Pegasus. He was able to score in all the competitions he played in with an scoring percentage of nearly 60%. Due to his performance he was named 'Hong Kong Best Eleven' in last 3 seasons.

=== South China ===
In the 2012–13 season, Itaparica rejoined South China.

=== Eastern ===
On 11 June 2013, Eastern Salon announced their 22-men squad for the following season. Itaparica joined them after South China opted not to extend his contract.

=== South China ===
Itaparica rejoins South China for the third time in summer 2014.

=== Tai Po ===
After a season with China League One club Xinjiang Tianshan Leopard, Itaparica decided to return to Hong Kong. He signed with HKPL side Tai Po on 30 December 2016. On 18 March, Itaparica collided with a Southern player during a Premier League match. He sprained his right knee and was subsequently ruled out for six weeks. He returned in time for Tai Po's Sapling Cup Final match against Pegasus on 3 May during which he won his first trophy since returning to Hong Kong.

=== R&F ===
In July 2017, the South China Morning Post reported that Itaparica would join R&F.

On 19 June 2019, head coach Yeung Ching Kwong revealed that Itaparica would not be retained. He announced his retirement from football after the season on 30 August 2019 and returned to Brazil in November of the same year.

== International career ==
Itaparica was born and raised in Brazil. In September 2014, Itaparica applied for the HKSAR passport and was granted one on 4 November 2015. As a result, he became eligible to play for the Hong Kong national team. On 31 December 2015, he earned his first cap for the national team during the 38th Guangdong–Hong Kong Cup, an unofficial tournament.

On 3 January 2016, Itaparica scored his first goal for the national team. He made his formal debut for Hong Kong in a FIFA World Cup qualifying 2-0 loss against Qatar in March of that year.

On 24 March 2016, Itaparica made his international debut for Hong Kong in the 2018 FIFA World Cup qualifiers against Qatar.

== Career statistics ==
=== Club ===
As of 14 July 2017

Appearances and goals by club, season and competition
Club	Season	League		Season play-off		Senior Shield		League Cup		FA Cup		Sapling Cup		AFC Cup		Total	
Club	Season	Apps	Goals	Apps	Goals	Apps	Goals	Apps	Goals	Apps	Goals	Apps	Goals	Apps	Goals	Apps	Goals
South China	2007–08	13 (2)	3			1 (1)	0	4 (2)	1	2 (0)	1					20 (5)	5
TSW Pegasus	2008–09	19 (0)	8			4 (0)	4	4 (0)	1	4 (0)	3					31 (0)	16
TSW Pegasus	2009–10	17 (1)	13			2 (0)	1	0 (0)	0	2 (0)	4					21 (1)	18
TSW Pegasus	2010–11	16 (2)	11			1 (0)	0	3 (0)	2	2 (0)	4			6	2	28 (2)	19
TSW Pegasus	2011–12	14 (0)	11			6 (0)	4	1 (0)	0	0 (0)	0					21 (0)	15
South China	2012–13	17 (0)	11			3 (1)	1			2 (1)	1					22 (2)	13
Eastern	2013–14	13 (3)	4			3 (0)	0			1 (2)	0					17 (5)	4
South China	2014–15	12 (1)	4	2 (0)	0	0 (1)	0	2 (1)	1	2 (0)	0					18 (3)	5
South China	2015–16	4 (2)	3			0 (0)	0	2 (0)	1	0 (0)	0	1 (0)	0			7 (2)	4
Tai Po	2016–17	8 (0)	1			0 (0)	0	0 (0)	0	0 (0)	0	4 (0)	0			12 (0)	1
R&F	2017–18	0 (0)	0			0 (0)	0	0 (0)	0	0 (0)	0	0 (0)	0			0 (0)	0
All		144	68	2	0	23	10	19	6	18	13	5	0	6	2	217	100

=== International ===
As of 5 October 2017

National team	Year	Apps	Goals
Hong Kong	2016	5	1
Hong Kong	2017	3	0
Total		8	1

As of match played 1 September 2016

International goals by date, venue, cap, opponent, score, result and competition
No.	Date	Venue	Cap	Opponent	Score	Result	Competition
1	1 September 2016	Mong Kok Stadium, Mong Kok, Hong Kong	4	Cambodia	2–1	4–2	Friendly

== Honours ==
Pegasus

- Hong Kong FA Cup: 2009–10

South China

- Hong Kong First League: 2012–13

Eastern

- Hong Kong FA Cup: 2013–14

Tai Po

- Hong Kong Sapling Cup: 2016–17

Awards and achievements
Preceded by Vacant	Hong Kong Football Association; Best Eleven of the year 2008–09, 2009–10, 2010–11	Succeeded by Vacant
Preceded by Giovane Alves Da Silva	Hong Kong Football Association; Top Scorer; 2009–10, 2010–11	Succeeded by Vacant
Preceded by Lee Wai Lim	Hong Kong FA Cup; Player of the Tournament; 2009–10	Succeeded by Vacant
Preceded by Paulinho Piracicaba	Hong Kong Senior Shield; Top Scorer; 2011–12	Succeeded by Incumbent
