= Nguyễn Hải An =

Vietnamese footballer

Personal information
- Full name: Nguyễn Hải An
- Date of birth: 15 June 1988 (age 38)
- Place of birth: Mê Linh, Hanoi, Vietnam
- Height: 1.67 m (5 ft 6 in)
- Position: Midfielder

Youth career
- 2003–2010: Hà Nội T&T

Senior career*
Years	Team	Apps	(Gls)
2011–2017	Hà Nội T&T	19	(0)
2018–2022	Đồng Tháp	23	(2)
- * Club domestic league appearances and goals as of 18 September 2016

Nguyễn Hải An (born 15 June 1988) is a Vietnamese footballer who plays as a midfielder for V.League 2 club Đồng Tháp.

== Honours ==
=== Clubs ===
Hà Nội F.C.

- V.League 1

(gold) Winners : 2013, 2016
(silver) Runners-up : 2011, 2012, 2014, 2015
(bronze) Third place : 2017

- Vietnamese Super Cup

(silver) Runners-up : 2013, 2015, 2016

- Vietnamese National Cup

(silver) Runners-up : 2012, 2015, 2016

- AFC Cup :

Quarter-finals 2014 AFC Cup
