= Chuck Yiu Kwok =

Hong Kong footballer

Chuck Yiu Kwok 卓耀國
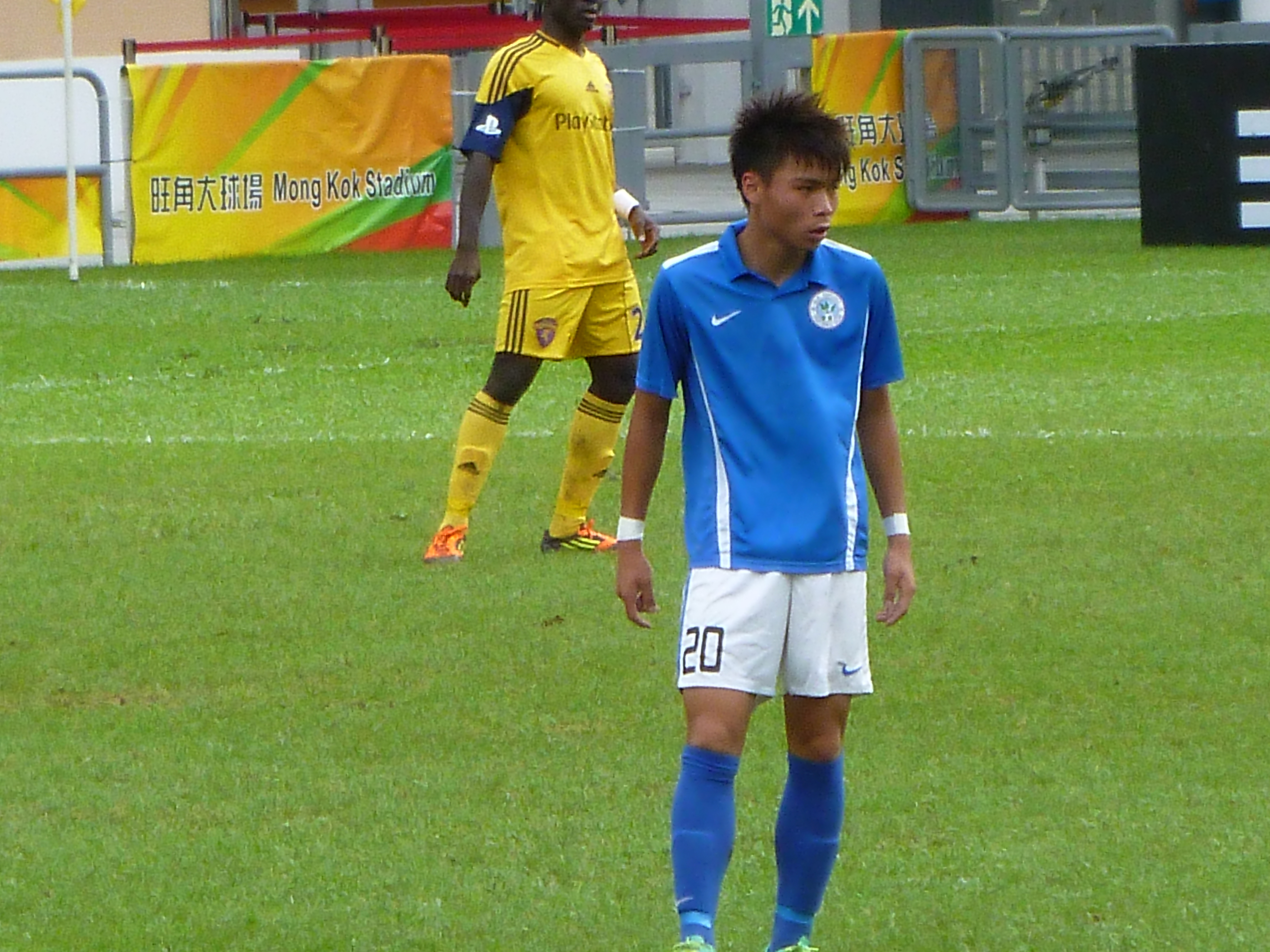

Personal information
- Full name: Tommy Chuck Yiu Kwok
- Date of birth: 29 May 1994 (age 32)
- Place of birth: Tsuen Wan, Hong Kong
- Height: 1.81 m (5 ft 11 in)
- Position: Forward

Youth career
- 2006–2009: Kitchee
- 2009–2012: Hong Kong Rangers

Senior career*
Years	Team	Apps	(Gls)
2011–2012	Fourway Rangers	1	(0)
2011–2012	→ HK Sapling (loan)	11	(2)
2012–2016	Hong Kong Rangers	43	(8)
2012–2013	→ Pegasus (loan)	6	(0)
2016–2017	R&F	17	(7)
2017–2018	Hong Kong Rangers	11	(3)
2018–2019	Chiasso	0	(0)
2019–2020	Yuen Long	4	(0)
2020–2021	Wong Tai Sin	2	(0)
2021–2023	Metro Gallery	4	(0)
2023–2024	Eastern District	5	(0)
2024–2025	Ravia		

International career
2010–2013	Hong Kong U-20	4	(0)
2014–2016	Hong Kong U-23	5	(0)
2016	Hong Kong	1	(0)
- * Club domestic league appearances and goals

Tommy Chuck Yiu Kwok (Chinese: 卓耀國; Cantonese Yale: Cheuk Yiuhgwok, born 29 May 1994) is a former Hong Kong professional footballer who played as a forward.

Being praised for his talent and hunger in scoring goals, Chuck ruined his career after returning from Switzerland due to personal affairs.

== Club career ==
In 2009, Chuck signed for Rangers when he was 15. During the 2013–14 season, he scored 7 goals to win the 2013-14 Best Youth Player award.

On 12 January 2016, Chuck scored his first goal of the 2015–16 Hong Kong Premier League campaign in a 2:0 win over Kitchee,

During the 2016–17 season, Chuck led R&F in scoring with seven goals. Despite this, he was not retained at the conclusion of the season.

On 27 June 2017, Chuck signed with Rangers. On 13 December 2017, Chuck was called up in the preliminary Hong Kong squad for the Guangdong-Hong Kong Cup in 2018. He received trial with China League One club Dalian Transcendence in January 2018. On 17 February 2018, it was announced that Chuck had terminated his contract with Rangers following much speculation about a move to the mainland China.

In March 2018, Chuck joined Swiss Challenge League club Chiasso. He left the club again at the end of 2018.

On 28 February 2019, Chuck signed a three-month contract with HKPL club Yuen Long. However, his registration was cancelled by the club in April due to personal issues.

== International career ==
On 6 June 2016, Chuck made his international debut for Hong Kong in a 2016 AYA Bank Cup match against Myanmar.

== Personal life ==
On 1 July 2019, Chuck was arrested by the Hong Kong Police on charges of tax evasion.

On 18 February 2021, Chuck was arrested again, this time on suspicion of illegal debt collection. The police have alleged that both he and his girlfriend have been involved in at least 16 debt collection activities between January and February 2021. The pair was reportedly arrested while splashing red paint outside a flat at Wah Fu Estate.

On 17 June 2021, the Kwun Tong Magistrates' Courts sentenced Chuck to 12 months probation after he pled agreed to guilty to criminal damage.

== Honours ==
=== Individual ===
- Best Young Player: 2014
