= Moses Mensah =

Ghanaian-born Hong Kong footballer (born 1978)

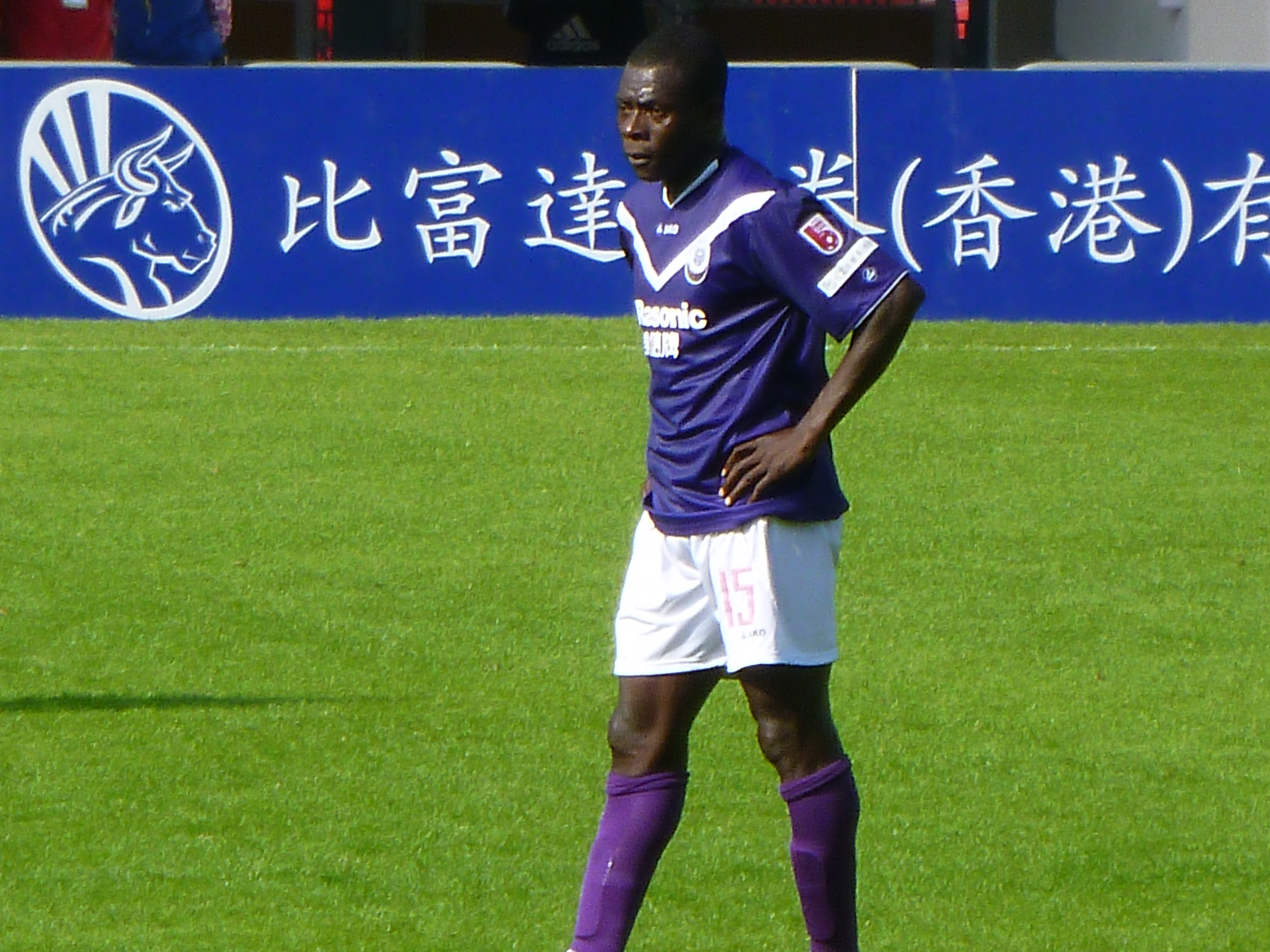
- Mensah in 2012

Personal information
- Date of birth: 10 August 1978 (age 48)
- Place of birth: Ghana
- Height: 1.72 m (5 ft 8 in)
- Position: Left-back

Senior career*
Years	Team	Apps	(Gls)
2003–2004	Kowloon City		
2004–2013	Citizen	88	(3)
2013–2014	Hong Kong Rangers	18	(1)
2014–2015	YFCMD	15	(0)
2015–2016	South China	0	(0)
2017–2019	Citizen	40	(1)
- * Club domestic league appearances and goals

Moses Mensah (Chinese: 摩西斯·文沙; born 10 August 1978) is a former professional footballer who played as a left-back.

== Club career ==
Mensah was born in Ghana. In 2003, he went to Hong Kong to join Hong Kong Third Division League club Kowloon City.

In 2004, Mensah signed for Hong Kong First Division League club Citizen. On 28 January 2011, Moses scored his first goal for Citizen against HKFC, which the match wins 3–1.

In 2012, after Mensah had lived in Hong Kong for over seven years, he became a Hong Kong local player.

In 2013, he became the first foreign player who played for Citizen for over seven years.

In 2013, Mensah signed for Hong Kong First Division League club Hong Kong Rangers. On 15 September 2013, he scored his first goal for Rangers against Yokohama FC Hong Kong, which the match won 3–2.

In November 2013, Mensah got the HKSAR passport.

In 2014, he signed for Hong Kong Premier League club YFCMD.

On 20 July 2015, he signed for Hong Kong Premier League club South China.
