= Ng Chiu Kok =

Hong Kong government official and football referee

吳超覺 CSDSM
- Ng Chiu Kok
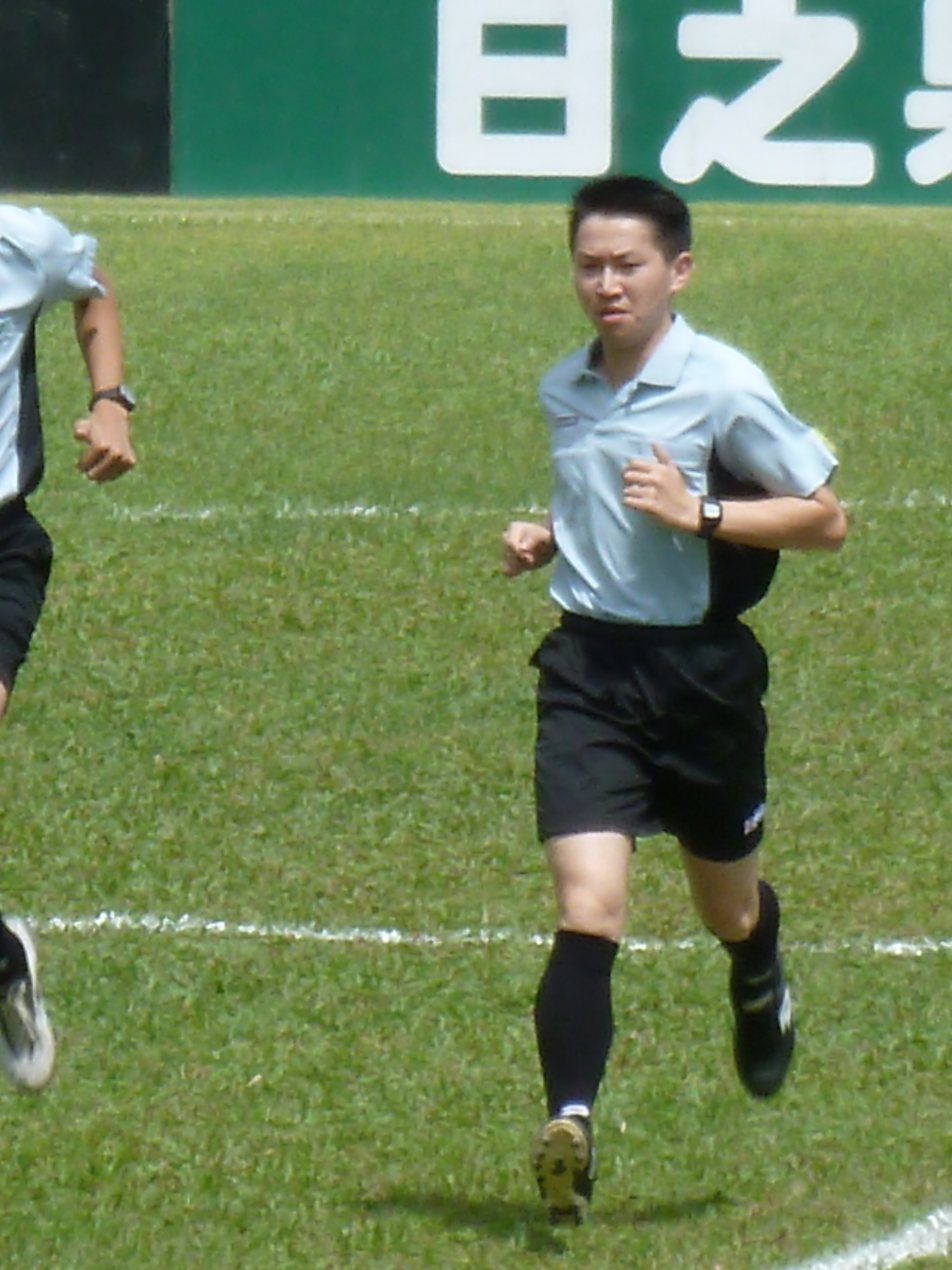

Deputy Commissioner of the Correctional Services Department
- Incumbent
- Assumed office March 2022

Personal details
- Born: 25 November 1975 (age 50) Hong Kong
- Occupation: Association football referee Civil servant
- Awards: 香港懲教事務卓越獎章 香港懲教事務長期服務獎章

Ng Chiu Kok, or Chiu-Kok Ng (Mandarin Chinese: 吳超覺, born 25 November 1975), born in Hong Kong, is the Deputy Commissioner of the Correctional Services Department of Hong Kong and an international Association football referee. He was a referee of the Hong Kong Football Association beginning in 1994. He started to officiate the highest level of professional league matches in Hong Kong in 2000. In 2004, he was promoted to FIFA referee. In 2008, he became the first Hong Kong referee to be promoted to the Asian Football Confederation elite referee. Ng has been voted the "Best Referee" of the year. On 30 May 2021, after officiating the final match of the Hong Kong Premier League and the relegation battle between Southern and Resources Capital, Ng announced that he would officially retire after officiating more than 1,100 games, ending his 27-year refereeing career.
