= 2013–14 Eastern SC season =

Eastern
2013–14 season
- Chairman: Lam Kin Ming
- Head Coach: Lee Kin Wo
- Ground: Shing Mun Valley Sports Ground (Capacity: 5,000)
- First Division: 3rd (alphabetically)
- Senior Shield: TBD
- FA Cup: TBD
Home colours	Away colours

The 2013–14 season was Eastern Sports Club's 59th season in the Hong Kong First Division League, as well as their debut season after their promotion to the top-tier division in 2012–13 season. The club has competed in the First Division League, as well as Senior Challenge Shield and FA Cup.

== Key events ==
- 26 May 2013: Brazilian striker Giovane Alves da Silva joins the club from fellow First Division club Biu Chun Rangers on a free transfer.
- 1 June 2013: Hong Kong defender Pak Wing Chak joins the club from fellow First Division club Sunray Cave JC Sun Hei for an undisclosed fee.
- 1 June 2013: Hong Kong striker Leung Tsz Chun joins the club from fellow First Division club Sunray Cave JC Sun Hei for an undisclosed fee.
- 2 June 2013: Hong Kong midfielder Lau Nim Yat joins the club from Biu Chun Rangers on a free transfer.
- 2 June 2013: Hong Kong goalkeeper Li Hon Ho joins the club from newly relegated Second Division club Wofoo Tai Po for free.
- 2 June 2013: Brazilian defender Clayton Michel Afonso joins the club from newly relegated Second Division club Wofoo Tai Po on a free transfer.
- 11 June 2013: The club announces the 22-men squad for the new season. Only Leung Chi Wing, Wong Chun Hin, Wong Chun Yue, Yiu Ho Ming, Lau Ho Lam and Wong Tsz Ho stay at the club.
- 11 June 2013: Hong Kong goalkeeper Chung Ho Yin and midfielder Lo Kai Wah confirm their retirement and will stay at the club for coaching work.
- 11 June 2013: Brazilian midfielder Diego Eli Moreira joins the club from fellow First Division club Tuen Mun on a free transfer.
- 11 June 2013: Hong Kong defender Wong Chin Hung joins the club from fellow First Division club Biu Chun Rangers for free.
- 11 June 2013: Brazilian midfielder Itaparica joins the club from fellow First Division club South China on a free. transfer
- 11 June 2013: Chinese-born Hongkonger midfielder Li Haiqiang joins the club from fellow First Division club Tuen Mun on a free transfer.
- 11 June 2013: Hong Kong midfielder Man Pei Tak joins the club from fellow First Division club South China on a free transfer.
- 11 June 2013: Hong Kong defender Tse Man Wing joins the club from fellow First Division club Royal Southern on a free transfer.
- 11 June 2013: Brazilian defender Beto joins the club from fellow First Division club Tuen Mun on a free transfer.
- 11 June 2013: Hong Kong defender Leung Kwok Wai joins the club from fellow First Division club Yokohama FC Hong Kong on a free transfer.
- 11 June 2013: Hong Kong defender Kwok Wing Sun joins the club from fellow First Division club Tuen Mun for an undisclosed fee.
- 11 June 2013: Brazilian goalkeeper Paulo César da Silva Argolo joins the club from Brazilian club Esporte Clube Novo Hamburgo on a free transfer.
- 19 June 2013: Neutralised Hong Kong former footballer Cristiano Cordeiro joins the club as an assistant coach.
- 19 June 2013: Hong Kong striker Cheng Siu Wai joins the club from fellow First Division club Kitchee for an undisclosed fee.
- 27 June 2013: The Hong Kong Football Association assigns Shing Mun Valley Sports Ground as Eastern Salon's home ground in the following season.
- 16 September 2013: Hong Kong defender Kwok Wing Sun and midfielder Wong Chun Hin joins fellow First Division club Sunray Cave JC Sun Hei on a season long loan.
- 1 January 2014: Hong Kong defender Wong Chi Chung joins the club from fellow First Division club Tuen Mun for an undisclosed fee.
- 1 January 2014: Hong Kong goalkeeper Leung Man Lai joins the club from fellow First Division club Happy Valley for an undisclosed fee.
- 1 January 2014: Hong Kong midfielder Li Ka Chun joins the club from fellow First Division club Biu Chun Rangers for an undisclosed fee.
- 3 January 2014: Hong Kong defender Lau Nim Yat is released by the club.
- 10 January 2014: Chinese striker Liang Zicheng joins the club from fellow First Division club Yokohama FC Hong Kong for a transfer fee of HKD$150,000.
- 13 January 2014: Australian striker Dylan Macallister joins the club from A-League clubn Melbourne Heart for an undisclosed fee.
- 17 January 2014: Hong Kong defender Pak Wing Chak leaves the club and join fellow First Division club Royal Southern on loan until the end of the season.

== Players ==
=== Squad information ===
N	P	Nat.	Name	Date of birth	Age	Since	Previous club	Notes
1	GK	(Brazil)	Paulo César da Silva Argolo^{FP}	27 March 1986	28	2013	(Brazil) Novo Hamburgo	
3	MF	(Brazil)	Diego Eli Moreira^{FP}	4 September 1988	25	2013	(Hong Kong) Tuen Mun	
4	DF	(Hong Kong)	Pak Wing Chak^{NR}	23 April 1990	24	2009	(Hong Kong) Sunray Cave JC Sun Hei	On loan to Royal Southern
5	DF	(Brazil)	Clayton Michel Afonso^{FP}	18 July 1988	25	2013	(Hong Kong) Wofoo Tai Po	
6	DF	(Hong Kong)	Wong Chin Hung^{LP}	2 March 1982	32	2013	(Hong Kong) Biu Chun Rangers	
7	MF	(Hong Kong)	Wong Chun Yue^{LP}	28 January 1978	36	2012	(Hong Kong) Sunray Cave JC Sun Hei	Team captain
8	MF	(Hong Kong)	Lee Sze Ming^{LP}	5 February 1979	35	2012	(Hong Kong) Double Flower	
9	FW	(Australia)	Dylan Macallister^{FP}	17 May 1982	32	2014 (Winter)	(Australia) Melbourne Heart	
10	MF	(Brazil)	Itaparica^{FP}	8 July 1980	33	2013	(Hong Kong) South China	
11	MF	(Hong Kong)	Li Haiqiang^{LP}	3 May 1977	37	2013	(Hong Kong) Tuen Mun	Second nationality: China
12	MF	(Hong Kong)	Man Pei Tak^{LP}	16 February 1982	32	2013	(Hong Kong) South China	
13	DF	(Hong Kong)	Tse Man Wing^{LP}	5 January 1983	31	2013	(Hong Kong) Royal Southern	
15	DF	(Brazil)	Beto^{FP}	10 July 1984	29	2013	(Hong Kong) Tuen Mun	
17	GK	(Hong Kong)	Li Hon Ho^{LP}	14 July 1986	27	2013	(Hong Kong) Wofoo Tai Po	
18	FW	(China)	Liang Zicheng^{LP}	18 March 1982	32	2014 (Winter)	Yokohama FC Hong Kong	Second nationality: Hong Kong
19	FW	(Hong Kong)	Cheng Siu Wai^{LP}	27 December 1981	32	2013	(Hong Kong) Kitchee	
20	MF	(Hong Kong)	Li Ka Chun^{LP}	10 September 1993	20	2014 (Winter)	(Hong Kong) Biu Chun Rangers	
21	MF	(Hong Kong)	Lau Ho Lam^{LP}			2012	Youth system	
22	FW	(Brazil)	Giovane Alves da Silva^{FP}	25 November 1982	31	2013	(Hong Kong) Biu Chun Rangers	
23	DF	(Hong Kong)	Leung Kwok Wai^{LP}	23 February 1986	28	2013	Yokohama FC Hong Kong	
26	FW	(Hong Kong)	Leung Tsz Chun^{LP}	19 May 1985	29	2013	(Hong Kong) Sunray Cave JC Sun Hei	
27	MF	(Hong Kong)	Yiu Ho Ming^{LP}	1 May 1995	19	2010	Youth system	
28	DF	(Hong Kong)	Wong Chi Chung^{LP}	11 October 1982	31	2014 (Winter)	(Hong Kong) Tuen Mun	
29	FW	(Hong Kong)	Yiu Hok Man^{LP}	9 February 1978	36	2012	(Hong Kong) Double Flower	
30	MF	(Hong Kong)	Wong Tsz Ho^{LP}	7 March 1994	20	2010	Youth system	
33	DF	(Hong Kong)	Leung Chi Wing^{LP}	29 April 1978	36	2012	(Hong Kong) Tai Chung	
36	GK	(Hong Kong)	Leung Man Lai^{LP}	16 January 1988	26	2014 (Winter)	(Hong Kong) Happy Valley	
	MF	(Hong Kong)	Wong Chun Hin^{NR}	9 July 1995	18	2009	Youth system	On loan to Sunray Cave JC Sun Hei
	DF	(Hong Kong)	Kwok Wing Sun^{NR}	11 September 1981	32	2013	(Hong Kong) Tuen Mun	On loan to Sunray Cave JC Sun Hei

Last update: 1 January 2014
Ordered by squad number.
^{LP}Local player; ^{FP}Foreign player; ^{NR}Non-registered player

=== Reserves ===
As of 11 June 2013

Note: Flags indicate national team as defined under FIFA eligibility rules; some limited exceptions apply. Players may hold more than one non-FIFA nationality.

No.	Pos.	Nation	Player
—	GK	HKG	Ng Tsz Hin
—	DF	HKG	Yu Pui Hong
—	DF	HKG	Leung Cheuk Yin
—	DF	HKG	Poon Kam Kit

No.	Pos.	Nation	Player
—	DF	HKG	Lee Ka Wah
—	MF	HKG	Hui Ka Lok
—	MF	HKG	Tse Long Hin

=== Transfers ===
==== In ====
#	Position	Player	Transferred from	Fee	Date	Team	Source
22	FW	(Brazil) Giovane Alves da Silva	(Hong Kong) Biu Chun Rangers	Free transfer	26 May 2013	First team	
4	DF	(Hong Kong) Pak Wing Chak	(Hong Kong) Sunray Cave JC Sun Hei	Free transfer	1 June 2013	First team	
26	FW	(Hong Kong) Leung Tsz Chun	(Hong Kong) Sunray Cave JC Sun Hei	Free transfer	1 June 2013	First team	
6	MF	(Hong Kong) Lau Nim Yat	(Hong Kong) Biu Chun Rangers	Free transfer	2 June 2013	First team	
17	GK	(Hong Kong) Li Hon Ho	(Hong Kong) Wofoo Tai Po	Free transfer	2 June 2013	First team	
5	DF	(Brazil) Clayton Michel Afonso	(Hong Kong) Wofoo Tai Po	Free transfer	2 June 2013	First team	
3	MF	(Brazil) Diego Eli Moreira	(Hong Kong) Tuen Mun	Free transfer	11 June 2013	First team	
2	DF	(Hong Kong) Wong Chin Hung	(Hong Kong) Biu Chun Rangers	Free transfer	11 June 2013	First team	
10	MF	(Brazil) Itaparica	(Hong Kong) South China	Free transfer	11 June 2013	First team	
11	MF	(Hong Kong) Li Haiqiang	(Hong Kong) Tuen Mun	Free transfer	11 June 2013	First team	
12	MF	(Hong Kong) Man Pei Tak	(Hong Kong) South China	Free transfer	11 June 2013	First team	
13	DF	(Hong Kong) Tse Man Wing	(Hong Kong) Royal Southern	Free transfer	11 June 2013	First team	
15	DF	(Brazil) Beto	(Hong Kong) Tuen Mun	Free transfer	11 June 2013	First team	
16	DF	(Hong Kong) Leung Kwok Wai	Yokohama FC Hong Kong	Free transfer	11 June 2013	First team	
18	DF	(Hong Kong) Kwok Wing Sun	(Hong Kong) Tuen Mun	Undisclosed	11 June 2013	First team	
1	GK	(Brazil) Paulo César da Silva Argolo	(Brazil) Novo Hamburgo	Free transfer	11 June 2013	First team	
14	FW	(Hong Kong) Cheng Siu Wai	(Hong Kong) Kitchee	Undisclosed	19 June 2013	First team	
28	DF	(Hong Kong) Wong Chi Chung	(Hong Kong) Tuen Mun	Undisclosed	1 January 2014	First team	
36	GK	(Hong Kong) Leung Man Lai	(Hong Kong) Happy Valley	Undisclosed	1 January 2014	First team	
20	MF	(Hong Kong) Li Ka Chun	(Hong Kong) Biu Chun Rangers	Undisclosed	1 January 2014	First team	
18	FW	(China) Liang Zicheng	Yokohama FC Hong Kong	$150,000	10 January 2014	First team	
9	FW	(Australia) Dylan Macallister	(Australia) Melbourne Heart	Undisclosed	13 January 2014	First team	

==== Out ====
#	Position	Player	Transferred to	Fee	Date	Team	Source
7	MF	(Hong Kong) Au Wai Lun	Retired	N/A	6 May 2013	First team	
11	MF	(Hong Kong) Lee Kin Wo	Retired	N/A	6 May 2013	First team	
1	GK	(Hong Kong) Chung Ho Yin	Retired	N/A	11 June 2013	First team	
3	DF	(Hong Kong) Tseng Siu Wing	Unattached (Released)	Free transfer	11 June 2013	First team	
5	DF	(Hong Kong) Wong Wai Tak	Unattached (Released)	Free transfer	11 June 2013	First team	
8	MF	(Hong Kong) Yeung Kin Keung	Unattached (Released)	Free transfer	11 June 2013	First team	
16	MF	(Hong Kong) Lo Kai Wah	Retired	N/A	11 June 2013	First team	
18	FW	(Hong Kong) Chan Yin Tak	Unattached (Released)	Free transfer	11 June 2013	First team	
20	MF	(Hong Kong) Leung Kam Fai	Unattached (Released)	Free transfer	11 June 2013	First team	
23	MF	(Hong Kong) Yeung Hei Chi	Unattached (Released)	Free transfer	11 June 2013	First team	
26	DF	(Hong Kong) Lai Kai Cheuk	Unattached (Released)	Free transfer	11 June 2013	First team	
27	MF	(Hong Kong) Lee Sze Ming	Unattached (Released)	Free transfer	11 June 2013	First team	
28	DF	(Hong Kong) Pang Chi Tong	Unattached (Released)	Free transfer	11 June 2013	First team	
29	FW	(Hong Kong) Yiu Hok Man	Unattached (Released)	Free transfer	11 June 2013	First team	
35	MF	(Hong Kong) Lo Chun Nam	Unattached (Released)	Free transfer	11 June 2013	First team	
2	DF	(Hong Kong) Lau Nim Yat	Unattached (Released)	Free transfer	3 January 2014	First team	

==== Loan In ====
Squad #	Position	Player	Loaned from	Date	Loan expires	Team	Source

==== Loan out ====
#	Position	Player	Loaned to	Date	Loan expires	Team	Source
18	DF	(Hong Kong) Kwok Wing Sun	(Hong Kong) Sunray Cave JC Sun Hei	16 September 2013	End of the season	First team	
20	MF	(Hong Kong) Wong Chun Hin	(Hong Kong) Sunray Cave JC Sun Hei	16 September 2013	End of the season	First team	
4	DF	(Hong Kong) Pak Wing Chak	(Hong Kong) Royal Southern	17 January 2014	End of the season	First team	

== Club ==
=== Coaching staff ===
Position	Staff
Head Coach	(Hong Kong) Lee Kin Wo
Assistant Coach	(Hong Kong) Lo Kai Wah
Assistant Coach	(Hong Kong) Cristiano Cordeiro
Assistant Coach	(Hong Kong) Wong Chun Yue
Goalkeeper Coach	(Hong Kong) Chung Ho Yin

Last updated: 19 June 2013
Source: Eastern AA - Hong Kong Football Association

== Squad statistics ==
=== Overall Stats ===
	First Division	Senior Shield	FA Cup	Total Stats
Games played	16	3	2	21
Games won	5	1	2	8
Games drawn	6	1	0	7
Games lost	5	1	0	6
Goals for	32	8	4	44
Goals against	32	7	1	40
Players used	21	15	15	21^{1}
Yellow cards	49	14	5	68
Red cards	1	1	1	3

Last updated: 12 April 2014
Source: Player Stats

Players Used: Eastern Salon have used a total of 21 different players in all competitions.

=== Squad Stats ===
				Total				Hong Kong First Division League		Senior Challenge Shield		FA Cup		
N	Pos.	Name	Nat.	GS	App	Gls	Min	App	Gls	App	Gls	App	Gls	Notes
1	GK	Paulo César	(Brazil)	8	9	-16	753	6	-13	2	-3	1		(−) GA
17	GK	Li Hon Ho	(Hong Kong)	13	13	-24	1197	10	-19	2	-4	1	-1	(−) GA
36	GK	Leung Man Lai	(Hong Kong)											(−) GA
4	DF	Pak Wing Chak	(Hong Kong)											On loan to Royal Southern
5	DF	Clayton	(Brazil)	19	20	3	1776	15	3	3		2		
6	DF	Wong Chin Hung	(Hong Kong)	2	9	1	279	7		2	1			
13	DF	Tse Man Wing	(Hong Kong)	13	14	2	1070	11	2	2		1		
15	DF	Beto	(Brazil)	18	20	5	1651	15	2	3	3	2		
23	DF	Leung Kwok Wai	(Hong Kong)	5	13	1	552	10	1	2		1		
28	DF	Wong Chi Chung	(Hong Kong)	2	4		196	4						
33	DF	Leung Chi Wing	(Hong Kong)	16	17		1414	13		2		2		
	DF	Kwok Wing Sun	(Hong Kong)											On loan to Sunray Cave JC Sun Hei
	DF	Lau Nim Yat	(Hong Kong)	8	8		604	6		2				
3	MF	Diego	(Brazil)	20	20	1	1830	16	1	2		2		
7	MF	Wong Chun Yue	(Hong Kong)		1		19	1						
8	MF	Lee Sze Ming	(Hong Kong)		2		70	2						
10	MF	Itaparica	(Brazil)	14	17	2	1146	12	2	3		2		
11	MF	Li Haiqiang	(Hong Kong)	15	18	3	1386	13	2	3		2	1	
12	MF	Man Pei Tak	(Hong Kong)	17	17		1515	13		2		2		
20	MF	Li Ka Chun	(Hong Kong)											
21	MF	Lau Ho Lam	(Hong Kong)											
27	MF	Yiu Ho Ming	(Hong Kong)											
30	MF	Wong Tsz Ho	(Hong Kong)		1		20	1						
	MF	Wong Chun Hin	(Hong Kong)											On loan to Sunray Cave JC Sun Hei
9	FW	Macallister	(Australia)	7	10	3	701	8	1			2	2	
18	FW	Liang Zicheng	(China)	7	9	4	646	7	3			2	1	
19	FW	Cheng Siu Wai	(Hong Kong)	6	14	3	675	11	3	3				
22	FW	Giovane	(Brazil)	19	21	16	1778	16	12	3	4	2		
26	FW	Leung Tsz Chun	(Hong Kong)	16	19		1365	14		3		2		
29	FW	Yiu Hok Man	(Hong Kong)	6	16		716	13		2		1		

Last updated: 12 April 2014
Ordered by Position
0 shown as blank

=== Top scorers ===
Place	Position	Nationality	Number	Name	First Division	Senior Shield	FA Cup	Total
1	FW	(Brazil)	22	Giovane	12	4	0	16
2	DF	(Brazil)	15	Beto	2	3	0	5
3	FW	(China)	18	Liang Zicheng	3	0	1	4
4	MF	(Brazil)	5	Clayton	3	0	0	3
4	FW	(Australia)	9	Macallister	1	0	2	3
4	MF	(Hong Kong)	11	Li Haiqiang	2	0	1	3
4	FW	(Hong Kong)	19	Cheng Siu Wai	3	0	0	3
8	MF	(Brazil)	10	Itaparica	2	0	0	2
8	DF	(Hong Kong)	13	Tse Man Wing	2	0	0	2
10	MF	(Brazil)	3	Diego	1	0	0	1
10	DF	(Hong Kong)	6	Wong Chin Hung	0	1	0	1
10	DF	(Hong Kong)	23	Leung Kwok Wai	1	0	0	1
TOTALS					32	8	4	44

Last update: 12 April 2014

=== Disciplinary record ===
N	P	Nat.	Name	League			Shield			FA Cup			Others			Total			Notes
N	P	Nat.	Name	Yellow card	Second yellow card	Red card	Yellow card	Second yellow card	Red card	Yellow card	Second yellow card	Red card	Yellow card	Second yellow card	Red card	Yellow card	Second yellow card	Red card	Notes
1	GK	(Brazil)	Paulo César	1			1									2			
3	MF	(Brazil)	Diego	5			2			2						9			
5	DF	(Brazil)	Clayton	4			1			1						6			
6	DF	(Hong Kong)	Wong Chin Hung																
7	MF	(Hong Kong)	Wong Chun Yue																
8	MF	(Hong Kong)	Lee Sze Ming																
9	FW	(Australia)	Macallister	2												2			
10	MF	(Brazil)	Itaparica	2			1									3			
11	MF	(Hong Kong)	Li Haiqiang	8												8			
12	MF	(Hong Kong)	Man Pei Tak	2			1									3			
13	DF	(Hong Kong)	Tse Man Wing	5			2									7			
15	DF	(Brazil)	Beto	4			1									5			
17	GK	(Hong Kong)	Li Hon Ho																
18	MF	(China)	Liang Zicheng	3						1						4			
19	FW	(Hong Kong)	Cheng Siu Wai	1												1			
20	MF	(Hong Kong)	Li Ka Chun																
21	MF	(Hong Kong)	Lau Ho Lam																
22	FW	(Brazil)	Giovane	1												1			
23	DF	(Hong Kong)	Leung Kwok Wai	2			1									3			
26	FW	(Hong Kong)	Leung Tsz Chun							1						1			
27	MF	(Hong Kong)	Yiu Ho Ming				1									1			
28	DF	(Hong Kong)	Wong Chi Chung	1								1				1		1	
29	FW	(Hong Kong)	Yiu Hok Man	2												2			
30	MF	(Hong Kong)	Wong Tsz Ho																
33	DF	(Hong Kong)	Leung Chi Wing	4	1		1									5	1		
36	GK	(Hong Kong)	Leung Man Tai																
[L]	MF	(Hong Kong)	Wong Chun Hin																
[L]	DF	(Hong Kong)	Kwok Wing Sun																
[L]	DF	(Hong Kong)	Pak Wing Chak																
	DF	(Hong Kong)	Lau Nim Yat	3			2		1							5		1	

Last updated: 12 April 2014
Source: Competitive matches
Ordered by (red card) , (second yellow card) and (yellow card)
(yellow card) = Number of bookings; (second yellow card) = Number of sending offs after a second yellow card; (red card) = Number of sending offs by a direct red card.

=== Substitution Record ===
Includes all competitive matches.

			League		Shield		FA Cup		Total	
No.	Pos	Name	subson	subsoff	subson	subsoff	subson	subsoff	subson	subsoff
Goalkeepers
1	GK	Paulo César	0	0	1	0	0	0	1	0
17	GK	Li Hon Ho	0	0	0	1	0	0	0	1
36	GK	Leung Man Lai	0	0	0	0	0	0	0	0
Defenders
4	DF	Pak Wing Chak	0	0	0	0	0	0	0	0
5	DF	Clayton Afonso	1	1	0	0	0	0	1	1
6	DF	Wong Chin Hung	5	2	2	0	0	0	7	2
13	DF	Tse Man Wing	1	9	0	0	0	0	1	9
15	DF	Beto	2	1	0	0	0	0	2	1
23	DF	Leung Kwok Wai	6	1	2	0	0	0	8	1
28	DF	Wong Chi Chung	1	0	0	0	1	0	2	0
33	DF	Leung Chi Wing	1	1	0	0	0	0	1	1
	DF	Kwok Wing Sun	0	0	0	0	0	0	0	0
	DF	Lau Nim Yat	0	4	0	0	0	0	0	4
Midfielders
3	MF	Diego Eli Moreira	0	0	0	0	0	0	0	0
7	MF	Wong Chun Yue	1	0	0	0	0	0	1	0
8	MF	Lee Sze Ming	2	0	0	0	0	0	2	0
10	MF	Itaparica	2	6	0	1	1	0	3	7
11	MF	Li Haiqiang	3	2	0	2	0	1	3	5
12	MF	Man Pei Tak	0	1	0	0	0	0	0	1
20	MF	Li Ka Chun	0	0	0	0	0	0	0	0
21	MF	Lau Ho Lam	0	0	0	0	0	0	0	0
27	MF	Yiu Ho Ming	0	0	0	0	0	0	0	0
30	MF	Wong Tsz Ho	1	0	0	0	0	0	1	0
	MF	Wong Chun Hin	0	0	0	0	0	0	0	0
Forwards
9	FW	Dylan Macallister	3	1	0	0	0	1	3	2
18	FW	Liang Zicheng	2	2	0	0	0	1	2	3
19	FW	Cheng Siu Wai	7	3	1	2	0	0	8	5
22	FW	Giovane Silva	2	2	0	0	0	0	2	2
26	FW	Leung Tsz Chun	2	10	1	2	0	0	3	12
29	FW	Yiu Hok Man	8	4	1	0	1	0	10	4

Last updated: 12 April 2014

=== Captains ===
No.	P	Name	Country	No. games	Notes
33	DF	Leung Chi Wing	(Hong Kong)	16	Captain
11	MF	Li Haiqiang	(Hong Kong)	4	2nd vice captain
29	FW	Yiu Hok Man	(Hong Kong)	1	1st vice captain

Last updated: 12 April 2014
Source: Competitive match reports.
Competitive matches only
Matches started as captain only
Country: FIFA nationality; No.: Squad number; P: Position; Name: Player name; No. Games: Number of games started as captain.

== Competitions ==
=== Overall ===
Competition	Started round	Current position / round	Final position / round	First match	Last match
Hong Kong First Division League	—	3rd		1 September 2013	
Senior Challenge Shield	Quarter-finals	—		October 2013	
FA Cup	Quarter-finals	—		January 2014	

Updated to match played 13 August 2013
Source: Competitions

=== First Division League ===
==== Classification ====
Pos	Team	Pld	W	D	L	GF	GA	GD	Pts	Qualification or relegation
4	Royal Southern (R)	18	5	6	7	25	32	−7	21	2013–14 Hong Kong season play-off and relegation to 2014–15 Hong Kong First Division League (Note: Since the 2013–14 Hong Kong Senior Challenge Shield winners (South China) would at this point qualify for the 2013–14 Hong Kong season play-off, the 4th placed team would qualify for the Season Play-off. At the same time, Royal Southern declined to participate in the 2014–15 Hong Kong Premier League and would self-relegate in the following season.)
5	Hong Kong Rangers	18	5	6	7	23	32	−9	21	
6	Eastern Salon	18	5	6	7	34	37	−3	21	2013–14 Hong Kong season play-off (Note: Eastern Salon qualified for the 2013–14 Hong Kong season play-off as winners of the 2013–14 Hong Kong FA Cup.)
7	I-Sky Yuen Long	18	5	5	8	25	33	−8	20	
8	Sunray Cave JC Sun Hei (R)	18	5	4	9	32	41	−9	19	Relegation to 2014–15 Hong Kong First Division League (Note: Sunray Cave JC Sun Hei & Citizen declined to participate in the 2014–15 Hong Kong Premier League and would self-relegate in the following season.)

Updated to match(es) played on 11 May 2014. Source: Hong Kong Football Association
Rules for classification: 1) points; 2) head-to-head points; 3) head-to-head goal difference; 4) head-to-head goals scored; 5) goal difference; 6) number of goals scored.
(R) Relegated

==== Results summary ====
Overall								Home						Away					
Pld	W	D	L	GF	GA	GD	Pts	W	D	L	GF	GA	GD	W	D	L	GF	GA	GD
16	5	6	5	32	30	+2	21	3	3	2	20	13	+7	2	3	3	12	17	−5

Last updated: 30 March 2014.
Source: First Division

==== Results by round ====
Round	1	2	4	5	6	7	3	9	8	10	11	12	13	14	15	16	17	18	19	20	21	22
Ground	H	A	A	A	A	A	H	A	H	H	H	A	H	H	H	H	H	A	A	A	A	H
Result	V	L	D	D	W	D	V	W	L	D	W	L	L	D	D	W	W	L				
Position (Note: South China's position at the end of the day in which their match was played)	6	11	10	7	6	6	6	4	5	6	4	5	6	4	4	4	4	4				

Updated to match(es) played on 30 March 2014. Source: Competitive Matches
A = Away; H = Home; W = Win; D = Draw; L = Loss; V = Voided

== Matches ==
Win Draw Loss Void

=== Pre-season friendlies ===
4 August 2013	Hong Kong FC	0 – 7	(Hong Kong) Eastern Salon	Happy Valley, Hong Kong
16:00 UTC+8			Giovane; Diego; Itaparica; Cheng Siu Wai (o.g.)	Stadium: HKFC Soccer Pitch

6 August 2013	Eastern Salon (Hong Kong)	2 – 0	(Hong Kong) Sunray Cave JC Sun Hei	Shek Kip Mei, Kowloon
13:00 UTC+8	Itaparica; Giovane			Stadium: Shek Kip Mei Park

9 August 2013	Eastern Salon (Hong Kong)	1 – 1	(Hong Kong) Happy Valley	Tsing Yi, New Territories
11:30 UTC+8	Itaparica		Leung Magnus	Stadium: Tsing Yi Northeast Park

13 August 2013	Tuen Mun (Hong Kong)	–	(Hong Kong) Eastern Salon	Guangzhou, China PR

18 August 2013	Happy Valley (Hong Kong)	–	(Hong Kong) Eastern Salon	Guangzhou, China PR
				Stadium: Zhu Liao Football Training Base

=== First Division League ===
1 September 2013 Round 1	Eastern Salon	2 – 1 (Voided)	Tuen Mun	Tsuen Wan, New Territories
14:30 UTC+8	Itaparica 16', 45+2'; Leung Kwok Wai (yellow card) 68'; Leung Chi Wing (yellow card) 83'; Lau Nim Yat (yellow card) 87'	Report	27' Yip Tsz Chun; (yellow card) 90' Xie Silida	Stadium: Shing Mun Valley Sports Ground (Capacity: 5,000); Attendance: 1,154; Referee: Cheng Oi Cho; Assistant referees: Lam Chi Ho, Yau Ho Fai; Fourth official: Lui Siu Chuen

13 September 2013 Round 2	Kitchee	3 – 0	Eastern Salon	Mong Kok, Kowloon
20:00 UTC+8	Beto 43' (o.g.); Beloncoso 43'; Jordi (yellow card) 28' (goal) 57' (pen.); Dani (yellow card) 70'	Report	(yellow card) 43' Man Pei Tak; (yellow card) 90+3' Cheng Siu Wai	Stadium: Mong Kok Stadium (Capacity: 6,680); Attendance: 2,214; Referee: Tong Kui Sum; Assistant referees: Lam Nai Kei, Lau Fong Hei; Fourth official: Lam Chi Ho

22 September 2013 Round 3	Eastern Salon	Postponed (Note: The match originally kicks off on 22 September 2013. Due to typhoon, the match was cancelled and postponed. It has been scheduled to play at 14:30 on 3 November 2013.)	Happy Valley	Tsuen Wan, New Territories
14:30 UTC+8				Stadium: Shing Mun Valley Sports Ground (Capacity: 5,000)

28 September 2013 Round 4	Yokohama FC Hong Kong	1 – 1	Eastern Salon	Tseung Kwan O, New Territories
14:30 UTC+8	Fong Pak Lun (yellow card) 4'; Leung Kwun Chung (yellow card) 10'; Fukuda 48'; Leung Lok Hang (yellow card) 66'; Park Tae-Hong (yellow card) 68'; Yoshitake (yellow card) 79'	Report	(yellow card) 13' Lau Nim Yat; 32' Giovane; (yellow card) 52' Clayton; (yellow card) 55' Beto; (yellow card) 79' Yiu Hok Man; (yellow card) 90+2' Diego	Stadium: Tseung Kwan O Sports Ground (Capacity: 3,500); Attendance: 431; Referee: Ng Kai Lam; Assistant referees: Chan Shui Hung, Sarao Amarjit Singh; Fourth official: Lam Nai Kei

6 October 2013 Round 5	Citizen	1 – 1	Eastern Salon	Tsing Yi, New Territories
17:30 UTC+8	Nakamura (yellow card) 31'; Paulinho 52'; Tam Lok Hin (yellow card) 84'	Report	38' Cheng Siu Wai; (yellow card) 50' Diego; (yellow card) 79' Tse Man Wing	Stadium: Tsing Yi Sports Ground (Capacity: 1,500); Attendance: 648; Referee: Luk Kin Sun; Assistant referees: Lam Nai Kei, Yau Ho Fai; Fourth official: Ho Wai Sing

20 October 2013 Round 6	I-Sky Yuen Long	1 – 2	Eastern Salon	Yuen Long, New Territories
17:30 UTC+8	Sandro 51'; Souza (yellow card) 69'	Report	1' Itaparica; 21' Giovane; (yellow card) 87' Diego	Stadium: Yuen Long Stadium (Capacity: 4,932); Attendance: 1,107; Referee: Ng Kai Lam; Assistant referees: Yu Chun Sun, Yu Kin Fung; Fourth official: Lui Siu Chuen

27 October 2013 Round 7	Biu Chun Rangers	1 – 1	Eastern Salon	Sham Shui Po, Kowloon
14:30 UTC+8	Schutz 2' (yellow card) 3'; Liu Songwei (yellow card) 40'; Miroslav (yellow card) 56'; Moses (yellow card) 80'; Leung Hin Kit (yellow card) 84'	Report	(yellow card) 24' Clayton; (yellow card) 37' Itaparica; 90' Leung Kwok Wai; (yellow card) 90+2' Leung Chi Wing	Stadium: Sham Shui Po Sports Ground (Capacity: 2,194); Attendance: 690; Referee: Tong Kui Sum; Assistant referees: Chow Chun Kit, Chan Ming Siu; Fourth official: Sarao Amarjit Singh

3 November 2013 Round 3P	Eastern Salon	2 – 0 (Voided)	Happy Valley	Tsuen Wan, New Territories
14:30 UTC+8	Clayton 38'; Tse Man Wing 81' (yellow card) 90+4'	Report	(yellow card) 45+1' Abálsamo; (yellow card) 73' Bamnjo	Stadium: Shing Mun Valley Sports Ground (Capacity: 5,000); Attendance: 442; Referee: Lau Fong Hei; Assistant referees: Chan Shui Hung, Sarao Amarjit Singh; Fourth official: Yu Kin Fung

24 November 2013 Round 9	Sunray Cave JC Sun Hei	2 – 3	Eastern Salon	Tsing Yi, New Territories
14:30 UTC+8	Lugo 18', 40'; Su Yang (yellow card) 66'; Yuen Tsun Nam (yellow card) 72'; Kilama (yellow card) 90+4'	Report	4' Clayton; 52' Itaparica; 68' Giovane; (yellow card) 90+4' Li Haiqiang	Stadium: Tsing Yi Sports Ground (Capacity: 1,500); Attendance: 606; Referee: Tong Kui Sum; Assistant referees: Lau Fong Hei, Sarao Amarjit Singh; Fourth official: Fok Pong Shing

1 December 2013 Round 8	Eastern Salon	3 – 4	Sun Pegasus	Mong Kok, Kowloon
14:30 UTC+8	Cheng Siu Wai 33'; Li Haiqiang (yellow card) 45+1'; Tse Man Wing (yellow card) 52' (goal) 74'; Leung Chi Wing (yellow card) 54' (yellow-red card) 90+1'; Lau Nim Yat (yellow card) 65'; Giovane 83'	Report	(yellow card) 34' Tong Kin Man; (yellow card) 36' Ju Yingzhi; 48', 90+2' Cesar; 60' McKee; 65' (pen.) Raščić; (yellow card) 90+4' Miović	Stadium: Mong Kok Stadium (Note: The match will be played at Mong Kok Stadium instead of Eastern Salon's home ground Shing Mun Valley Sports Ground.) (Capacity: 6,680); Attendance: 1,757; Referee: Tong Kui Sum; Assistant referees: Chan Ming Siu, Fok Pong Shing; Fourth official: Lau Fong Hei

5 January 2014 Round 10	Eastern Salon	0 – 0	South China	Mong Kok, Kowloon
14:30 UTC+8	Li Haiqiang (yellow card) 74'; Diego (yellow card) 84'; Man Pei Tek (yellow card) 90+3'	Report	(yellow card) 50' Chan Siu Kwan; (yellow card) 59' Ticão	Stadium: Mong Kok Stadium (Capacity: 6,680); Attendance: 3,155; Referee: Ho Wai Sing; Assistant referees: Cheng Oi Cho, Yu Chun Sun; Fourth official: Lau Fong Hei

26 January 2014 Round 11	Eastern Salon	4 – 1	Royal Southern	Sham Shui Po, Kowloon
14:30 UTC+8	Beto (yellow card) 22' (goal) 56' (pen.); Itaparica (yellow card) 44'; Giovane 52', 89'; Leung Chi Wing (yellow card) 59'; Macallister 82'; Li Haiqiang (yellow card) 86'	Report	(yellow card) 16' Lo Chi Kwan; (yellow card) 22' Rubén; 31' Ip Chung Long; (red card) 62' Ngan Lok Fung; (yellow card) 63' Yago	Stadium: Sham Shui Po Sports Ground (Note: The match will be played at Sham Shui Po Sports Ground instead of Eastern Salon's home ground Shing Mun Valley Sports Ground.) (Capacity: 2,194); Attendance: 919; Referee: Ng Chiu Kok; Assistant referees: Lau Fong Hei, Sarao Amarjit Singh; Fourth official: Luk Kin Sun

9 February 2014 Round 12	Royal Southern	3 – 2	Eastern Salon	Aberdeen, Hong Kong Island
14:30 UTC+8	Lo Chi Kwan (yellow card) 19'; Carril 36'; Chung Hon Chee 42'; Díaz (yellow card) 70'; Héctor (yellow card) 75'; Ip Chung Long 81' (yellow card) 83'	Report	64' (yellow card) 77' Li Haiqiang; (yellow card) 68' Liang Zicheng; 84' Clayton; (yellow card) 90+12' Leung Kwok Wai	Stadium: Aberdeen Sports Ground (Capacity: 4,000); Attendance: 468; Referee: Tong Kui Sum; Assistant referees: Cheng Oi Cho, Lui Siu Chuen; Fourth official: Sarao Amarjit Singh

16 February 2014 Round 13	Eastern Salon	3 – 4	Biu Chun Rangers	Mong Kok, Kowloon
14:30 UTC+8	Beto (yellow card) 17'; Diego 57'; Clayton 77'; Giovane (yellow card) 80'; Liang Zicheng 88'; Wong Chi Chung (yellow card) 90+1'	Report	(yellow card) 17' Schutz; (yellow card) 32' Chow Cheuk Fung; (yellow card) 41' (yellow-red card) 72' Joel; 48' (o.g.) Leung Chi Wing; 50' Chuck Yiu Kwok; 58' Miroslav; 63' Lam Hok Hei	Stadium: Mong Kok Stadium (Capacity: 6,680); Attendance: 902; Referee: Ng Kai Lam; Assistant referees: Chan Ming Siu, Yu Chun Sun; Fourth official: Yu Kin Fung

22 February 2014 Round 14	Eastern Salon	2 – 2	Kitchee	Mong Kok, Kowloon
14:30 UTC+8	Liang Zicheng (yellow card) 30' (goal) 66'; Li Haiqiang (yellow card) 45' (goal) 46'	Report	(yellow card) 5' (goal) 56' Cascón; (yellow card) 30' Lo Kwan Yee; 49' Belencoso	Stadium: Mong Kok Stadium (Capacity: 6,680); Attendance: 1,518; Referee: Ng Kai Lam; Assistant referees: Cheng Oi Cho, Sarao Amarjit Singh; Fourth official: Law Bik Chi

8 March 2014 Round 15	Eastern Salon	2 – 2	Citizen	Mong Kok, Kowloon
14:30 UTC+8	Tse Man Wing 24'; Diego (yellow card) 29'; Li Haiqiang (yellow card) 32'; Macallister (yellow card) 45+5'; Clayton (yellow card) 45+5'; Yiu Hok Man (yellow card) 52'; Giovane 61'	Report	28' Hélio; 40' Paulinho; 45+3' (yellow card) 45+5' Stefan; (yellow card) 45+5' Krasić; (yellow card) 57' Sham Kwok Fai; (yellow card) 69' Tam Lok Hin; (yellow card) 90+2' So Loi Keung	Stadium: Mong Kok Stadium (Capacity: 6,680); Attendance: 1,152; Referee: Tong Kui Sum; Assistant referees: Lau Fong Hei, Lam Nai Kei; Fourth official: Law Bik Chi

16 March 2014 Round 16	Eastern Salon	2 – 0	Yokohama FC Hong Kong	Mong Kok, Kowloon
14:30 UTC+8	Liang Zicheng (yellow card) 37' (goal) 85'; Giovane 47'; Tse Man Wing (yellow card) 58'; Beto (yellow card) 88'	Report	(yellow card) 10' Wong Wai; (yellow card) 25' Leung Kwun Chung; (yellow card) 70' Leung Nok Hang	Stadium: Mong Kok Stadium (Capacity: 6,680); Attendance: 1,055; Referee: Luk Kin Sun; Assistant referees: Chan Shui Hung, Yu Kin Fung; Fourth official: Lau Fong Hei

22 March 2014 Round 17	Eastern Salon	4 – 2	Sunray Cave JC Sun Hei	Sham Shui Po, Kowloon
14:30 UTC+8	Cheng Siu Wai 27'; Li Haiqiang (yellow card) 28'; Giovane 33', 49', 74'; Clayton (yellow card) 85'; Leung Chi Wing (yellow card) 86'; Paulo (yellow card) 89'	Report	(yellow card) 57' Cheung Kwok Ming; 63' Reinaldo; 90+2' (o.g.) Leung Chi Wing; (yellow card) 90+2' Lai Yiu Cheong	Stadium: Sham Shui Po Sports Ground (Capacity: 2,194); Attendance: 936; Referee: Ho Wai Sing; Assistant referees: Chow Chun Kit, Yu Chun Sun; Fourth official: Lui Siu Chuen

30 March 2014 Round 18	Sun Pegasus	5 – 2	Eastern Salon	Mong Kok, Kowloon
14:30 UTC+8	Yip Tsz Chun 2'; Tong Kin Man (yellow card) 10'; McKee (yellow card) 43' (goal) 45+1', 82'; Ju Yingzhi 48'; Raščić 53'; Škorić (yellow card) 76'; Wong Yim Kwan (yellow card) 85'	Report	(yellow card) 12' Tse Man Wing; (yellow card) 62' Macallister; 76' Giovane; 85' Beto	Stadium: Mong Kok Stadium (Capacity: 6,680); Attendance: 1,465; Referee: Ng Kai Lam; Assistant referees: Chow Chun Kit, Sarao Amarjit Singh; Fourth official: Tang Hing Fu

5 April 2014 Round 19	Tuen Mun	Cancelled	Eastern Salon	Tuen Mun, New Territories
14:30 UTC+8				Stadium: Tuen Mun Tang Shiu Kin Sports Ground (Capacity: 2,200)

20 April 2014 Round 20	Happy Valley	Cancelled	Eastern Salon	Siu Sai Wan, Hong Kong Island
14:30 UTC+8				Stadium: Siu Sai Wan Sports Ground (Capacity: 12,000)

3 May 2014 Round 21	South China	v	Eastern Salon	So Kon Po, Hong Kong Island
14:30 UTC+8				Stadium: Hong Kong Stadium (Capacity: 40,000)

10–11 May 2013 Round 22	Eastern Salon	v	I-Sky Yuen Long	Tsuen Wan, New Territories
TBC				Stadium: Shing Mun Valley Sports Ground (Capacity: 5,000)

=== Senior Shield ===
10 November 2013 1st Round	Eastern Salon	3 – 1	I-Sky Yuen Long	Mong Kok, Kowloon
17:30 UTC+8	Beto 7'; Giovane 19', 90+2'; Diego (yellow card) 45+3'; Man Pei Tak (yellow card) 75'; Lau Nim Yat (yellow card) 89'	Report	22' Fábio; (red card) 45+2' Sandro; (yellow card) 52' Marques; (yellow card) 88' Souza; (yellow card) 90+1' Cheung Tsz Kin	Stadium: Mong Kok Stadium (Capacity: 6,680); Attendance: 849; Referee: Cheng Oi Cho; Assistant referees: Lam Nai Kei, Sarao Amarjit Singh; Fourth official: Lam Chi Ho

8 December 2013 Quarter-finals	Citizen	3 – 3 (a.e.t.) (2 – 4 p)	Eastern Salon	Tseung Kwan O, New Territories
14:30 UTC+8	Chan Hin Kwong (yellow card) 18'; Fernando (yellow card) 25'; Sham Kwok Fai 33'; Nakamura (yellow card) 49' (yellow-red card) 54'; Sham Kwok Keung 58', 90+3'; Hélio (yellow card) 72' (yellow-red card) 107'	Report	(yellow card) 22' Clayton; (yellow card) 45+1' (red card) 49' Lau Nim Yat; (yellow card) 50' Diego; (yellow card) 51' Yiu Hok Man; (yellow card) 52' (goal) 58' Beto; 61', 68' Giovane; (yellow card) 92' Tse Man Wing; (yellow card) 96' Leung Kwok Wai	Stadium: Tseung Kwan O Sports Ground (Capacity: 3,000); Attendance: 471; Referee: Ng Chiu Kok; Assistant referees: Chow Chun Kit, Yu Chun Sun; Fourth official: Law Bik Chi
	Penalties
	Detinho (penalty scored); Krasić (penalty scored); Paulinho (penalty missed); Sham Kwok Keung (penalty missed)		(penalty scored) Beto; (penalty missed) Clayton; (penalty scored) Giovane; (penalty scored) Leung Tsz Chun; (penalty scored) Diego

25 December 2013 Semi-finals	Eastern Salon	2 – 3 (a.e.t.)	South China	Mong Kok, Kowloon
15:00 UTC+8	Tse Man Wing (yellow card) 11'; Paulo (yellow card) 61'; Itaparica (yellow card) 81'; Beto 88'; Leung Chi Wing (yellow card) 102'; Wong Chin Hung 117'	Report	6' João Emir; (yellow card) 61' Ko Kyung-Joon; (yellow card) 87' (goal) 107' Ticão; (yellow card) 95' Dhiego; 105+1' Lee Wai Lim	Stadium: Mong Kok Stadium (Capacity: 6,680); Attendance: 4,628; Referee: Liu Kwok Man; Assistant referees: Luk Kin Sun, Lam Nai Kei; Fourth official: Tang Hing Fu

=== FA Cup ===
1 March 2014 Round of 16	Eastern Salon	3 – 1	Yokohama FC Hong Kong	Mong Kok, Kowloon
14:30 (UTC+8)	Macallister 20', 45+1'; Liang Zicheng 38'; Diego (yellow card) 50'; Wong Chi Chung (red card) 90+5'	Report	(yellow card) 52' Leung Kwun Chung; 74' Fukuda; (yellow card) 78' Li Chu Yeung	Stadium: Mong Kok Stadium (Capacity: 6,680); Attendance: 1,071; Referee: Ng Chiu Kok; Assistant referees: Lam Chi Ho, Sarao Amarjit Singh; Fourth official: Chan Ming Siu

12 April 2014 Quarter-finals	Sunray Cave JC Sun Hei	0 – 1	Eastern Salon	Mong Kok, Kowloon
17:30 UTC+8	Kilama (yellow card) 41'; Cheung Kwok Ming (yellow card) 43' (yellow-red card) 88'; Roberto (yellow card) 55'	Report	11' Li Haiqiang; (yellow card) 27' Clayton; (yellow card) 83' Leung Tsz Chun; (yellow card) 84' Diego; (yellow card) 90+4' Liang Zicheng	Stadium: Mong Kok Stadium (Capacity: 6,680); Attendance: 1,010; Referee: Ho Wai Sing; Assistant referees: Chow Chun Kit, Lam Chi Ho; Fourth official: Ng Chiu Kok

26 April 2014 Semi-finals	Royal Southern	v	Eastern Salon	Mong Kok, Kowloon
14:30 UTC+8				Stadium: Mong Kok Stadium (Capacity: 6,680)
