= 2014–15 Hong Kong Senior Shield =

Tournament details
- Country: Hong Kong
- Teams: 9

Final positions
- Champions: Eastern (9th title)
- Runners-up: Kitchee

Tournament statistics
- Matches played: 8
- Goals scored: 31 (3.88 per match)
- Attendance: 14,335 (1,792 per match)

2014–15 Hong Kong Senior Shield was the 113th season of one of the Asian oldest football knockout competitions, Hong Kong Senior Shield. Only nine teams entered this edition, with one game being played in first round before the quarter-final stage. The competition was only open to teams that play in the Hong Kong Premier League.

== Calendar ==
Stage	Round	Date
Knockout	First round	26 October 2014
Knockout	Quarter-final	29–30 November 2014
Knockout	Semi-final	27 – 28 December 2014
Knockout	Final	17 January 2015

== Bracket ==
First round
Yuen Long	1
**Wong Tai Sin**	**2**

Quarter-finals
Pegasus	1
**Wong Tai Sin**	**3**
Tai Po	2
**Kitchee**	**3**
**South China**	**4**
Rangers	1
**Eastern**	**2**
YFCMD	0

Semi-finals
Wong Tai Sin	0
**Kitchee**	**3**
South China	1
**Eastern**	**3**

Final
Kitchee	2
**Eastern**	**3**

Bold = winner
* = after extra time, ( ) = penalty shootout score

== Fixtures and results ==
=== First round ===
26 October 2014	Yuen Long	**1–2**	**Wong Tai Sin**	Sham Shui Po
14:30 UTC+8	Yuan Yang 14'	Report	Maurício 6'; Sandro 79'	Stadium: Sham Shui Po Sports Ground (Capacity: 2,194); Attendance: 546; Referee: Ho Wai Sing; Assistant referees: Chan Siu Hung, Lee Chung Yin; Fourth official: Mok Ka Ming

=== Quarter-finals ===
29 November 2014	Pegasus	**1–3**	**Wong Tai Sin**	Mong Kok
14:30 UTC+8	Miović 44'	Report	Sandro 47' (pen.), 50'; Wong Tsz Ho 90+6'	Stadium: Mong Kok Stadium; Attendance: 779; Referee: Ng Chiu Kok; Assistant referees: Chan Siu Hung, Lee Chung Yin; Fourth official: Law Bik Chi

29 November 2014	Tai Po	**2–3**	**Kitchee**	Tsing Yi
14:30 UTC+8	Lam Ngai Tong 6'; Chan Yuk Chi 50'	Report	Jordi 32' (pen.), 69'; Paulinho 61'	Stadium: Tsing Yi Sports Ground; Attendance: 413; Referee: Chan Ming Siu; Assistant referees: Chow Chun Kit, Mok Kar Main; Fourth official: Leung Chung Yin

30 November 2014	**South China**	**4–1**	Rangers	Mong Kok
14:30 UTC+8	Russell 52'; Nakamura 61'; Evan 64'; Cheng Lai Hin 74'	Report	Lam Hok Hei 78'	Stadium: Mong Kok Stadium; Attendance: 1,279; Referee: Lau Fong Hei; Assistant referees: Lam Nai Kei, Yu Kin Fung; Fourth official: Chan Ming Siu

30 November 2014	**Eastern**	**2–0**	YFCMD	Tsing Yi
14:30 UTC+8	Roberto 28'; Leung Tsz Chun 69'	Report		Stadium: Tsing Yi Sports Ground; Attendance: 492; Referee: Luk Kin Sun; Assistant referees: Yau Ho Fai, Yau Tsz Yeung; Fourth official: Tang Hing Fu

=== Semi-finals ===
27 December 2014	Wong Tai Sin	**0–3**	**Kitchee**	Mong Kok
14:30 UTC+8		Report	Lam Ka Wai 27'; Jordi 68'; Belencoso 83'	Stadium: Mong Kok Stadium; Attendance: 1,283; Referee: Ho Wai Sing; Assistant referees: Lam Nai Kei, Sarao Amarjit Singh; Fourth official: Tang Hing Fu

28 December 2014	South China	**1–3**	**Eastern**	Mong Kok
14:30 UTC+8	Nakamura 38'	Report	Kilama 8'; Macallister 10'; Lo Chi Kwan 27'	Stadium: Mong Kok Stadium; Attendance: 3,410; Referee: Tong Kui Sum; Assistant referees: Chung Ming Sang, Fok Pong Sing; Fourth official: Lau Fong Hei

=== Final ===
17 January 2015	Kitchee	**2–3**	**Eastern**	So Kon Po
14:30 UTC+8	Belencoso 38'; Jordi 90+3'	Report	Saric 11', 83'; Macallister 64'	Stadium: Hong Kong Stadium; Attendance: 6,133; Referee: Liu Kwok Man

KITCHEE:
GK	23	(Hong Kong) Guo Jianqiao^{LP}
RB	12	(Hong Kong) Lo Kwan Yee^{LP} (c)
CB	2	(Spain) Fernando Recio^{FP}
CB	16	(Hong Kong) Tsang Chi Hau^{LP}
LB	3	(Spain) Dani Cancela^{FP}	(yellow card) 65'	(substituted off) 71'
DM	19	(Hong Kong) Huang Yang^{LP}
CM	10	(Hong Kong) Lam Ka Wai^{LP}
CM	23	(Hong Kong) Matthew Lam^{LP}		(substituted off) 90+4'
RW	18	(Spain) Jordi Tarrés^{FP}
LW	15	(Hong Kong) Christian Annan^{LP}		(substituted off) 77'
CF	9	(Spain) Juan Belencoso^{FP}
Substitutes:
GK	1	(Hong Kong) Wang Zhenpeng^{LP}
DF	5	(Brazil) Hélio^{LP}		(substituted on) 90+4'
MF	6	(Hong Kong) Gao Wen^{LP}		(substituted on) 77'
MF	7	(Hong Kong) Xu Deshuai^{LP}
MF	17	(Brazil) Paulinho Piracicaba^{LP}		(substituted on) 71'
DF	21	(Hong Kong) Tsang Kam To^{LP}
MF	38	(Hong Kong) Ngan Lok Fung^{LP}
Head Coach:
(Spain) José Molina

EASTERN:
GK	1	(Hong Kong) Yapp Hung Fai^{LP}	(yellow card) 90+5'
RB	32	(Hong Kong) Lo Chi Kwan^{LP}		(substituted off) 84'
CB	2	(Hong Kong) Jean-Jacques Kilama^{LP}	(yellow card) 42'
CB	14	(Hong Kong) Lee Chi Ho^{LP}
LB	33	(Hong Kong) Leung Chi Wing^{LP} (c)
DM	15	(Brazil) Roberto Orlando^{LP}
DM	3	(Brazil) Diego Eli Moreira^{FP}	(yellow card) 79'
RM	8	(Croatia) Miroslav Saric^{FP}		(substituted off) 89'
LM	18	(Hong Kong) Liang Zicheng^{LP}
SS	22	(Brazil) Giovane Silva^{FP}
CF	9	(Australia) Dylan Macallister^{FP}		(substituted off) 77'
Substitutes:
GK	17	(Hong Kong) Li Hon Ho^{LP}
FW	11	(England) Rohan Ricketts^{FP}		(substituted on) 77'
DF	12	(Hong Kong) Man Pei Tak^{LP}		(substituted on) 84'
DF	13	(Hong Kong) Tse Man Wing^{LP}		(substituted on) 89'
DF	23	(Hong Kong) Leung Kwok Wai^{LP}
MF	26	(Hong Kong) Leung Tsz Chun^{LP}
FW	29	(Hong Kong) Yiu Hok Man^{LP}
Head Coach:
(Hong Kong) Cristiano Cordeiro

**MATCH OFFICIALS**

- Assistant referees:
  - Lam Nai Kei
  - Fok Pong Shing
- Fourth official: Lau Fong Hei
- ^{LP} Local Player
- ^{FP} Foreign Player

**MATCH RULES**

- 90 minutes. (1st Half Added Time: 2 mins, 2nd Half Added Time: min)
- 30 minutes of extra-time if necessary.
- Penalty shoot-out if scores still level.
- Seven named substitutes
- Maximum of 3 substitutions.
