= Diego Eli =

Hong Kong footballer (born 1988)

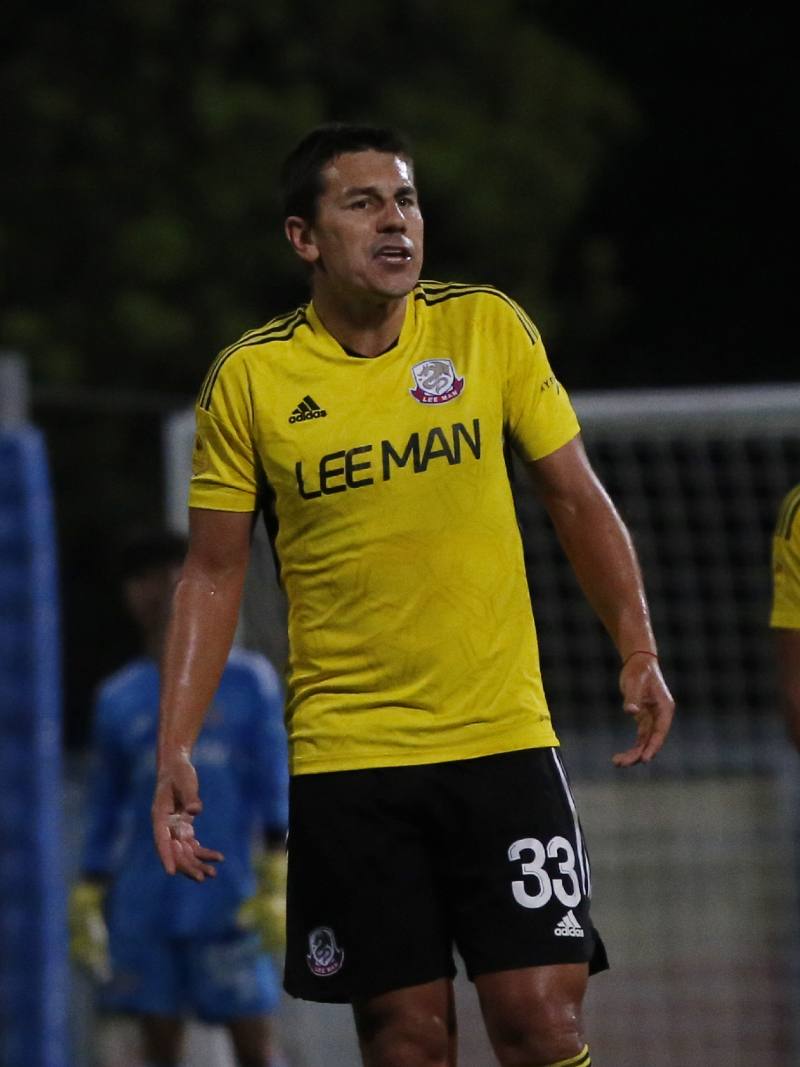
- Diego with Lee Man in 2023

Personal information
- Full name: Diego Eli Moreira
- Date of birth: 4 September 1988 (age 38)
- Place of birth: Santo Antônio da Platina, Brazil
- Height: 1.80 m (5 ft 11 in)
- Position: Defensive midfielder

Team information
- Current team: Kowloon City
- Number: 5

Youth career
- 1999–2002: AABB Santo Antônio da Platina
- 2002–2005: UPE Clube de Campo

Senior career*
Years	Team	Apps	(Gls)
2006	Associação Ibaiti		
2006	Real Brasil		
2007	SER Caxias do Sul		
2008	Pelotas		
2009	Londrina		
2010–2011	Avenida	9	(0)
2011	→ Goiatuba (loan)		
2011	Esportivo		
2012	Juventus-RS		
2012–2013	Tuen Mun	17	(0)
2013–2021	Eastern	108	(14)
2021–2024	Lee Man	23	(1)
2024–	Kowloon City	49	(2)

International career^{‡}
2021–2022	Hong Kong	4	(0)
- * Club domestic league appearances and goals as of 8 November 2026 ‡ National team caps and goals as of 11 June 2022

Diego Eli Moreira (Chinese: 迪高; born 4 September 1988) is a professional footballer who currently plays as a defensive midfielder for Hong Kong Premier League club Kowloon City. Born in Brazil, he plays for the Hong Kong national team.

== Club career ==
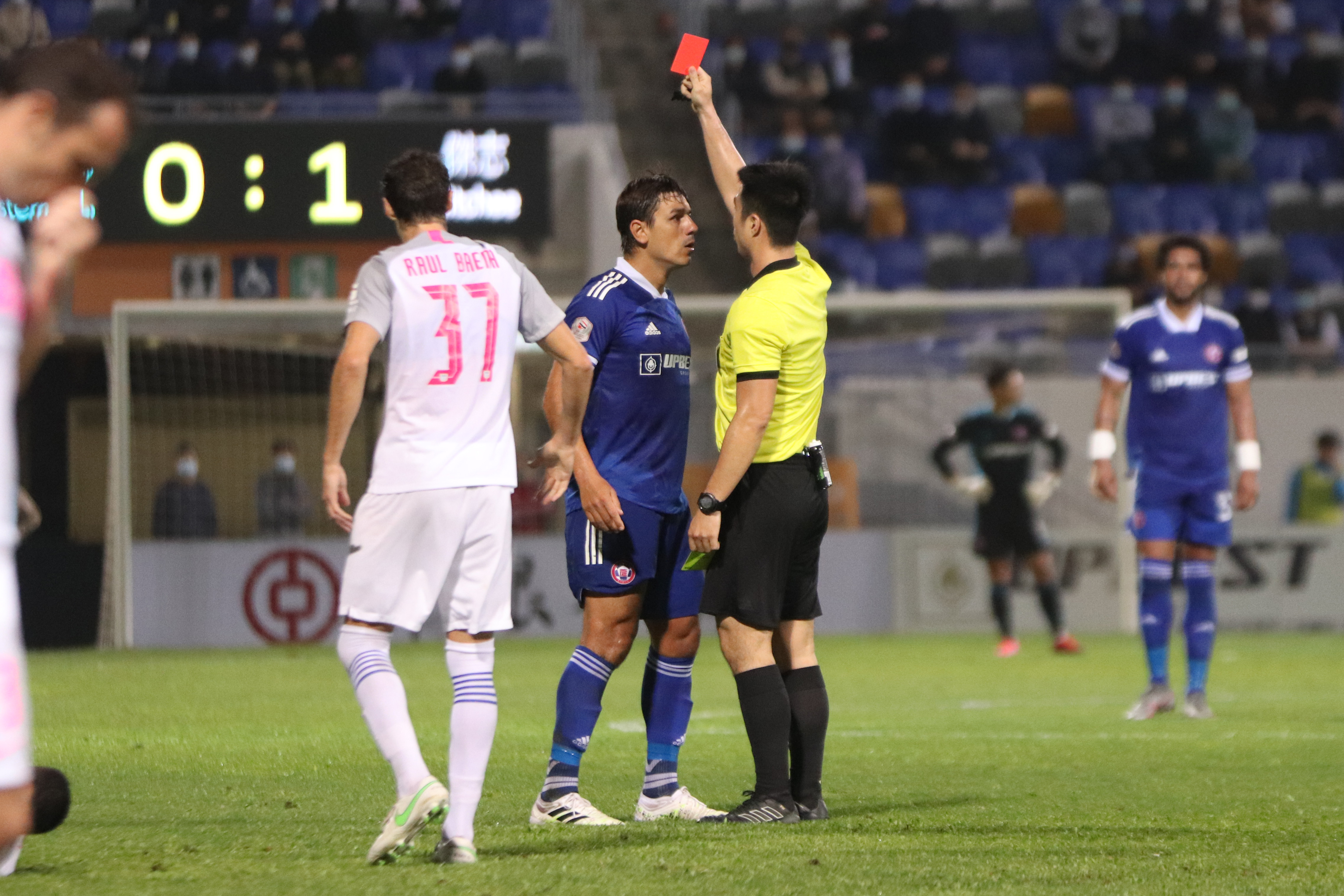
Diego getting sent off in the semi-final of 2020–21 Hong Kong Sapling Cup

After playing for several clubs in Brazil, Diego signed for Tuen Mun of Hong Kong First Division in 2012. In the following season, he signed with fellow Hong Kong First Division club Eastern on a free transfer.

On 1 June 2021, after staying at Eastern for 8 years, Diego signed for Lee Man.

On 18 July 2024, Diego joined Kowloon City.

On 1 September 2024, Diego scored against Tai Po on his debut for Kowloon City.

== International career ==
On 22 December 2019, after staying in Hong Kong for seven years, Diego confirmed that he had received his HKSAR passport, making him eligible to represent Hong Kong internationally.

On 17 May 2021, Diego received his first call-up alongside 2 teammates from Eastern to the Hong Kong national football team to play against Iran, Iraq and Bahrain for the 2022 World Cup qualifiers. On 3 June 2021, Diego made his international debut for Hong Kong against Iran.

== Career statistics ==
=== Club ===
As of match played 19 May 2024

Appearances and goals by club, season and competition
Club	Season	League			Senior Shield		League Cup		FA Cup		AFC Cup		Total	
Club	Season	Division	Apps	Goals	Apps	Goals	Apps	Goals	Apps	Goals	Apps	Goals	Apps	Goals
Tuen Mun	2012–13	Hong Kong First Division	17	0	2	0	—		2	1	—		18	1
Eastern	2013–14	Hong Kong First Division	18	1	2	0	—		4	0	—		24	1
Eastern	2014–15	Hong Kong Premier League	11	0	2	0	1	0	2	1	—		16	4
Eastern	2015–16	Hong Kong Premier League	13	5	3	0	3	0	1	0	—		20	5
Eastern	2016–17	Hong Kong Premier League	15	3	3	1	—		1	1	5	5	24	10
Eastern	2017–18	Hong Kong Premier League	13	0	3	0	—		1	0	1	1	19	1
Eastern	2018–19	Hong Kong Premier League	15	1	1	0	—		1	0	—		17	1
Eastern	2019–20	Hong Kong Premier League	9	3	3	0	—		4	1	—		16	4
Eastern	2020–21	Hong Kong Premier League	14	1	—		—		—		—		14	1
Eastern	Total		108	14	17	1	4	0	14	3	6	6	150	27
Lee Man	2021–22	Hong Kong Premier League	3	0	—		—		2	0	2	0	6	0
Lee Man	2022–23	Hong Kong Premier League	13	1	2	0	—		1	0	—		16	1
Lee Man	2023–24	Hong Kong Premier League	7	0	2	0	—		1	0	2	0	14	0
Lee Man	Total		23	1	4	0	—		5	0	4	0	36	1
Career total			148	15	23	1	4	0	21	4	10	6	204	29

=== International ===
As of matches played 11 June 2022

National team	Year	Apps	Goals
Hong Kong	2021	3	0
Hong Kong	2022	1	0
Total		4	0

#	Date	Venue	Opponent	Result	Competition
1	3 June 2021	Al Muharraq Stadium, Arad, Bahrain	Iran	1–3	2022 FIFA World Cup qualification – AFC second round
2	11 June 2021	Al Muharraq Stadium, Arad, Bahrain	Iraq	0–1	2022 FIFA World Cup qualification – AFC second round
3	15 June 2021	Bahrain National Stadium, Riffa, Bahrain	Bahrain	0–4	2022 FIFA World Cup qualification – AFC second round
4	11 June 2022	Salt Lake Stadium, Kolkata, India	Cambodia	3–0	2023 AFC Asian Cup qualification – third round

== Honours ==
=== Club ===
Eastern

- Hong Kong Premier League: 2015–16
- Hong Kong Senior Shield: 2014–15, 2015–16, 2019–20
- Hong Kong FA Cup: 2013–14, 2019–20
- Hong Kong Sapling Cup: 2020–21

Lee Man

- Hong Kong Premier League: 2023–24
