= Miroslav Šarić =

Croatian footballer

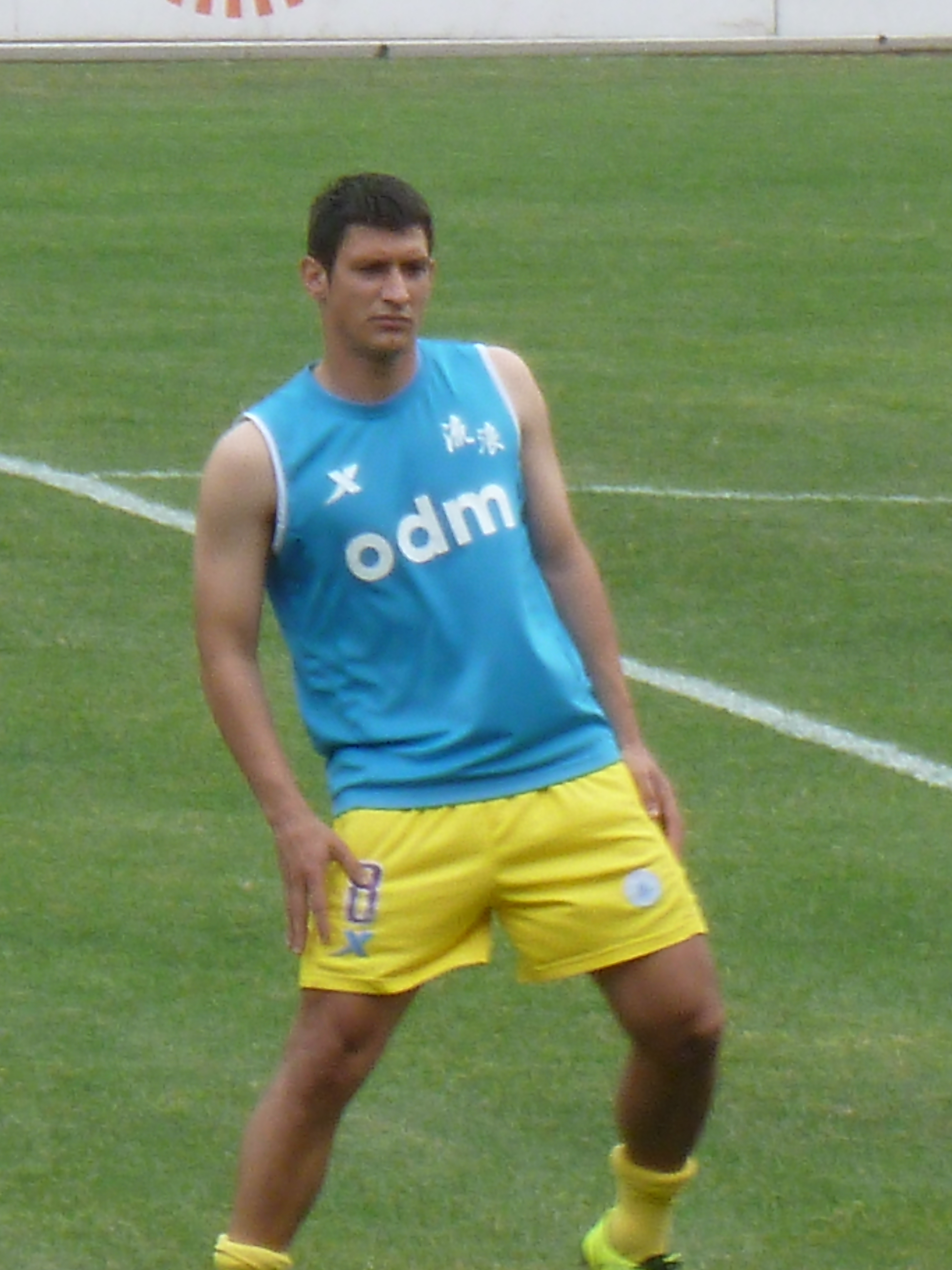

Personal information
- Date of birth: 7 February 1986 (age 40)
- Place of birth: Zagreb, SR Croatia, SFR Yugoslavia
- Height: 1.75 m (5 ft 9 in)
- Position: Midfielder

Team information
- Current team: Trešnjevka

Youth career
- Dinamo Zagreb

Senior career*
Years	Team	Apps	(Gls)
2004–2006	Dinamo Zagreb	11	(0)
2005	→ Međimurje (loan)	5	(0)
2006–2007	Kamen Ingrad	5	(1)
2007–2010	Inter Zaprešić	44	(8)
2011–2012	Lučko	22	(3)
2012–2014	Hong Kong Rangers	31	(10)
2014–2017	Eastern	31	(6)
2016	→ Metro Gallery (loan)		
2017	Krka	12	(3)
2018	Dugo Selo		
2018-2019	Trešnjevka		

International career
2002–2003	Croatia U17	16	(3)
2003–2005	Croatia U19	18	(3)
2006–2007	Croatia U20	4	(1)
- * Club domestic league appearances and goals as of 16 December 2022

Miroslav Šarić (born 7 February 1986) is a Croatian professional footballer who plays for Trešnjevka Zagreb.

== Club career ==
=== Croatia ===
On 15 December 2004, he made his debut for Dinamo Zagreb as an 83rd-minute substitute during the UEFA Cup group match against VfB Stuttgart. Since then, he didn't feature any matches for Dinamo Zagreb.

His name started to become popular in local when he was playing for Inter Zaprešić, when he featured in 13 matches and scored five goals in the 2009–10 season.

He joined another top division club, Lučko, in the summer of 2011. He earned 16 starts and scored three goals, although his performance could not help the team survive from relegation. He left the club after the season.

=== Hong Kong ===
On 17 August 2012, Šarić joined Hong Kong First Division League club Hong Kong Rangers FC for an undisclosed fee.

On 1 September 2012, he scored a goal on his debut match against Southern, which he started as an attacking midfielder and played for the whole match. He was released on 4 June 2014.

In the 2014–15 season he played for Eastern. Šarić left the club in May 2017 before the end of season playoffs.

== Honours ==
Eastern

- Hong Kong Senior Shield: 2014–15
- Hong Kong Premier League: 2015–16
