= Wong Chun Hin =

Hong Kong footballer (1995–2022)

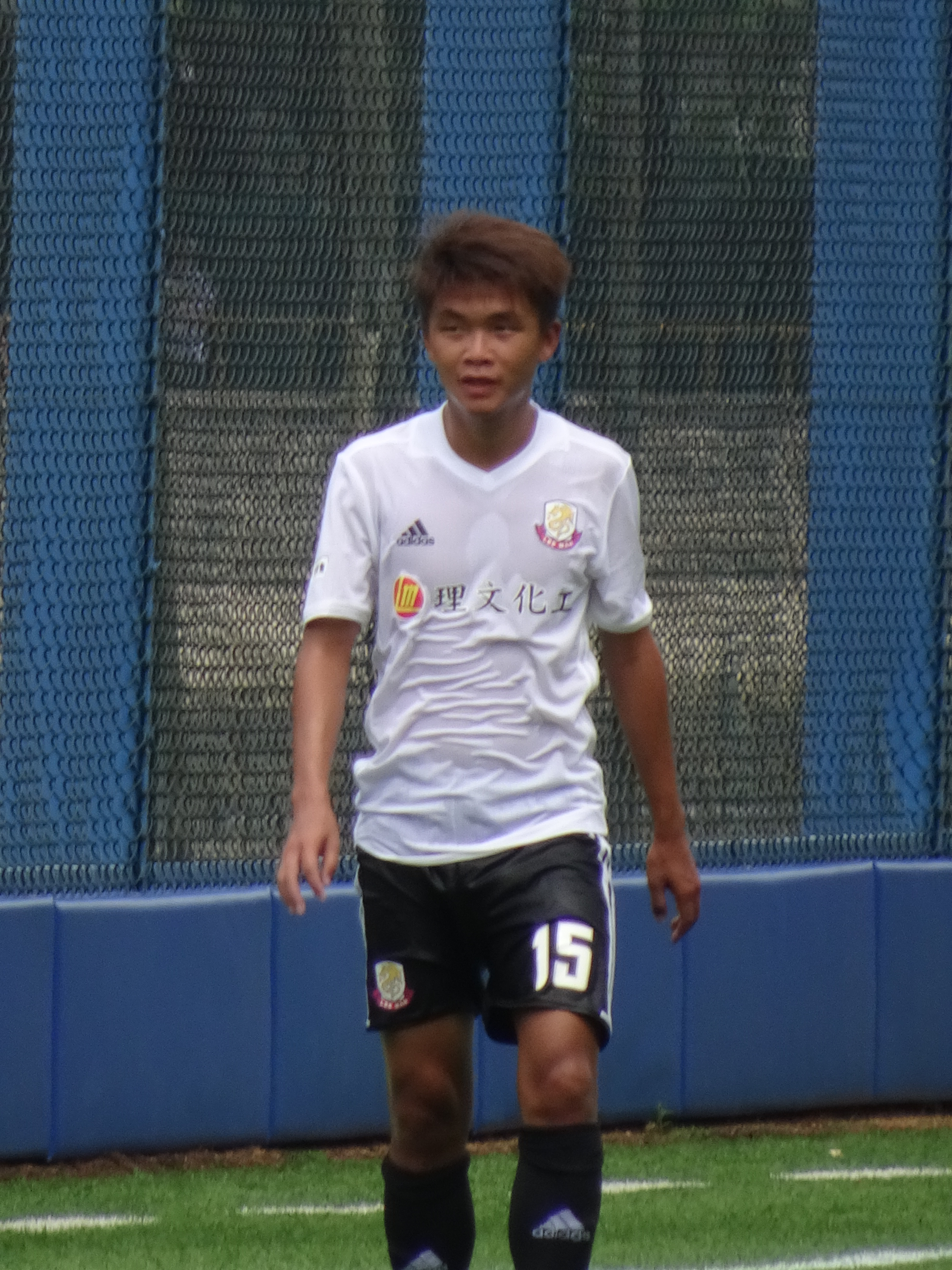
- Wong in 2017

Personal information
- Date of birth: 9 July 1995
- Place of birth: Hong Kong
- Date of death: 6 June 2022 (aged 26)
- Place of death: Tuen Mun, Hong Kong
- Height: 1.68 m (5 ft 6 in)
- Position: Midfielder

Youth career
- 2008–2009: Eastern

Senior career*
| Years | Team | Apps | (Gls) |
| 2009–2017 | Eastern | 44 | (9) |
| 2013–2014 | → Sun Hei (loan) | 10 | (1) |
| 2014–2016 | → Wong Tai Sin (loan) | 23 | (3) |
| 2016–2017 | → Hong Kong Rangers (loan) | 17 | (1) |
| 2017–2020 | Lee Man | 30 | (2) |
| 2020–2021 | Hong Kong Rangers | 17 | (1) |
| 2021 | Yau Tsim Mong | 12 | (8) |
| 2022 | Sham Shui Po | 0 | (0) |

International career^{‡}
| 2017 | Hong Kong U23 | 2 | (0) |
- * Club domestic league appearances and goals as of 30 May 2021 ‡ National team caps and goals as of 23 July 2017

Wong Chun Hin (Chinese: 黃駿軒; 9 July 1995 – 6 June 2022) was a Hong Kong professional footballer who played as a midfielder.

== Honours ==
Hong Kong

- Hong Kong–Macau Interport: 2014
