= Dylan Macallister =

Australian soccer player and coach

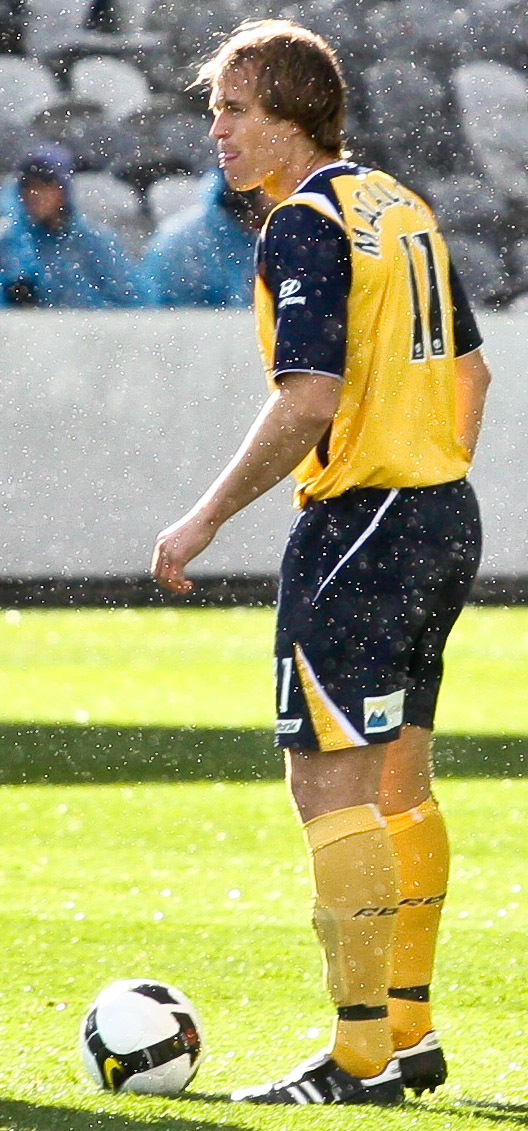
- Macallister playing for Central Coast Mariners in 2008

Personal information
- Full name: Dylan Jacob Macallister
- Date of birth: 17 May 1982 (age 44)
- Place of birth: Manly, New South Wales, Australia
- Height: 1.93 m (6 ft 4 in)
- Position: Striker

Youth career
- Manly United
- Sydney Olympic

Senior career*
Years	Team	Apps	(Gls)
1999–2001	Sydney Olympic	40	(10)
2002–2003	Northern Spirit	30	(5)
2004–2005	SK Brann	30	(4)
2006–2007	Lyn	13	(1)
2006	→ Sparta Sarpsborg (loan)	9	(2)
2008–2010	Central Coast Mariners	36	(5)
2010–2011	Wellington Phoenix	22	(7)
2011	Breiðablik	11	(3)
2011–2012	Gold Coast United	15	(3)
2012	Rockdale City Suns	7	(4)
2012–2014	Melbourne Heart	21	(1)
2014–2015	Eastern Salon	36	(12)
2015–2016	Rockdale City Suns	27	(8)
2016–2018	Manly United	41	(14)

International career
1999	Australia U-17	16	(6)
2004	Australia U-23	7	(6)
Medal record
Men's football
Representing Australia
FIFA U-17 World Championship
Runner-up	1999 New Zealand
- * Club domestic league appearances and goals as of 17 August 2018

Dylan Jacob Macallister (born 17 May 1982) is a retired Australian football (soccer) player who currently coaches for Manly United FC in the National Premier League. He previously played for Australian clubs Sydney Olympic, Northern Spirit, Central Coast Mariners and Melbourne Heart, New Zealand club Wellington Phoenix, Norwegian clubs SK Brann, Lyn and Sparta Sarpsborg, and Hong Kong club Eastern Salon.

He is the father of Australian professional footballer Matthias Macallister.

== Club career ==
=== Sydney Olympic ===
Macallister was born in Manly, New South Wales .As a youth, he played for his local Manly Warringah Dolphins before moving on to Sydney Olympic (then known as the Olympic Sharks). He marked his professional debut for the club in 1999 by scoring in his first appearance.

=== Northern Spirit ===
Having won the 2001–02 National Soccer League with the Sharks, Macallister proceeded to join another club from Sydney, the now defunct Northern Spirit. Macallister was then supposed to have left for Switzerland and FC Aarau in August, but immediately regretted signing the contract. The transfer was eventually called off and Macallister instead continued playing for Northern Spirit until he was bought by the Norwegian club Brann in February 2004.

=== SK Brann ===
After some initial success – he scored two goals against Molde in the second round of the 2004 season – Dylan figured mostly as a substitute. He scored 10 goals in 38 appearances which equates to approximately 20 matches in terms of playing time. Macallister's first season was blighted by a fatigue injury and after a good start to his second season he suffered a training injury, sidelining him for eight weeks.

=== FC Lyn ===
Macallister was sold to Lyn on 29 March 2006 and debuted in the season opener against Start. He appeared in the starting line-up in his third and fourth matches, scoring a fine goal in the fourth, but failed to become a regular.

Following the end of the transfer dispute over Mikel John Obi and subsequent return of Lyn's other Nigerian players, Chinedu Ogbuke and Ezekiel Bala, Dylan Macallister was one of three non-EU players on the team at a time when Norwegian clubs were only allowed two non-EU players in their matchday squads. He was therefore loaned out to the First Division club Sparta Sarpsborg, from 16 August until the end of the season.

=== Sparta Sarpsborg ===
During his stay at Sparta he made nine appearances, scoring two goals. Sparta retained their spot in the league, but Macallister's season ended on a dull note as he was sent off in his last game. He returned to Lyn for the 2007 season, but made just five league appearances for the club, scoring no goals.

=== Central Coast Mariners ===
His contract with Lyn originally lasted to the end of the 2008 season, but it was announced on 28 March that he was released of his contract, and had signed with Australian A-League club Central Coast Mariners. He scored two goals on debut for the Mariners against the Queensland Roar.

=== Wellington Phoenix ===
On 13 May 2010, it was announced that Macallister had signed a contract with the Wellington Phoenix, bringing him to the New Zealand capital to play as a target-man. During a highly publicised pre-season match against Argentine side Boca Juniors in 2010, Macallister scored the opening goal in the 24th minute as Phoenix went on to win 2–1. He scored seven league goals in 14 starts during his time with the Phoenix.

=== Breiðablik ===
Macallister signed for Icelandic champions Breiðablik on 16 May 2011. He made his debut on 22 May in a 3–1 win against Fylkir.

On 20 July 2011, Macallister scored Breiðablik's first ever goal in a European Competition, in a 2–0 win against Norwegian champions Rosenborg.

=== Gold Coast United ===
On 11 August 2011 it was announced he had signed a contract with A-League outfit Gold Coast United, scoring 5 goals in 15 appearances in the 2011/12 season.

=== Rockdale City Suns ===
On 25 May 2012, Macallister joined the NSW Premier League side Rockdale City Suns to maintain match fitness before his next top level stint. He scored 4 goals in 5 games.

=== Melbourne Heart ===
Macallister played for the A-League side Melbourne Heart in their opening game of the 2012/13 season against the Melbourne Victory, which they won 2–1; Macallister scored the winning goal in first half stoppage time. Now also runs a boys soccer team with former Albion Rovers legend Mark Leonard.

=== Eastern Salon ===
Macallister was released by Melbourne Heart and joined Eastern Salon in January 2014. During his time with the club, he became a popular figure among supporters, who created a chant in his honor.

=== Return to Rockdale ===
Macallister signed for Rockdale City Suns in the National Premier Leagues NSW for the remainder of the 2015 NSW NPL season and the 2015 FFA Cup.

== International career ==
Dylan Macallister has made several appearances for Australia's various age-specific teams. He participated in the 1999 FIFA U-17 World Championship, scoring three goals for his national side. Australia would go on to finish as runners-up behind Brazil. He later played for the U-20 team in the 2001 FIFA World Youth Championship. In the qualifiers for the 2004 Olympic Football Tournament he became Australia's top scorer with six goals in seven matches.

Macallister earned his first call-up to the Socceroo squad in 2009. He was an unused substitute in an Asian Cup qualifier against Indonesia in Jakarta on 28 January 2009.

== Career statistics ==
As of 19 January 2015

Club performance			League		Cup		League Cup		Other		Continental		Total	
Season	Club	League	Apps	Goals	Apps	Goals	Apps	Goals	Apps	Goals	Apps	Goals	Apps	Goals
Australia			League		Cup		League Cup		Other		Oceania/Asia		Total	
1999–00	Sydney Olympic	National Soccer League	2	1	0	0	0	0	0	0	0	0	2	1
2000–01	Sydney Olympic	National Soccer League	18	3	0	0	0	0	0	0	0	0	18	3
2001–02	Sydney Olympic	National Soccer League	20	6	0	0	0	0	0	0	0	0	20	6
2002–03	Northern Spirit FC	National Soccer League	17	1	0	0	0	0	0	0	0	0	17	1
2003–04	Northern Spirit FC	National Soccer League	13	4	0	0	0	0	0	0	0	0	13	4
Total	Australia		70	15	0	0	0	0	0	0	0	0	70	15
Norway			League		Cup		League Cup		Other		UEFA		Total	
2004	SK Brann	Tippeligaen	14	2	3	2	0	0	0	0	0	0	17	4
2005	SK Brann	Tippeligaen	16	2	2	3	7	2	0	0	2	1	27	8
2006	FC Lyn	Tippeligaen	8	1	2	1	0	0	0	0	0	0	10	2
2006	Sparta Sarpsborg (loan)	Adeccoligaen	9	2	0	0	0	0	0	0	0	0	9	2
2007	FC Lyn	Tippeligaen	5	0	2	1	0	0	0	0	0	0	7	1
Total	Norway		52	7	9	7	7	2	0	0	2	1	70	17
Australia			League		Cup		League Cup		Other		Oceania/Asia		Total	
2008–09	Central Coast Mariners	A-League	19	4	3	1	0	0	0	0	0	0	22	5
2009–10	Central Coast Mariners	A-League	17	1	0	0	0	0	0	0	4	0	21	1
2010–11	Wellington Phoenix	A-League	22	7	0	0	0	0	0	0	0	0	22	7
Total	Australia		58	12	3	1	0	0	0	0	4	0	65	13
Iceland			League		Cup		League Cup		Other		UEFA		Total	
2011	Breiðablik	Úrvalsdeild	11	3	2	0	0	0	0	0	2	1	15	4
Total	Iceland		11	3	2	0	0	0	0	0	2	1	15	4
Australia			League		Cup		League Cup		Other		Oceania/Asia		Total	
2011–12	Gold Coast United	A-League	15	3	0	0	0	0	0	0	0	0	15	3
2012–03	Melbourne Heart	A-League	20	1	0	0	0	0	0	0	0	0	20	1
2013–14	Melbourne Heart	A-League	1	0	0	0	0	0	0	0	0	0	1	0
Total	Australia		36	4	0	0	0	0	0	0	0	0	36	4
Hong Kong			League		Cup		League Cup		Other		UEFA		Total	
2013–14	Eastern Sports Club	Hong Kong Premier League	10	2	4	4	0	0	2	1	0	0	16	7
2014–15	Eastern Sports Club	Hong Kong Premier League	8	1	0	0	1	1	3	2	0	0	12	4
Total	Hong Kong		18	3	4	4	1	1	5	3	0	0	28	11
Career total			245	44	18	12	8	3	5	3	8	1	284	63

== Honours ==
=== Club ===
Sydney Olympic

- NSL Championship (1): 2001–2002

Brann

- Norwegian Cup (1): 2004

Eastern Sports Club

- Hong Kong Senior Shield 2014–15
- Hong Kong FA Cup 2013–14

=== International ===
Australia

- FIFA U-17 World Championship (1): 1999 (runners-up)
