= Yiu Hok Man =

Hong Kong association football player

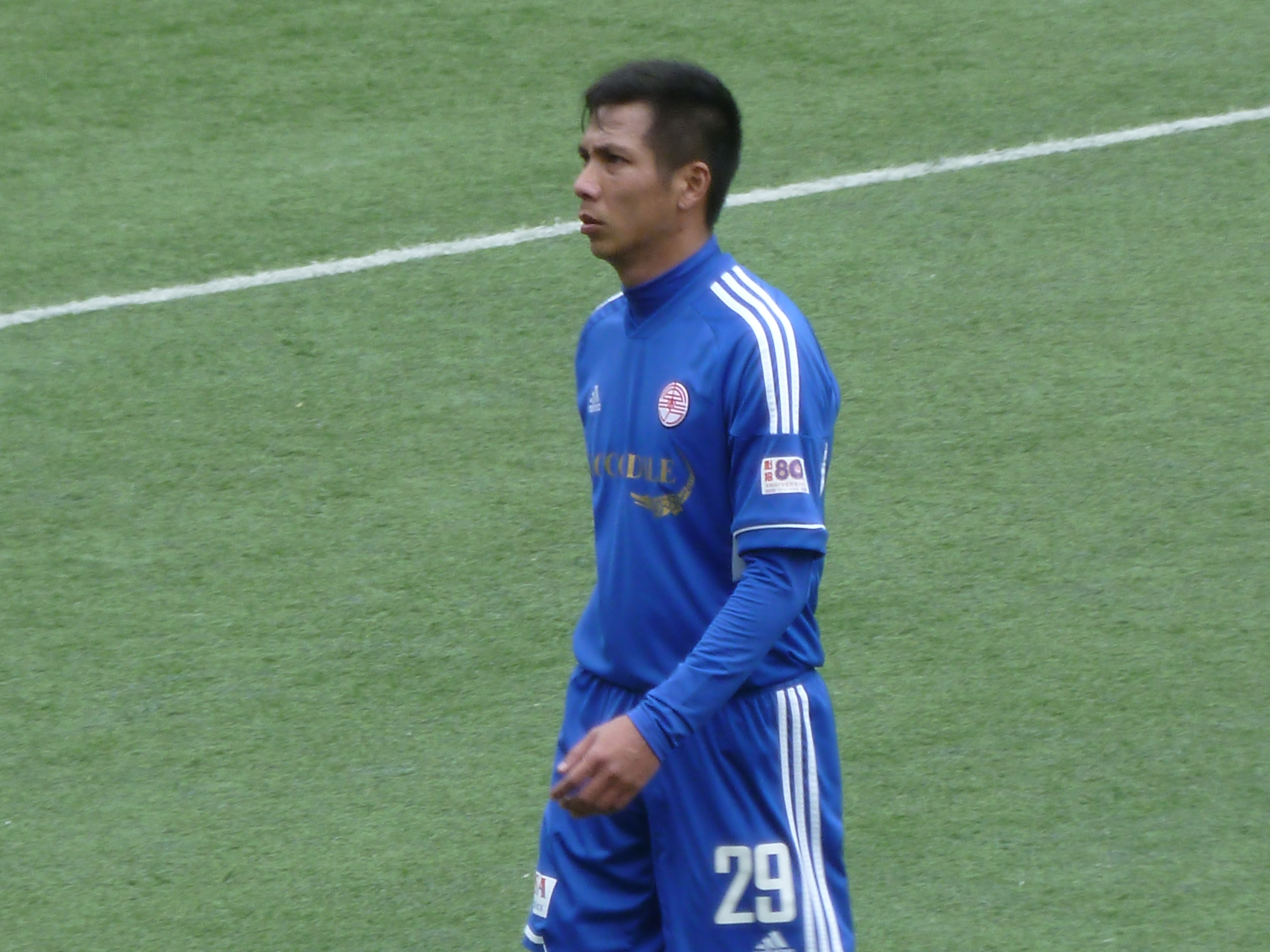

Personal information
- Full name: Yiu Hok Man
- Date of birth: 9 February 1978 (age 48)
- Place of birth: Hong Kong
- Height: 1.75 m (5 ft 9 in)
- Positions: Midfielder; winger; forward

Youth career
- Hong Kong Sports Institute

Senior career*
Years	Team	Apps	(Gls)
1996–1997	Rangers (HKG)		
1997–2001	Double Flower		
2001–2002	Sun Hei		
2002–2006	Fire Services	12	(1)
2006–2007	Vong Chiu		
2007–2008	Mutual	8	(3)
2008–2009	Tai Chung	16	(5)
2009–2011	Double Flower	32	(5)
2011	Hoi Fan		
2012	Lam Pak		
2012–2015	Eastern	39	(14)
2016–2020	St Joseph's	5	(0)
2021	Kui Tan		
2023	Sai Kung	5	(3)

International career
1999–2001	Hong Kong	7	(0)
- * Club domestic league appearances and goals

Yiu Hok Man (Chinese: 姚學文; born 9 February 1978) is a former Hong Kong professional footballer who played as a midfielder, winger or forward.

== Club career ==
In 1997, Yiu won the 1996–97 Hong Kong Best Player award. In 2001, he signed for Hong Kong top flight side Sun Hei, helping them win their first league title. In 2002, he signed for Fire Services in the Hong Kong second tier, helping them earn promotion to the Hong Kong top flight. In 2011, he signed for Macau club Hoi Fan.

In 2012, Yiu signed for Eastern, where he helped the club win the 2014–15 Hong Kong Senior Challenge Shield and 2013–14 Hong Kong FA Cup. On 1 September 2013, he played for Eastern during a 2–1 win over Tuen Mun. On 7 December 2014, Yiu scored the first 3 goals for Eastern during a 7–1 win over Tai Po. After that, he signed for Hong Kong third tier team St Joseph's.
