= Lee Sze Ming =

Hong Kong footballer (born 1979)

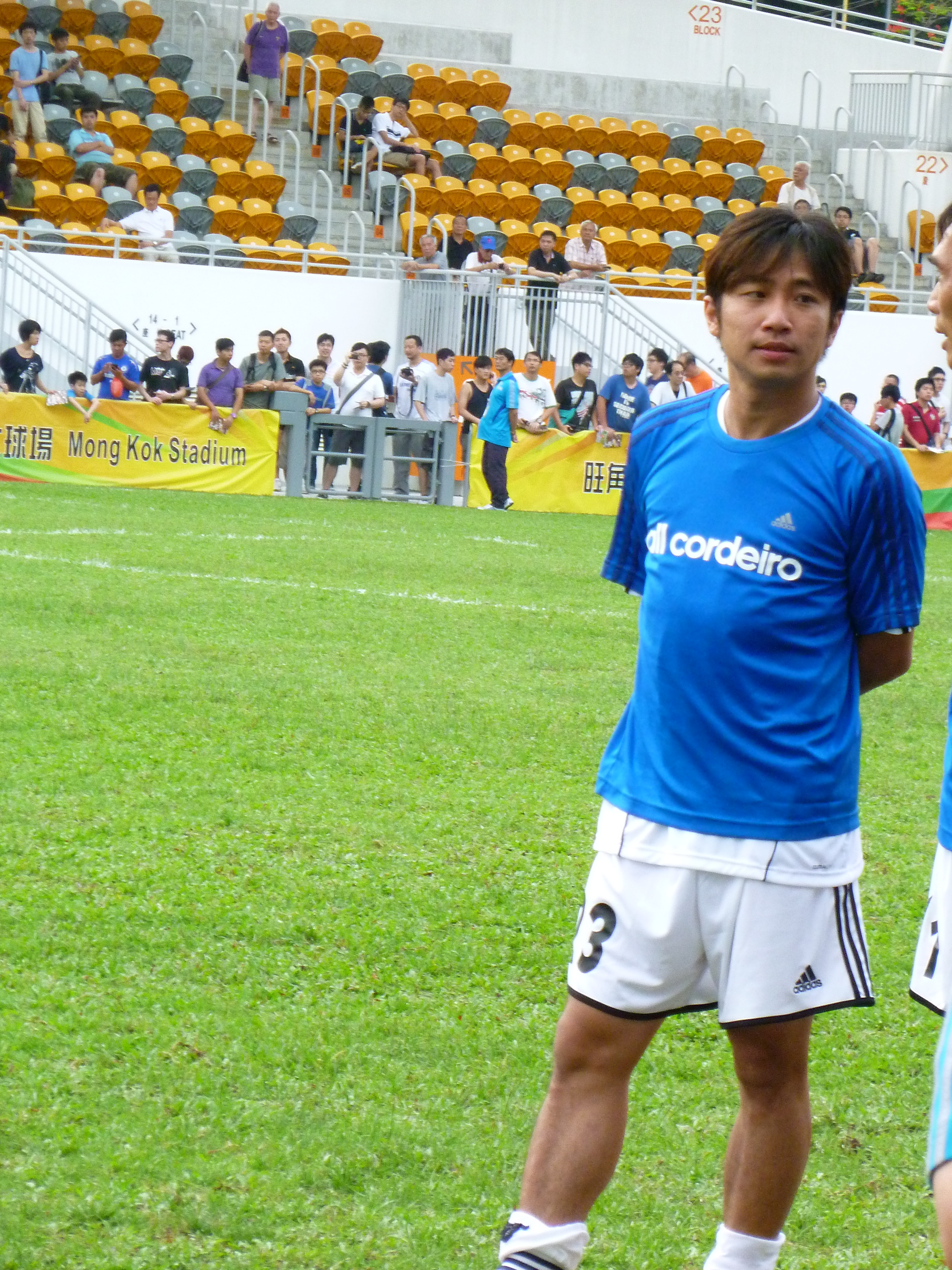
- Sze Ming in June 2012

Personal information
- Date of birth: 5 February 1979 (age 47)
- Place of birth: Hong Kong
- Height: 1.73 m (5 ft 8 in)
- Position: Attacking midfielder

Youth career
- –1996: South China

Senior career*
Years	Team	Apps	(Gls)
1996–1997	→ Eastern (loan)	?	(1)
1997–1999	South China	?	(0)
1999–2000	Sai Kung	?	(4)
2000–2001	South China	25	(1)
2001–2002	Double Flower	?	(?)
2002–2003	Fukien	18	(1)
2003–2004	Rangers (HKG)	13	(4)
2004–2007	Happy Valley	57	(5)
2007–2008	Convoy Sun Hei	0	(0)
2007–2008	→ Eastern (loan)	23	(1)
2008–2009	Mutual	22	(1)
2009–2012	Double Flower	0	(0)
2010	→ Lam Pak (loan)	7	(3)
2012	Kuan Tai	0	(0)
2012–2014	Eastern	0	(0)
2024–	Kui Tan	1	(0)

International career^{‡}
2005–2007	Hong Kong	10	(2)
- * Club domestic league appearances and goals as of 23 February 2008 ‡ National team caps and goals as of 30 March 2008

Lee Sze Ming (Chinese: 李思明; Jyutping: lei^{5} si^{1} ming^{4}; born 5 February 1979 in Hong Kong) is a Hong Kong former professional footballer. He played a variety of positions (all attacking positions), mostly as a forward and right wing.

Lee also played for the Hong Kong futsal team.

== Honours ==
South China

- Hong Kong Senior Shield: 1998–99

Happy Valley

- Hong Kong First Division: 2005–06

Eastern

- Hong Kong Senior Shield: 2007–08

== Career statistics ==
=== Club career ===
Updated 23 February 2008

Club	Season	No.	League		League Cup		Senior Shield		FA Cup		AFC Cup		Total	
Club	Season	No.	Apps	Goals	Apps	Goals	Apps	Goals	Apps	Goals	Apps	Goals	Apps	Goals
Happy Valley	2004–05	23	?	?	?	?	?	?	?	?	?	0	?	?
Happy Valley	2005–06	23	7	1	2	0	2	0	3	0	6	1	20	2
Happy Valley	2006–07	23	?	2	?	0	?	0	?	0	?	1	?	3
Happy Valley	Total													
Convoy Sun Hei	2007–08	—	—	—	—	—	—	—	—	—	—	—	—	—
Convoy Sun Hei	Total													
Eastern (loan)	2007–08	8	?	1	4	0	3	0	—	—	—	—	?	1
Eastern (loan)	Total													
Career Total														

=== International career ===
Updated 24 February 2008

#	Date	Venue	Opponents	Result	Goals	Competition
1	9 February 2005	Hong Kong, Hong Kong	Brazil	1–7	1	2005 Carlsberg Cup
2	12 August 2006	Hong Kong, Hong Kong	Singapore	1–2	1	Friendly
3	16 August 2006		Uzbekistan	2–2	0	2007 Asian Cup Qual.
4	6 September 2006	Hong Kong, Hong Kong	Uzbekistan	0–0	0	2007 Asian Cup Qual.
5	11 October 2006	Doha, Qatar	Qatar	0–2	0	2007 Asian Cup Qual.
6	15 November 2006	Hong Kong, Hong Kong	Bangladesh	2–0	0	2007 Asian Cup Qual.
7	21 October 2007	Gianyar, Indonesia	Timor-Leste	3–2	0	FIFA World Cup 2010 Qual.
8	28 October 2007	Hong Kong, Hong Kong	Timor-Leste	8–1	0	FIFA World Cup 2010 Qual.
9	10 November 2007	Hong Kong, Hong Kong	Turkmenistan	0–0	0	FIFA World Cup 2010 Qual.
10	18 November 2007	Ashgabat, Turkmenistan	Turkmenistan	0–3	0	FIFA World Cup 2010 Qual.
