= Li Hon Ho =

Hong Kong footballer

Li Hon Ho 李瀚灝
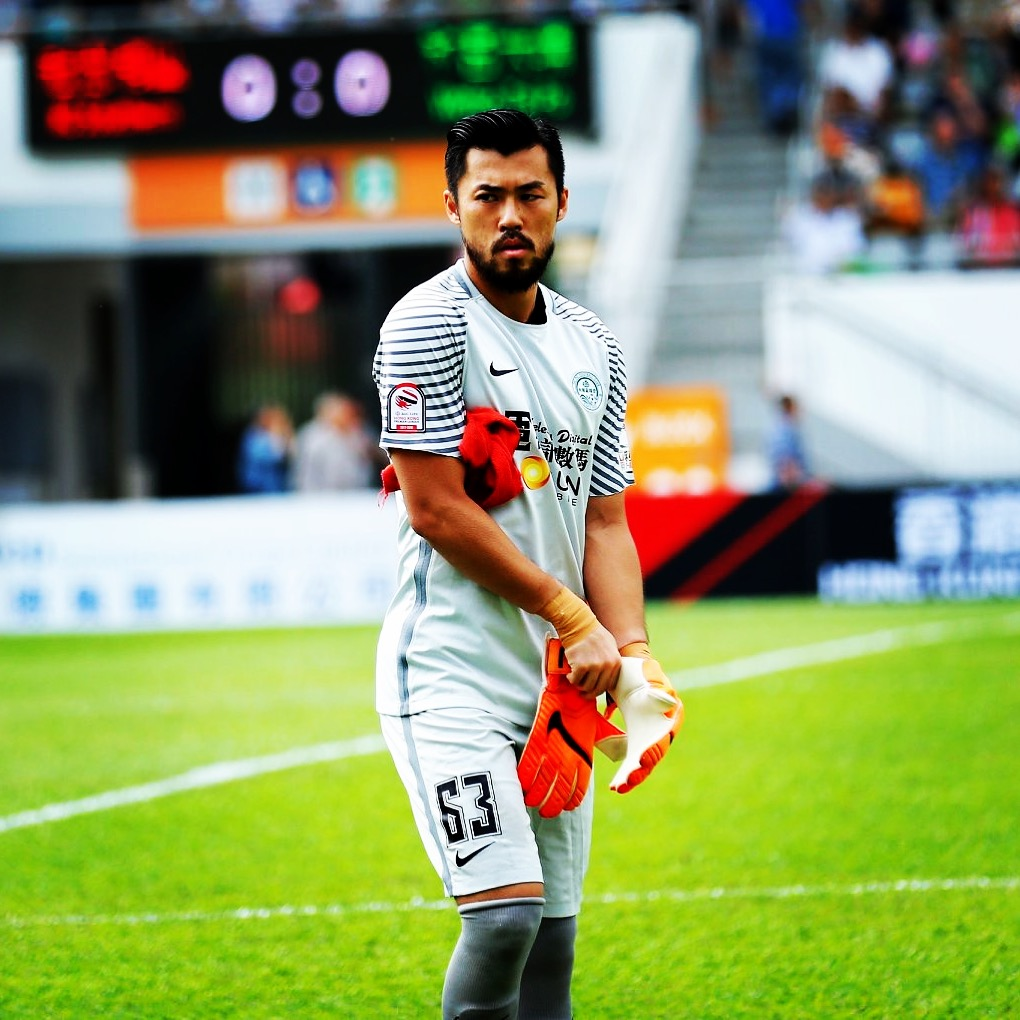

Personal information
- Full name: Dell Li Hon Ho
- Date of birth: 14 July 1986 (age 40)
- Place of birth: Hong Kong
- Height: 1.77 m (5 ft 9 1/2 in)
- Position: Goalkeeper

Team information
- Current team: North District
- Number: 63

Senior career*
Years	Team	Apps	(Gls)
2002–2004	Hong Kong 08		
2004–2006	Sun Hei	0	(0)
2006–2010	Tai Po	72	(0)
2010–2011	Pegasus	14	(0)
2011–2013	Tai Po	29	(0)
2013–2015	Eastern	15	(0)
2015–2019	Tai Po	55	(0)
2019–2020	Lee Man	0	(0)
2020–2023	Tai Po	36	(0)
2023–2024	Central & Western	17	(0)
2024–2025	Kowloon City	11	(0)
2025–	North District	22	(0)

International career^{‡}
- Hong Kong U-23
2008	Hong Kong	1	(0)
Medal record
Representing Hong Kong
East Asian Games
Gold medal – first place	2009 Hong Kong	Football
- * Club domestic league appearances and goals as of 20 November 2026 ‡ National team caps and goals as of 19 November 2008

Dell Li Hon Ho (Chinese: 李瀚灝; Jyutping: lei^{5} hon^{6} hou^{6}; born 14 July 1986) is a Hong Kong professional footballer who currently plays as a goalkeeper for Hong Kong Premier League club North District.

== Club career ==
On 30 May 2010, Li joined Pegasus as Yapp Hung Fai's replacement.

In June 2011, Li returned to Tai Po. Following Tai Po's relegation to the Second Division, Li joined newly promoted First Division side Eastern on 2 June 2013.

On 19 July 2019, Li moved to Lee Man. On 2 June 2020, Li was named on a list of departures from the club.

On 16 August 2020, Li revealed that he had retired from football upon the end of his contract with Lee Man. He is now an insurance broker.

In May 2023, Li announced his retirement from professional football once again, then signed for Hong Kong First Division club Central & Western.

On 18 July 2024, Li returned to professional football again and joined Kowloon City.

On 23 July 2025, Li joined North District.

== International career ==
Since Li's performance was well in the club, head coaches of Hong Kong, Dejan Antonić and Goran Paulić, decided to pick him up into the main team squad. On 19 November 2008, he played against Macau in his one and only appearance for Hong Kong.

== Career statistics ==
=== International ===
As of 19 November 2008

Date	Venue	Opponent	Result	Competition
19 November 2008	Macau UST Stadium, Macau	Macau	9–1	Friendly

== Honours ==
=== Club ===
Sun Hei

- Hong Kong Senior Shield: 2004–05
- Hong Kong FA Cup: 2004–05, 2005–06
- Hong Kong League Cup: 2004–05

Tai Po

- Hong Kong Premier League: 2018–19
- Hong Kong First Division: 2015–16
- Hong Kong Senior Shield: 2012–13
- Hong Kong FA Cup: 2008–09
- Hong Kong Sapling Cup: 2016–17

Eastern

- Hong Kong Senior Shield: 2014–15
- Hong Kong FA Cup: 2013–14

=== International ===
- East Asian Games: 2009

=== Individual ===
- Best Young Player: 2009

Preceded by Lo Chun Kit; Kwok Kin Pong	Hong Kong Top Footballer Awards Best Youth Player; 2008–09 with Au Yeung Yiu Chung	Succeeded by Yapp Hung Fai; Kwok Kin Pong
