= Leung Kwok Wai =

Hong Kong footballer (born 1986)

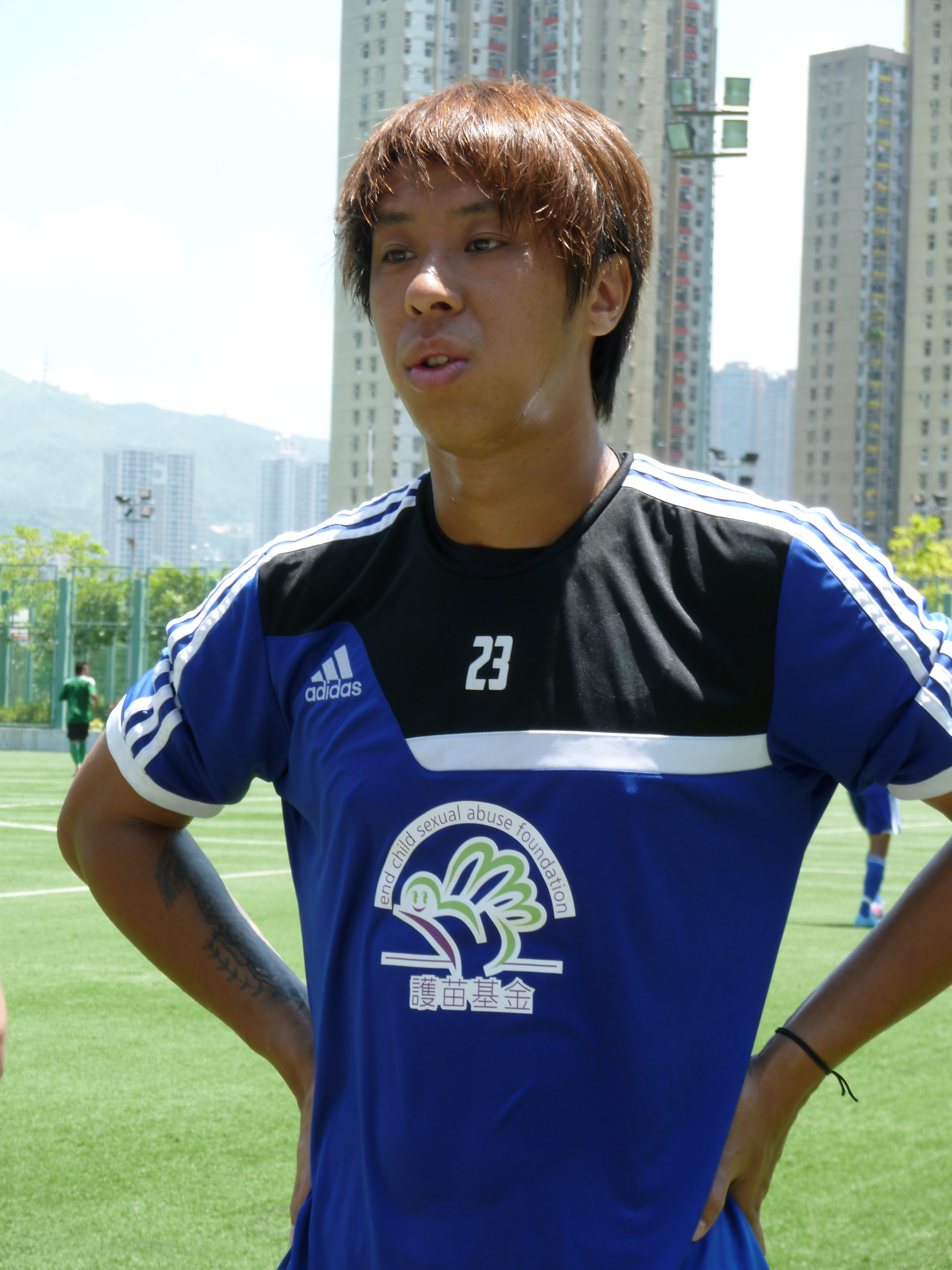

Personal information
- Full name: Leung Kwok Wai
- Date of birth: 23 February 1986 (age 40)
- Place of birth: Hong Kong
- Height: 1.83 m (6 ft 0 in)
- Position: Centre back

Senior career*
Years	Team	Apps	(Gls)
2006–2012	Tuen Mun	86	(14)
2012–2013	Yokohama FC Hong Kong	14	(0)
2013–2015	Eastern	21	(1)
2015–2016	Dreams Metro Gallery	14	(1)
2016–2017	Pegasus	1	(0)
2017–2019	Dreams FC	24	(0)
2019–2023	North District	53	(2)
2023–	Double Flower		
- * Club domestic league appearances and goals as of 16 May 2026

Leung Kwok Wai (Chinese: 梁國威; Jyutping: loeng^{4} gwok^{3} wai^{1} ; born 23 February 1986) is a Hong Kong former professional footballer who played as a defender.

== Club career ==
=== Tuen Mun ===
Leung, starter his football career at Tuen Mun. Later, he joined the club in 2006, when the club were still competing in the Third 'District' Division. He was one of the three players who helped the club promote to the First Division from Third Division. Since his arrival at the club, he was the first choice centre-back of the club, even when the club were competing in the First Division. However, Tuen Mun confirmed his departure after the end of the 2011–12 season, stating that the club wanted to make a change.

=== Yokohama FC Hong Kong ===
Leung, along with his Tuen Mun centre-back partner Čedomir Mijanović, joined fellow First Division club Yokohama FC Hong Kong.

=== Eastern ===
On 11 June 2013, Leung joined newly promoted First Division club Eastern on a free transfer.

=== Dreams FC ===
On 18 July 2017, Leung joined newly rebranded HKPL club Dreams FC.

== Career stats ==
=== Club ===
As of 4 May 2013

Club	Season	Division	League		Senior Shield		League Cup		FA Cup		AFC Cup		Others^{1}		Total	
Club	Season	Division	Apps	Goals	Apps	Goals	Apps	Goals	Apps	Goals	Apps	Goals	Apps	Goals	Apps	Goals
Tuen Mun	2006–07	Third 'District' Division	13	2	3^{2}	0^{2}	N/A	N/A	N/A	N/A	N/A	N/A	N/A	N/A	16	2
Tuen Mun	2007–08	Third 'District' Division	15	5	1^{2}	0^{2}	N/A	N/A	N/A	N/A	N/A	N/A	N/A	N/A	16	5
Tuen Mun	2008–09	Third 'District' Division	13	3	1^{2}	0^{2}	N/A	N/A	N/A	N/A	N/A	N/A	3	0	17	3
Tuen Mun	2009–10	Second Division	15	3	—^{3}		N/A	N/A	N/A	N/A	N/A	N/A	N/A	N/A	15	3
Tuen Mun	2010–11	First Division	16	1	1	0	1	0	2	1	N/A	N/A	N/A	N/A	20	2
Tuen Mun	2011–12	First Division	14	0	5	0	3	0	1	0	N/A	N/A	N/A	N/A	23	0
Tuen Mun Total			86	14	8	0	2	0	3	1	0	0	3	0	102	15
Yokohama FC Hong Kong	2012–13	First Division	14	0	2	0	—	—	2	0	N/A	N/A	N/A	N/A	18	0
Yokohama FC Hong Kong Total			14	0	2	0	0	0	2	0	0	0	0	0	18	0
Eastern Salon	2013–14	First Division	0	0	0	0	—	—	0	0	N/A	N/A	N/A	N/A	0	0
Eastern Total			0	0	0	0	0	0	0	0	0	0	0	0	0	0
Total			100	14	13	0	3	0	5	1	0	0	3	0	124	15

== Personal life ==
On 25 October 2012, Leung and his wife Fiona Wong married after 3 years of dating.

== Notes ==
1. Others include Hong Kong Third Division Champion Play-off.
2. Since Tuen Mun were competing in lower divisions, they could only join the Junior Shield instead of Senior Shield.
3. Hong Kong Junior Challenge Shield was not held in the 2009–10 season.
