= Wong Chi Chung =

Hong Kong footballer

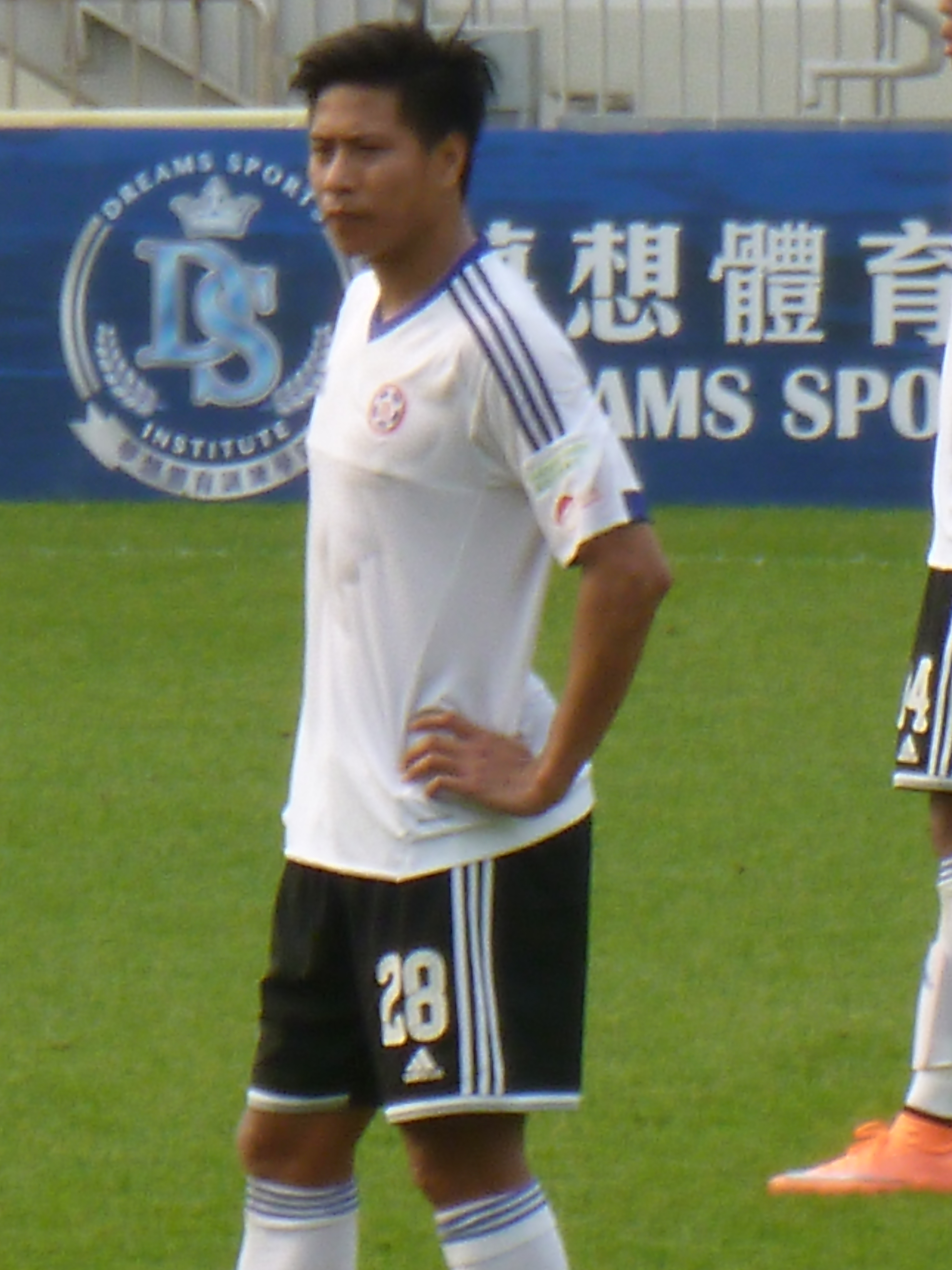

Personal information
- Date of birth: 11 October 1982 (age 44)
- Place of birth: Tuen Mun, Hong Kong
- Height: 1.78 m (5 ft 10 in)
- Position: Centre-back

Team information
- Current team: North District

Senior career*
Years	Team	Apps	(Gls)
2004–2005	Mutual		
2005–2006	Eastern	1	(0)
2006–2007	Fukien	4	(0)
2007–2008	Tuen Mun	13	(2)
2008–2009	Mutual	19	(0)
2009–2010	Double Flower	16	(0)
2010–2014	Tuen Mun	48	(0)
2014–2017	Eastern	14	(0)
2017–2018	Dreams	13	(0)
2019–2021	North District	23	(2)
2021–2022	Yau Tsim Mong	5	(0)
2022	North District		
2022–2024	3 Sing	37	(4)
2024–2025	Kui Tang		
2025–	Ravia		
- * Club domestic league appearances and goals as of 1 January 2019

Mimi Wong Chi Chung (Chinese: 黃志聰; born 11 October 1982 in Hong Kong) is a Hong Kong former professional football player.

== Club career ==
In 2004, Wong signed with Hong Kong First Division club Mutual when he was 26 years old, after this season, Wong returned to Hong Kong Second Division.

In 2010, Wong signed for First Division club Tuen Mun.

In 2014, Wong signed for Hong Kong Premier League club Eastern.

In 2015, Wong got more and more chance to play for Eastern.

In 2017, Wong was signed by Dreams.

On New Years Day 2019, Wong announced his retirement from professional football.
