= Santo Antônio da Platina =

Coordinates: 23°16′S 50°06′W

- Municipality
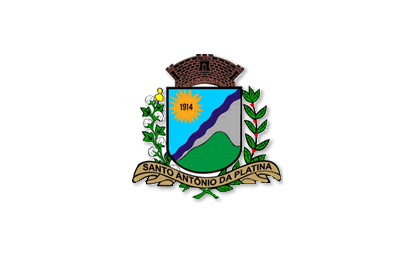
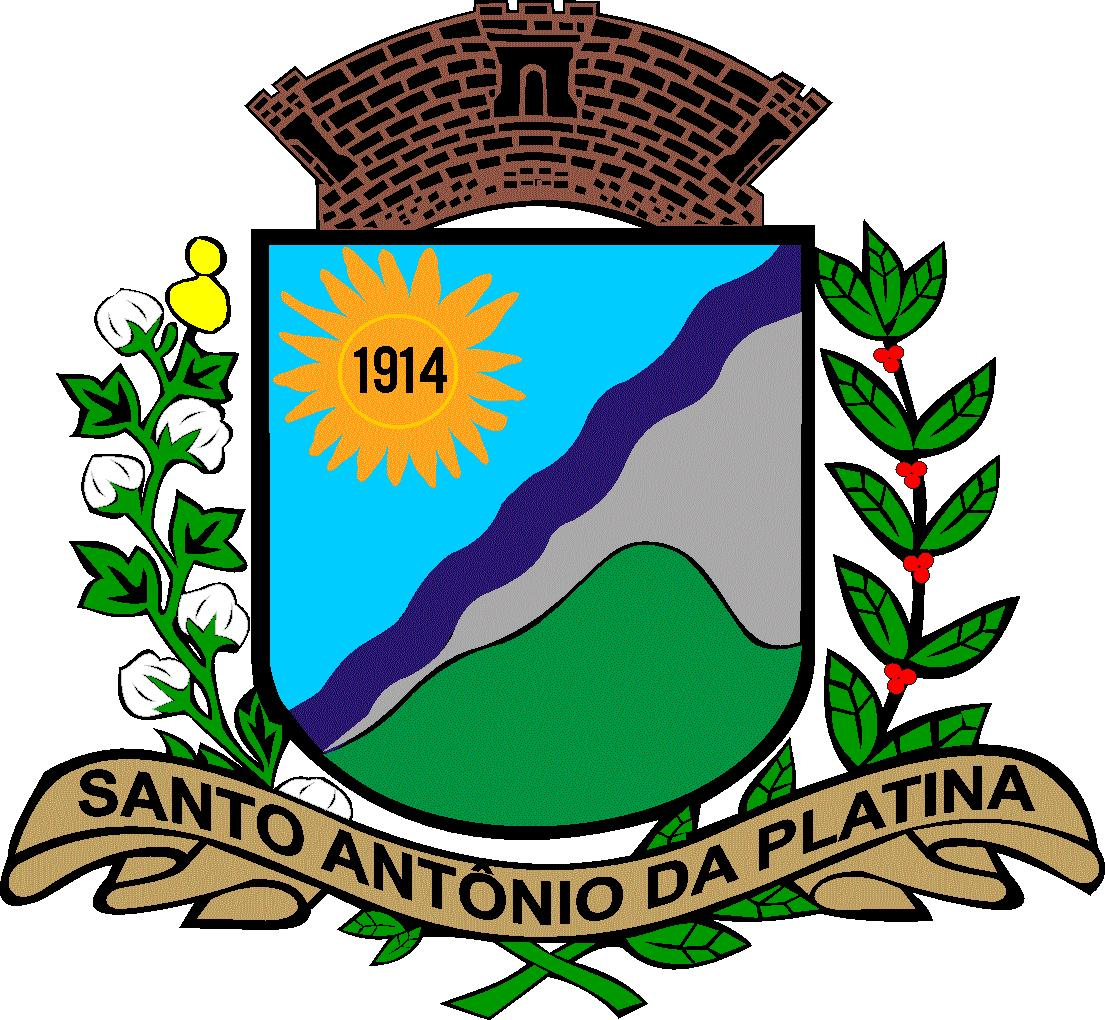
- Flag Coat of arms
- Interactive map of Santo Antônio da Platina
- Country: Brazil
- Region: Southern
- State: Paraná
- Mesoregion: Norte Pioneiro Paranaense

Population (2020)
  - Total: 46,251
- Time zone: UTC−3 (BRT)

Santo Antônio da Platina is a municipality in the state of Paraná in the Southern Region of Brazil.

== See also ==
- List of municipalities in Paraná
