= Wong Tsz Ho =

Hong Kong footballer

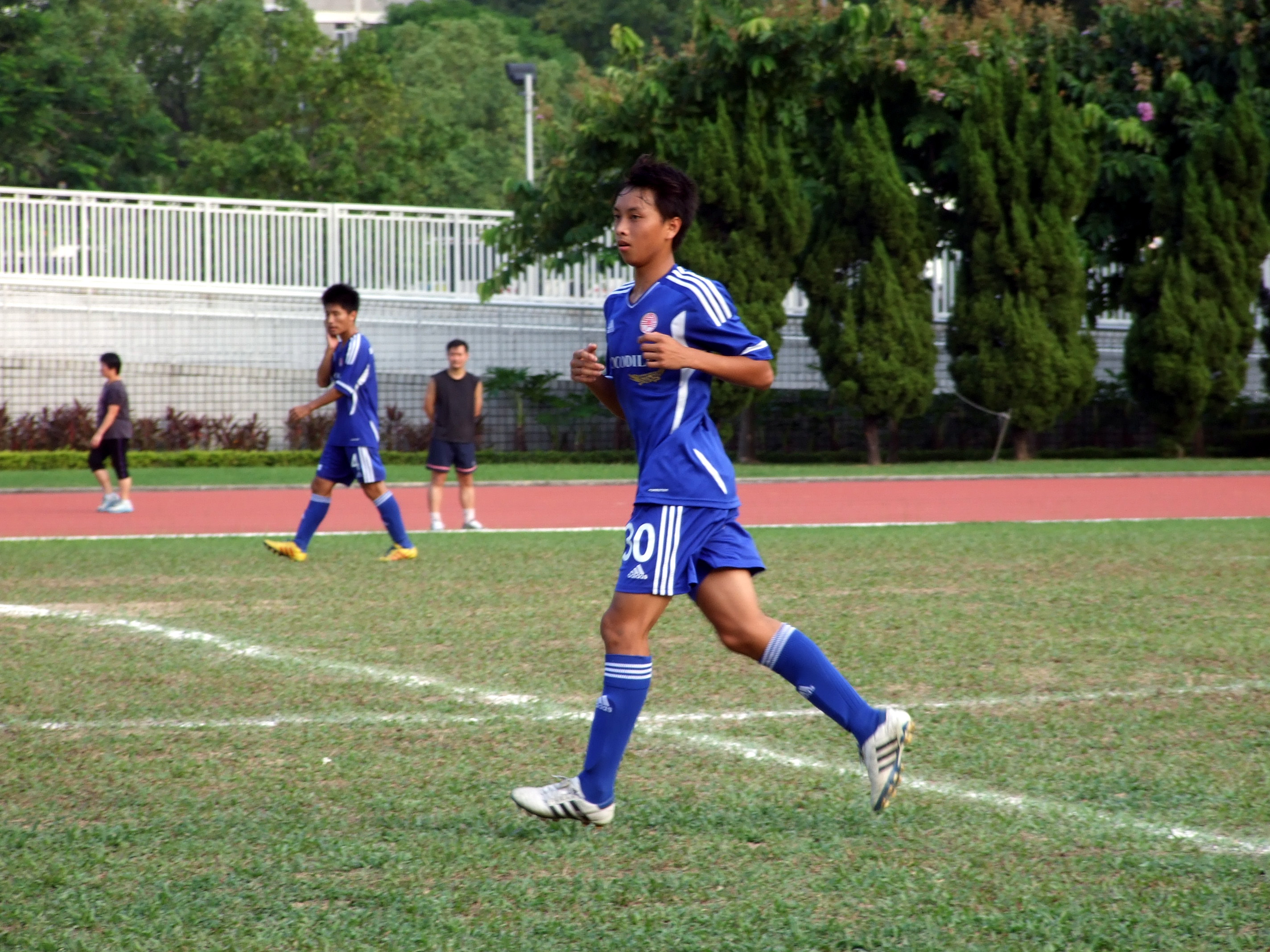

Personal information
- Full name: Wong Tsz Ho
- Date of birth: 7 March 1994 (age 32)
- Place of birth: Hong Kong
- Height: 1.77 m (5 ft 10 in)
- Position: Left back

Team information
- Current team: North District
- Number: 37

Youth career
- South China

Senior career*
Years	Team	Apps	(Gls)
2010–2026	Eastern	132	(4)
2014–2015	→ Wong Tai Sin (loan)	11	(0)
2015–2016	→ Metro Gallery (loan)	13	(3)
2016	→ Rangers (HKG) (loan)	9	(0)
2026–	North District	8	(0)

International career^{‡}
2015	Hong Kong U-23	1	(0)
2016–2023	Hong Kong	13	(0)
- * Club domestic league appearances and goals as of 20 November 2026 ‡ National team caps and goals as of 17 October 2023

Wong Tsz Ho (Chinese: 黃梓浩; born 7 March 1994) is a Hong Kong professional footballer who currently plays as a left back for Hong Kong Premier League club North District.

== Club career ==
=== Eastern ===
On 12 September 2015, Wong scored his first Hong Kong Premier League goal in the match against Wong Tai Sin while on loan at Metro Gallery. The match ended with a score of 2–0.

On 12 June 2018, it was confirmed that Wong had signed a new three-year contract with Eastern.

On 9 May 2026, it was confirmed that Wong would leave the club after 16 years.

=== North District ===
On 17 July 2026, Wong joined North District.

== International career ==
On 6 June 2016, Wong made his international debut for Hong Kong in a 2016 AYA Bank Cup match against Myanmar.

== Career statistics ==
=== International ===
As of 17 October 2023

National team	Year	Apps	Goals
Hong Kong	2016	1	0
Hong Kong	2017	2	0
Hong Kong	2018	0	0
Hong Kong	2019	0	0
Hong Kong	2020	0	0
Hong Kong	2021	0	0
Hong Kong	2022	5	0
Hong Kong	2023	5	0
Total		13	0

#	Date	Venue	Opponent	Result	Competition
2016
1	6 June 2016	Thuwunna Stadium, Yangon, Myanmar	Myanmar	0–3	2016 AYA Bank Cup
2017
2	23 March 2017	King Abdullah II Stadium, Amman, Jordan	Jordan	0–4	Friendly
3	31 August 2017	Jalan Besar Stadium, Kallang, Singapore	Singapore	1–1	Friendly
2022
4	1 June 2022	Bukit Jalil Stadium, Kuala Lumpur, Malaysia	Malaysia	0–2	Friendly
5	8 June 2022	Salt Lake Stadium, Kolkata, India	Afghanistan	2–1	2023 AFC Asian Cup qualification
6	11 June 2022	Salt Lake Stadium, Kolkata, India	Cambodia	3–0	2023 AFC Asian Cup qualification
7	14 June 2022	Salt Lake Stadium, Kolkata, India	India	0–4	2023 AFC Asian Cup qualification
8	21 September 2022	Mong Kok Stadium, Mong Kok, Hong Kong	Myanmar	2–0	Friendly
2023
9	23 March 2023	Mong Kok Stadium, Mong Kok, Hong Kong	Singapore	1–1	Friendly
10	28 March 2023	Sultan Ibrahim Stadium, Johor, Malaysia	Malaysia	0–2	Friendly
11	15 June 2023	Lạch Tray Stadium, Hai Phong, Vietnam	Vietnam	0–1	Friendly
12	19 June 2023	Hong Kong Stadium, So Kon Po, Hong Kong	Thailand	0–1	Friendly
13	17 October 2023	Changlimithang Stadium, Thimphu, Bhutan	Bhutan	0–2	2026 FIFA World Cup qualification – AFC first round

== Honours ==
=== Club ===
Eastern

- Hong Kong FA Cup: 2019–20, 2023–24, 2024–25
- Hong Kong Senior Shield: 2019–20, 2024–25

=== Individual ===
- Best Youth Player: 2016–17
