= Leung Tsz Chun =

Hong Kong footballer (born 1985)

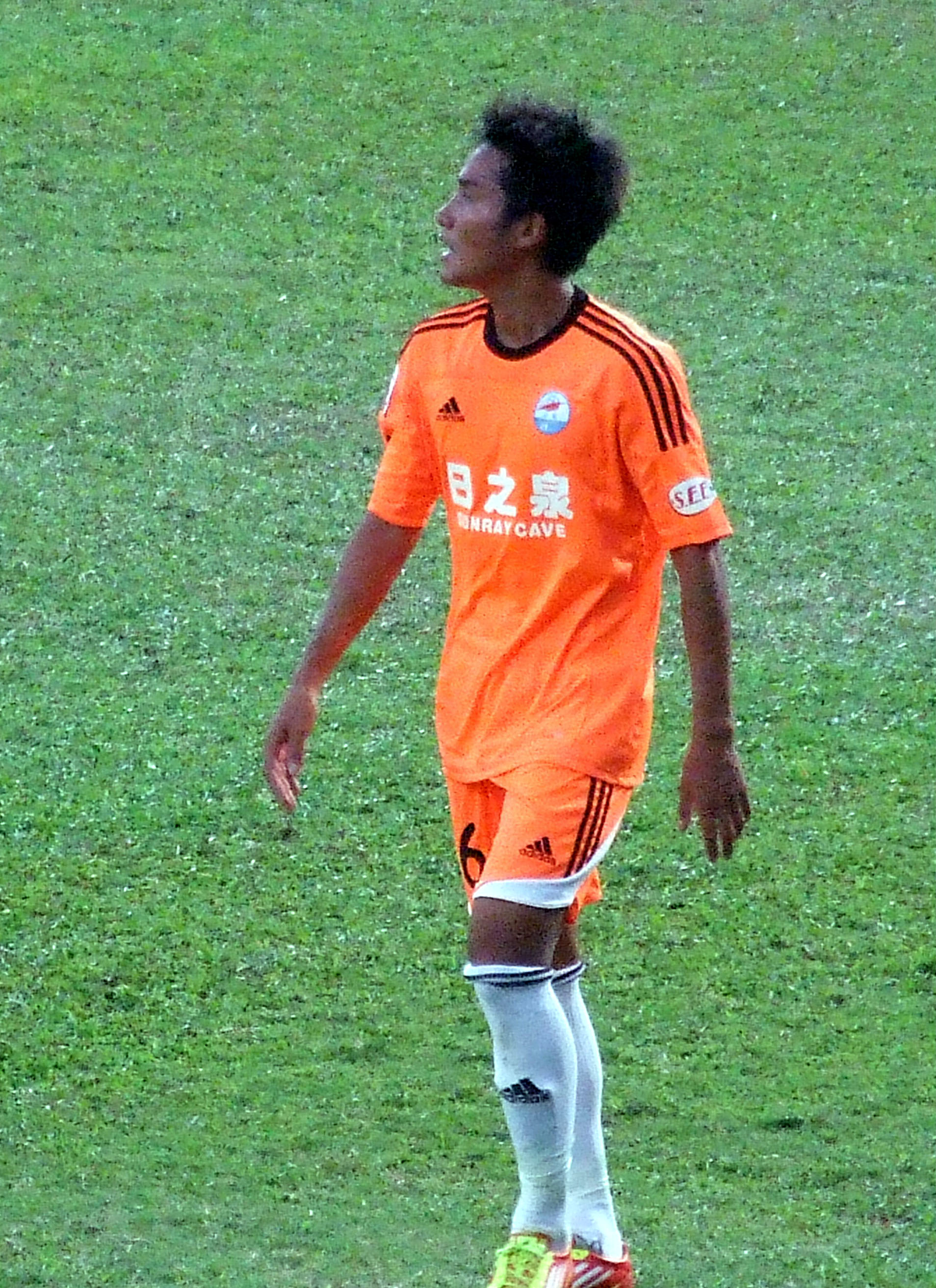

Personal information
- Full name: Leung Tsz Chun
- Date of birth: 19 May 1985 (age 41)
- Place of birth: Hong Kong
- Height: 1.73 m (5 ft 8 in)
- Positions: Striker; right winger

Senior career*
Years	Team	Apps	(Gls)
2003–2006	South China	32	(21)
2006–2007	Hong Kong Rangers	18	(14)
2007–2008	Happy Valley	6	(8)
2007–2008	→ Eastern (loan)	8	(8)
2008–2009	Mutual	22	(7)
2009–2011	Pegasus	28	(3)
2011–2013	Sun Hei	35	(6)
2013–2015	Eastern	29	(0)
2015–2018	Southern	26	(3)
2018–2019	Dreams FC	11	(0)
2019–2020	King Fung	12	(4)
2020	Tai Po	1	(0)
2022	Central & Western	5	(1)

International career^{‡}
2007	Hong Kong U-23	6	(0)
2010–2012	Hong Kong	5	(0)
- * Club domestic league appearances and goals as of 30 October 2022 ‡ National team caps and goals as of 18 August 2012

Leung Tsz Chun (Chinese: 梁子駿; Jyutping: loeng^{4} zi^{2} zeon^{3}; born 19 May 1985 in Hong Kong) is a Hong Kong former professional footballer. He played as a striker and as a right-winger.

== Career statistics ==
=== International ===
==== Hong Kong ====
As of 18 August 2012

#	Date	Venue	Opponent	Result	Scored	Competition
1	6 January 2010	National Stadium, Madinat 'Isa, Bahrain	Bahrain	0–4	0	2011 AFC Asian Cup qualification
2	14 February 2010	Olympic Stadium, Tokyo, Japan	China	0–2	0	2010 East Asian Football Championship
3	1 June 2012	Hong Kong Stadium, Hong Kong	Singapore	1–0	0	Friendly
4	10 June 2012	Mong Kok Stadium, Hong Kong	Vietnam	1–2	0	Friendly
5	15 August 2012	Jurong West Stadium, Singapore	Singapore	0–2	0	Friendly

==== Hong Kong U-23 ====
As of 18 April 2007

#	Date	Venue	Opponents	Result	Goals	Competition
1	7 February 2007	National Stadium, Dhaka, Bangladesh	Bangladesh	3–0	0	2008 Summer Olympics qualification
2	14 February 2007	Hong Kong Stadium, Hong Kong	Bangladesh	0–1	0	2008 Summer Olympics qualification
3	28 February 2007	Olympic Stadium, Tokyo, Japan	Japan	0–3	0	2008 Summer Olympics qualification
4	14 March 2007	Hong Kong Stadium, Hong Kong	Syria	0–2	0	2008 Summer Olympics qualification
5	28 March 2007	Mong Kok Stadium, Hong Kong	Malaysia	0–1	0	2008 Summer Olympics qualification
6	18 April 2007	Kuala Lumpur, Malaysia	Malaysia	0–1	0	2008 Summer Olympics qualification

== Honours ==
Eastern

- Hong Kong Senior Shield: 2007–08
- Hong Kong FA Cup: 2013–14

Pegasus

- Hong Kong FA Cup: 2009–10

Sun Hei

- Hong Kong Senior Shield: 2011–12
