= 2014–15 Hong Kong Premier League =

Hong Kong Premier League
- Season: 2014–15
- Champions: Kitchee
- Relegated: Tai Po
- AFC Champions League: Kitchee
- AFC Cup: South China
- Matches: 72
- Goals: 240 (3.33 per match)
- Top goalscorer: (Brazil) Giovane (Eastern) (17 goals)
- Biggest home win: Eastern 7–1 Tai Po (7 December 2014)
- Biggest away win: Rangers 0–5 Kitchee (29 March 2015)
- Highest scoring: Eastern 7–1 Tai Po (7 December 2014)
- Longest winning run: 7 games Kitchee
- Longest unbeaten run: 9 games South China
- Longest winless run: 13 games Tai Po
- Longest losing run: 6 games Yuen Long
- Highest attendance: 3,523; Kitchee 2–2 South China; Mong Kok Stadium (Week 10)
- Lowest attendance: 209; Rangers 2–0 Yuen Long; Kowloon Bay Park (Week 11)
- Total attendance: 75,431
- Average attendance: 1,048

2014–15 Hong Kong Premier League (also known as BOCG Life Hong Kong Premier League for sponsorship reasons) was the inaugural season of Hong Kong Premier League, the top division of Hong Kong football. The fixtures were announced on 15 August 2014. The season began on 12 September 2014 and concluded on 9 May 2015.

== Teams ==
A total of 9 teams will contest the league, including seven sides from the 2013–14 Hong Kong First Division League and two promoted from the 2013–14 Hong Kong Second Division.

=== Stadia and locations ===
Note: Table lists in alphabetical order.

Team	Stadium	Location	Capacity
Rangers	Kowloon Bay Park	Kowloon Bay	1,200
Eastern	Tseung Kwan O Sports Ground	Tseung Kwan O	3,500
Yuen Long	Yuen Long Stadium	Yuen Long	4,932
Kitchee	Mong Kok Stadium	Mong Kok	6,664
South China	Hong Kong Stadium	So Kon Po	40,000
Pegasus	Mong Kok Stadium	Mong Kok	6,664
Tai Po	Tai Po Sports Ground	Tai Po	3,000
Wong Tai Sin	Hammer Hill Road Sports Ground	Choi Hung	2,200
YFCMD	Sham Shui Po Sports Ground	Cheung Sha Wan	2,194

Locations of the 2014-15 Hong Kong Premier League teams

=== Personnel and kits ===
Team	Chairman	Head coach	Captain	Kitmaker	Shirt sponsor
Rangers	Mok Yiu Keung	Yan Lik Kin	(Brazil) Beto	Xtep	Kunne
Eastern	Lam Kin Ming	Cristiano Cordeiro	Leung Chi Wing	Adidas	Dream Foundations
Yuen Long	Wong Wai Shun	Chan Ho Yin	Cheng King Ho	Nike	Wong & Poon Solicitors
Kitchee	Ken Ng	(Spain) José Molina	Lo Kwan Yee	Nike	Jockey Club Kitchee Centre
South China	Wallace Cheung	(Brazil) Ricardo	Chan Wai Ho	Adidas	Panasonic
Pegasus	Cheng Ting Kong	Chan Chi Hong	Tong Kin Man	Adidas	Yahoo
Tai Po	Cheung Hok Ming	Pau Ka Yiu	Chan Yuk Chi	Adidas	Lee Kee Group Ltd
Wong Tai Sin	Ma Hung Ming	Chiu Chung Man (Hong Kong) Poon Man Chun	(Brazil) Sandro	Nike	
YFCMD	Khan Swadiq	Lee Chi Kin	Leung Kwun Chung	Nike	LEOC

=== Chairman changes ===
Team	Outgoing Chairman	Date of vacancy	Incoming Chairman	Date of appointment
South China	(Macau) Steven Lo	30 May 2014	Wallace Cheung	1 June 2014
YFCMD	(Japan) Hiroshi Onodera	1 July 2014	Khan Swadiq	1 July 2014

=== Managerial changes ===
Team	Outgoing manager	Manner of departure	Date of vacancy	Position in table	Incoming manager	Date of appointment
Kitchee	Cheng Siu Chung; Chu Chi Kwong	Returned as assistant coach	23 May 2014	Pre-season	(Spain) José Molina	23 May 2014
Pegasus	Chan Chi Hong	Promoted as Technical Director	9 June 2014	Pre-season	(Brazil) Ricardo	9 June 2014
Rangers	(Brazil) Ricardo	Signed by Pegasus	9 June 2014	Pre-season	Chan Hung Ping	9 June 2014
Wong Tai Sin	Chan Chi Kwong	Returned as assistant coach	9 July 2014	Pre-season	Chiu Chung Man; Poon Man Chun	9 July 2014
Rangers	Chan Hung Ping	Returned as assistant coach	11 July 2014	Pre-season	Tim Bredbury	11 July 2014
Rangers	Tim Bredbury	Resigned	14 July 2014	Pre-season	Chan Hung Ping	14 July 2014
Rangers	Chan Hung Ping	Returned as assistant coach	1 August 2014	Pre-season	Cheung Po Chun	1 August 2014
South China	Yeung Ching Kwong	Sacked, Poor league position	14 December 2014	3rd	(Argentina) Mario Gómez	22 December 2014
Rangers	Cheung Po Chun	Sacked, Poor league position	10 January 2015	7th	Yan Lik Kin	10 January 2015
Pegasus	(Brazil) Ricardo	Sacked, Poor run of recent result	27 January 2015	2nd	Chan Chi Hong	27 January 2015
South China	(Argentina) Mario Gómez	Signed by Johor DT	1 May 2015	4th	(Brazil) Ricardo	1 May 2015
South China	(Brazil) Ricardo	Returned as assistant coach	14 May 2015	4th	(Brazil) Casemiro Mior	14 May 2015

=== Foreign players ===
The number of foreign players is restricted to six (including an Asian player) per team, with no more than four on pitch during matches.

Club	Player 1	Player 2	Player 3	Player 4	Player 5	Asian Player
Eastern	(Brazil) Diego Eli	(Brazil) Giovane	(Brazil) Michel Lugo	(Croatia) Miroslav Saric	(England) Rohan Ricketts	(Australia) Dylan Macallister
Kitchee	(Spain) Juan Belencoso	(Spain) Dani Cancela	(Spain) Fernando Recio	(Spain) Borja Rubiato	(Spain) Jordi Tarrés	(South Korea) Kim Tae-Min
Rangers	(Equatorial Guinea) Iván Zarandona	(Spain) Óscar	(South Korea) Han Jae-woong	(Spain) Yago González		(Japan) Hiromichi Katano
South China	(Australia) Evan Kostopoulos	(Cameroon) Mahama Awal	(Ecuador) Cristian Mora	(Japan) Yuto Nakamura	(Serbia) Bojan Mališić	(Australia) Daniel McBreen
Pegasus	(Bosnia and Herzegovina) Dario Damjanović	(Bosnia and Herzegovina) Admir Raščić	(Croatia) Niko Tokić	(Romania) Petrisor Voinea	(Serbia) Igor Miović	(Australia) Jerrad Tyson
Tai Po	(Brazil) Clayton	(Brazil) Naves	(Brazil) Joao Sales	(Netherlands) Vincent Weijl		(Macau) Leong Ka Hang
Wong Tai Sin	(Brazil) Maurício	(Brazil) Sandro	(Brazil) Tomas	(China) Zhang Jun	(Serbia) Mirko Teodorović	(South Korea) Yoon Dong-hun
YFCMD	(Brazil) Fernando Pereira	(Guinea) Mamadou Barry	(Spain) Dieguito	(Spain) Jose Maria Diaz	(Spain) Rubén López	(Japan) Kenji Fukuda
Yuen Long	(Brazil) Reinaldo	(Brazil) Gustavo Silva	(Brazil) Wellingsson Souza	(Montenegro) Čedomir Mijanović		(Japan) Tsuyoshi Yoshitake

== League table ==
Pos	Team	Pld	W	D	L	GF	GA	GD	Pts	Qualification or relegation
1	Kitchee	16	11	3	2	40	18	+22	36	Qualification to Champions League preliminary round 2
2	Eastern	16	10	3	3	34	20	+14	33	Qualification to season play-off (Note: As Kitchee won the FA Cup, Eastern finished 2nd in Premier League and won the Senior Challenge Shield, teams finishing 4th and 5th in Premier League entered the season play-off as well.)
3	Pegasus	16	8	3	5	34	23	+11	27 (Note: Pegasus wins head-to-head against South China.)	Qualification to season play-off
4	South China	16	7	6	3	30	17	+13	27	Qualification to AFC Cup group stage (Note: As winners of the season play-off.)
5	YFCMD	16	8	2	6	25	29	−4	26	Qualification to season play-off
6	Yuen Long	16	5	2	9	20	31	−11	17	
7	Rangers	16	4	2	10	20	33	−13	14 (Note: Rangers wins head-to-head against Wong Tai Sin.)	
8	Wong Tai Sin	16	3	5	8	20	29	−9	14	
9	Tai Po	16	1	4	11	17	40	−23	7	Relegation to First Division

Source: Hong Kong Football Association
Rules for classification: 1) Points; 2) Head-to-head points; 3) Head-to-head goal difference; 4) Head-to-head goals scored; 5) Goal difference; 6) Goals scored; 7) Fair-play points; 8) Drawing lots (Play-off if the winner has to be decided)

== Results ==
Home \ Away	HKR	EAA	IYL	KIT	SCA	SPS	TPO	WTS	YFC
Rangers		0–1	2–0	0–5	1–4	1–4	3–1	3–0	0–2
Eastern	2–1		2–1	0–4	1–2	3–3	7–1	1–1	1–1
Yuen Long	1–0	0–3		0–3	1–0	1–4	2–1	1–1	3–1
Kitchee	2–1	1–3	2–1		2–2	2–1	4–1	1–0	4–1
South China	0–0	3–0	5–2	2–2		0–3	0–0	4–0	2–0
Pegasus	5–1	0–3	3–2	0–1	2–4		4–1	1–0	2–2
Tai Po	1–3	0–1	0–2	3–3	1–1	0–0		2–3	0–1
Wong Tai Sin	3–3	1–2	2–2	0–2	1–1	2–0	1–3		0–2
YFCMD	2–1	1–4	2–1	3–2	1–0	0–2	5–2	1–5	

Updated to match(es) played on unknown. Source: Hong Kong Football Association
Legend: Blue = home team win; Yellow = draw; Red = away team win.

== Fixtures and results ==
=== Round 1 ===
14 September 2014	Yuen Long	1–0	Rangers	Yuen Long, New Territories
14:30 UTC+8	Yoshitake 45+1'	Report		Stadium: Yuen Long Stadium; Attendance: 1,175; Referee: Lau Fong Hei; Assistant referees: Chan Siu Hung, Yu Chun Sun; Fourth official: Chan Ming Siu

28 October 2014	South China	0–3	Pegasus	So Kon Po, Hong Kong Island
20:00 UTC+8		Report	Tong Kin Man 4'; Ju Yingzhi 39'; Raščić 71'	Stadium: Hong Kong Stadium; Attendance: 1,975; Referee: Ng Chiu Kok; Assistant referees: Ching Oi Cho, Lam Nai Kei; Fourth official: Ho Wai Sing

18 January 2015	YFCMD	5–2	Tai Po	Cheung Sha Wan, Kowloon
14:30 UTC+8	Rubén 11'; Fukuda 21' (pen.), 38', 41'; Hui Ka Lok 31'	Report	Ye Jia 17'; Weijl 89' (pen.)	Stadium: Sham Shui Po Sports Ground; Attendance: 609; Referee: Ho Wai Sing; Assistant referees: Chan Shui Hung, Ng Wai Hong; Fourth official: Law Bik Chi

28 February 2015	Eastern	0–4	Kitchee	Tseung Kwan O, New Territories
UTC+8 20:00		Report	Belencoso 25', 55' (pen.); Xu Deshuai 87'; Jordi 90+2'	Stadium: Tseung Kwan O Sports Ground; Attendance: 1,639; Referee: Ng Chiu Kok; Assistant referees: Chow Chun Kit, Fok Pong Shing; Fourth official: Lau Fong Hei

=== Round 2 ===
21 September 2014	Rangers	3–1	Tai Po	Cheung Sha Wan, Kowloon
14:30 UTC+8	James Ha 4'; Yago 61'; Wong Yiu Fu 90+5'		Choi Kwok Wai 38'	Stadium: Sham Shui Po Sports Ground; Attendance: 642; Referee: Luk Kin Sun; Assistant referees: Lam Nai Kei, Sarao; Fourth official: Ho Wai Sing

21 September 2014	Pegasus	1–0	Wong Tai Sin	Mong Kok, Kowloon
17:00 UTC+8	Raščić 69'			Stadium: Mong Kok Stadium; Attendance: 1,569; Referee: Ng Chiu Kok; Assistant referees: Lam Chi Ho, Fok Pong Shing; Fourth official: Tang Hing Fu

26 November 2014	Eastern	1–2	South China	Mong Kok, Kowloon
20:00 UTC+8	Lo Chi Kwan 83'	Report	Nakamura 76'; Chan Siu Ki 84'	Stadium: Mong Kok Stadium; Attendance: 1,811; Referee: Liu Kwok Man; Assistant referees: Lam Chi Ho, Yu Chun Sun; Fourth official: Luk Kin Sun

28 January 2015	Kitchee	4–1	YFCMD	Mong Kok, Kowloon
20:00 UTC+8	Xu Deshuai 11', 30'; Belencoso 22' (pen.); Paulinho 65'	Report	Hady Barry 90+1'	Stadium: Mong Kok Stadium; Attendance: 518; Referee: Lau Fong Hei; Assistant referees: Chung Ming Sang, Mok Ka Ming; Fourth official: Tong Kui Sum

=== Round 3 ===
28 September 2014	Tai Po	1–1	South China	Tai Po, New Territories
14:30 UTC+8	Gibbs 70'	Report	Makriev 45+1'	Stadium: Tai Po Sports Ground; Attendance: 1,449; Referee: Ng Chiu Kok; Assistant referees: Chow Chun Kit, Lee Chung Yin; Fourth official: Ng Wai Hong

28 September 2014	Yuen Long	1–4	Pegasus	Yuen Long, New Territories
17:30 UTC+8	Souza 90+2'	Report	Sham Kwok Keung 20'; Raščić 37' 78'; Voinea 88'	Stadium: Yuen Long Stadium; Attendance: 1,322; Referee: Liu Kwok Man; Assistant referees: Lam Chi Ho, Yu Kin Fung; Fourth official: Lau Fong Hei

6 February 2015	Kitchee	1–0	Wong Tai Sin	Mong Kok, Kowloon
20:00 UTC+8	Xu Deshuai 15'	Report		Stadium: Mong Kok Stadium; Attendance: 634; Referee: Chan Ming Siu; Assistant referees: Ching Oi Cho, Lee Chung Yin; Fourth official: Ng Wai Hong

22 March 2015	YFCMD	2–1	Rangers	Cheung Sha Wan, Kowloon
14:30 UTC+8	Fukuda 30'; Tan Chun Lok 77'	Report	Beto 55'	Stadium: Sham Shui Po Sports Ground; Attendance: 447; Referee: Tang Hing Fu; Assistant referees: Ching Oi Cho, Lee Chung Yin; Fourth official: Ng Chiu Kok

=== Round 4 ===
2 October 2014	Wong Tai Sin	1–2	Eastern	Choi Hung, Kowloon
14:30 UTC+8	Maurício 87'		Michael Luk 35'; Giovane 50'	Stadium: Hammer Hill Road Sports Ground; Attendance: 1,448; Referee: Lau Fong Hei; Assistant referees: Chow Chun Kit, Sarao; Fourth official: Law Bik Chi

4 October 2014	Rangers	1–4	South China	Cheung Sha Wan, Kowloon
14:30 UTC+8	Chan Wai Ho 32' (o.g.)	Report	Itaparica 15', 36', 59'; Chan Wai Ho 68'	Stadium: Sham Shui Po Sports Ground; Attendance: 1,035; Referee: Chan Ming Siu; Assistant referees: Lam Nai Kei, Law Ming Leong; Fourth official: Lau Fong Hei

4 October 2014	Yuen Long	2–1	Tai Po	Yuen Long, New Territories
17:30 UTC+8	Fábio 45+1'; Yoshitake 90+4'	Report	Li Ka Chun 38'	Stadium: Yuen Long Stadium; Attendance: 871; Referee: Ho Wai Sing; Assistant referees: Yu Chun Sun, Yau Ho Fai; Fourth official: Tang Hing Fu

5 October 2014	YFCMD	0–2	Pegasus	Cheung Sha Wan, Kowloon
14:30 UTC+8		Report	Raščić 10'; Ju Yingzhi 77'	Stadium: Sham Shui Po Sports Ground; Attendance: 1,003; Referee: Luk Kin Sun; Assistant referees: Tang Hing Fu, Fok Pong Shing; Fourth official: Mok Ka Ming

=== Round 5 ===
18 October 2014	Pegasus	5–1	Rangers	Mong Kok, Kowloon
14:30 UTC+8	Chan Man Fai 9', 61'; Sham Kwok Keung 29'; Raščić 52'; Chan Pak Hang 69'	Report	Cheng Siu Kwan 67'	Stadium: Mong Kok Stadium; Attendance: 1,008; Referee: Ho Wai Sing; Assistant referees: Lam Chi Ho, Ching Oi Cho; Fourth official: Lau Fong Hei

18 October 2014	Eastern	1–1	YFCMD	Tseung Kwan O, New Territories
17:30 UTC+8	Giovane 49'	Report	Fukuda 5'	Stadium: Tseung Kwan O Sports Ground; Attendance: 657; Referee: Liu Kwok Man; Assistant referees: Chow Chun Kit, Yau Ho Fai; Fourth official: Tang Hing Fu

19 October 2014	Tai Po	2–3	Wong Tai Sin	Tai Po, New Territories
14:30 UTC+8	Chen Jingde 3'; Weijl 73'	Report	Mauricio 49'; Wong Chun Hin 59'; Lai Yiu Cheong 76'	Stadium: Tai Po Sports Ground; Attendance: 861; Referee: Chan Ming Siu; Assistant referees: Chan Siu Hung, Gang Kin Fung; Fourth official: Law Bik Chi

19 October 2014	Kitchee	2–1	Yuen Long	Mong Kok, Kowloon
17:30 UTC+8	Jordi 34'; Xu Deshuai 79'	Report	Cheng King Ho 17'	Stadium: Mong Kok Stadium; Attendance: 926; Referee: Ng Chiu Kok; Assistant referees: Lam Nai Kei, Yu Chun Sun; Fourth official: Luk Kin Sun

=== Round 6 ===
31 October 2014	Kitchee	2–1	Rangers	Mong Kok, Kowloon
20:00 UTC+8	Jordi 69'; Belencoso 87'	Report	James Ha 86'	Stadium: Mong Kok Stadium; Attendance: 638; Referee: Liu Kwok Man; Assistant referees: Tang Hing Fu, Yau Ho Fai; Fourth official: Law Bik Chi

1 November 2014	Pegasus	0–3	Eastern	Mong Kok, Kowloon
17:30 UTC+8		Report	Giovane 33', 37' (pen.); Kilama 52'	Stadium: Mong Kok Stadium; Attendance: 1,860; Referee: Ching Oi Cho; Assistant referees: Chow Chun Kit, Sarao; Fourth official: Lau Fong Hei

2 November 2014	Wong Tai Sin	2–2	Yuen Long	Choi Hung, Kowloon
14:30 UTC+8	Sandro 72'; Mauricio 90+6'	Report	Yoshitake 1'; Yuan Yang 44'	Stadium: Hammer Hill Road Sports Ground; Attendance: 527; Referee: Ho Wai Sing; Assistant referees: Yu Chun Sun, Gang Kin Fung; Fourth official: Luk Kin Sun

2 November 2014	South China	2–0	YFCMD	So Kon Po, Hong Kong Island
17:30 UTC+8	Sean Tse 20', 40'	Report		Stadium: Hong Kong Stadium; Attendance: 1,095; Referee: Tang Hing Fu; Assistant referees: Chan Siu Hung, Fok Pong Shing; Fourth official: Ng Chiu Kok

=== Round 7 ===
22 November 2014	Tai Po	0–0	Pegasus	Tai Po, New Territories
14:30 UTC+8		Report		Stadium: Tai Po Sports Ground; Attendance: 809; Referee: Luk Kin Sun; Assistant referees: Chow Chun Kit, Yau Tsz Yeung; Fourth official: Law Ming Leung

22 November 2014	Yuen Long	0–3	Eastern	Yuen Long, New Territories
17:30 UTC+8		Report	Lugo 8'; Macallister 65'; Giovane 90'	Stadium: Yuen Long Stadium; Attendance: 1,364; Referee: Ng Chiu Kok; Assistant referees: Chan Siu Hung, Yu Chun Sun; Fourth official: Chan Ming Siu

23 November 2014	South China	2–2	Kitchee	So Kon Po, Hong Kong Island
14:30 UTC+8	Leung Chun Pong 12'; Chan Wai Ho 51'	Report	Belencoso 71'; Lam Ka Wai 87'	Stadium: Hong Kong Stadium; Attendance: 2,289; Referee: Ho Wai Sing; Assistant referees: Ching Oi Cho, Sarao; Fourth official: Ng Wai Hong

23 November 2014	Rangers	3–0	Wong Tai Sin	Kowloon Bay, Kowloon
17:30 UTC+8	Chan Ming Kong 55'; Yago 59'; Cheng Siu Kwan 90+1'	Report		Stadium: Kowloon Bay Park; Attendance: 277; Referee: Tang Hing Fu; Assistant referees: Lam Chi Ho, Chung Ming Sang; Fourth official: Lau Fong Hei

=== Round 8 ===
6 December 2014	Wong Tai Sin	1–1	South China	Choi Hung, Kowloon
14:30 UTC+8	Li Jian 34'	Report	Evan 56'	Stadium: Hammer Hill Road Sports Ground; Attendance: 840; Referee: Ho Wai Sing; Assistant referees: Lam Nai Kei, Sarao; Fourth official: Chan Ming Siu

6 December 2014	Pegasus	0–1	Kitchee	Mong Kok, Kowloon
17:30 UTC+8		Report	Belencoso 17'	Stadium: Mong Kok Stadium; Attendance: 1,836; Referee: Liu Kwok Man; Assistant referees: Tang Hing Fu, Fok Pong Shing; Fourth official: Gang Kin Fung

7 December 2014	YFCMD	2–1	Yuen Long	Cheung Sha Wan, Kowloon
14:30 UTC+8	Fernando 38'; Dieguito 82'	Report	Yuen Lap Cheung 86'	Stadium: Sham Shui Po Sports Ground; Attendance: 560; Referee: Luk Kin Sun; Assistant referees: Ching Oi Cho, Yau Ho Fai; Fourth official: Lo Yuk Ming

7 December 2014	Eastern	7–1	Tai Po	Tseung Kwan O, New Territories
17:30 UTC+8	Giovane 5', 41'; Kilama 18'; Yiu Hok Man 77', 90', 90+3'; Saric 88'	Report	Weijl 10'	Stadium: Tseung Kwan O Sports Ground; Attendance: 522; Referee: Lau Fong Hei; Assistant referees: Lam Chi Ho, Chan Shing Kin; Fourth official: Wong Bing Chung

=== Round 9 ===
12 September 2014	Kitchee	4–1	Tai Po	Mong Kok, Hong Kong
20:00 UTC+8	Jordi 11'; Lam Ka Wai 58', 67'; Recio 86'	Report	Chen Jingde 87'	Stadium: Mong Kok Stadium; Attendance: 1,472; Referee: Ho Wai Sing; Assistant referees: Ching Oi Cho, Chow Chun Kit; Fourth official: Law Bik Chi

9 November 2014	Wong Tai Sin	0–2	YFCMD	Choi Hung, Kowloon
14:30 UTC+8		Report	Lee Ka Yiu 7'; Díaz 42'	Stadium: Hammer Hill Road Sports Ground; Attendance: 485; Referee: Luk Kin Sun; Assistant referees: Lam Chi Ho, Ng Wai Hong; Fourth official: Law Ming Leung

13 December 2014	South China	5–2	Yuen Long	So Kon Po, Hong Kong Island
14:30 UTC+8	Nakamura 36', 43'; Evan 50'; Lo Kong Wai 62'; Chan Siu Ki 81'	Report	Yu Ho Pong 76'; Gustavo 90+3'	Stadium: Hong Kong Stadium; Attendance: 1,016; Referee: Chan Ming Siu; Assistant referees: Chow Chun Kit, Yau Tsz Yeung; Fourth official: Law Bik Chi

14 December 2014	Rangers	0–1	Eastern	Kowloon Bay, Kowloon
17:30 UTC+8		Report	Giovane 75'	Stadium: Kowloon Bay Park; Attendance: 457; Referee: Ho Wai Sing; Assistant referees: Chung Ming Sang, Wong Bing Chung; Fourth official: Tang Hing Fu

=== Round 10 ===
10 January 2015	Wong Tai Sin	3–3	Rangers	Choi Hung, Kowloon
14:30 UTC+8	Li Jian 45'; Yoon Dong-Heon 64'; Sandro 90+6'	Report	Wong Tsz Ho 20' (o.g.); Yago 36'; Óscar 72'	Stadium: Hammer Hill Road Sports Ground; Attendance: 345; Referee: Liu Kwok Man; Assistant referees: Chan Siu Hung, Law Bik Chi; Fourth official: Chan Shing Kin

10 January 2015	Pegasus	4–1	Tai Po	Mong Kok, Kowloon
17:30 UTC+8	Landon Ling 30'; Festus 44'; Damjanović 48'; Raščić 53'	Report	Weijl 25'	Stadium: Mong Kok Stadium; Attendance: 965; Referee: Chan Ming Siu; Assistant referees: Lam Chi Ho, Wong Bing Chung; Fourth official: Ho Wai Sing

11 January 2015	Eastern	2–1	Yuen Long	Tseung Kwan O, New Territories
14:30 UTC+8	Giovane 78', 79'	Report	Cheung Chi Yung 20'	Stadium: Tseung Kwan O Sports Ground; Attendance: 607; Referee: Lau Fong Hei; Assistant referees: Yu Chun Sun, Mok Ka Ming; Fourth official: Liu Kwok Man

11 January 2015	Kitchee	2–2	South China	Mong Kok, Kowloon
17:30 UTC+8	Belencoso 52', 58'	Report	Russell 24'; Awal 90+4'	Stadium: Mong Kok Stadium; Attendance: 3,523; Referee: Ng Chiu Kok; Assistant referees: Lam Nai Kei, Chung Ming Sang; Fourth official: Tong Kui Sum

=== Round 11 ===
24 January 2015	Tai Po	0–1	YFCMD	Tai Po, New Territories
14:30 UTC+8		Report	Fernando 90+5' (pen.)	Stadium: Tai Po Sports Ground; Attendance: 637; Referee: Ching Oi Cho; Assistant referees: Lam Nai Kei, Yu Chun Sun; Fourth official: Tang Hing Fu

24 January 2015	Kitchee	1–3	Eastern	Mong Kok, Kowloon
17:30 UTC+8	Paulinho 45+2'	Report	Šarić 32'; Liang Zicheng 71'; Macallister 79'	Stadium: Mong Kok Stadium; Attendance: 2,416; Referee: Tong Kui Sum; Assistant referees: Chan Siu Hung, Yau Ho Fai; Fourth official: Ho Wai Sing

25 January 2015	Pegasus	2–4	South China	Mong Kok, Kowloon
14:30 UTC+8	Yip Tsz Chun 10'; Voinea 90'	Report	Nakamura 9', 44'; Chan Siu Kwan 42'; Chan Siu Ki 67'	Stadium: Mong Kok Stadium; Attendance: 3,499; Referee: Ng Chiu Kok; Assistant referees: Chung Ming Sang, Gang Kin Fung; Fourth official: Chan Ming Siu

25 January 2015	Rangers	2–0	Yuen Long	Kowloon Bay, Kowloon
17:30 UTC+8	Yago 48'; Chuck Yiu Kwok 55'	Report		Stadium: Kowloon Bay Park; Attendance: 209; Referee: Luk Kin Sun; Assistant referees: Lam Chi Ho, Chan Shing Kin; Fourth official: Leung Chung Yin

=== Round 12 ===
7 February 2015	South China	0–0	Tai Po	So Kon Po, Hong Kong Island
14:30 UTC+8		Report		Stadium: Hong Kong Stadium; Attendance: 1,059; Referee: Tang Hing Fu; Assistant referees: Chow Chun Kit, Sarao; Fourth official: Chan Shing Kin

7 February 2015	Rangers	0–2	YFCMD	Kowloon Bay, Kowloon
17:30 UTC+8		Report	Fukuda 67'; Fernando 74'	Stadium: Kowloon Bay Park; Attendance: 261; Referee: Ng Chiu Kok; Assistant referees: Chan Siu Hung, Yu Chun Sun; Fourth official: Law Bik Chi

8 February 2015	Pegasus	3–2	Yuen Long	Mong Kok, Kowloon
17:30 UTC+8	Reinaldo 6' (o.g.); Raščić 33' (pen.); Festus 90+4'	Report	Yoshitake 25' (pen.), 45' (pen.)	Stadium: Mong Kok Stadium; Attendance: 931; Referee: Lau Fong Hei; Assistant referees: Lam Nai Kei, Chung Ming Sang; Fourth official: Chan Ming Siu

7 April 2015	Wong Tai Sin	0–2	Kitchee	Choi Hung, Kowloon
14:30 UTC+8		Report	Lam Ka Wai 51'; Xu Deshuai 65'	Stadium: Hammer Hill Road Sports Ground; Attendance: 941; Referee: Tong Kui Sum; Assistant referees: Chung Ming Sang, Chan Shing Kin; Fourth official: Tang Hing Fu

=== Round 13 ===
7 March 2015	Tai Po	0–1	Eastern	Tai Po, New Territories
14:30 UTC+8		Report	Giovane 3'	Stadium: Tai Po Sports Ground; Attendance: 736; Referee: Lau Fong Hei; Assistant referees: Chan Siu Hung, Sarao; Fourth official: Law Bik Chi

7 March 2015	Kitchee	2–1	Pegasus	Mong Kok, Kowloon
17:30 UTC+8	Jordi 16' (pen.); Matt Lam 56'	Report	Raščić 60'	Stadium: Mong Kok Stadium; Attendance: 1,849; Referee: Tong Kui Sum; Assistant referees: Chow Chun Kit, Lam Nai Kei; Fourth official: Luk Kin Sun

8 March 2015	Yuen Long	3–1	YFCMD	Yuen Long, New Territories
14:30 UTC+8	Reinaldo 54'; Yuen Lap Cheung 66'; Souza 69'	Report	Hui Ka Lok 61'	Stadium: Yuen Long Stadium; Attendance: 735; Referee: Ching Oi Cho; Assistant referees: Tang Hing Fu, Chan Shing Kin; Fourth official: Ng Wai Hong

8 March 2015	South China	4–0	Wong Tai Sin	Mong Kok, Kowloon
17:30 UTC+8	Chan Siu Ki 34' (pen.); Evan 55', 89'; Su Yang 70' (o.g.)	Report		Stadium: Mong Kok Stadium; Attendance: 1,140; Referee: Ng Chiu Kok; Assistant referees: Lam Chi Ho, Fok Pong Shing; Fourth official: Leung Chung Yin

=== Round 14 ===
14 March 2015	Yuen Long	1–1	Wong Tai Sin	Yuen Long, New Territories
14:30 UTC+8	Yuan Yang 70'	Report	Li Jian 65'	Stadium: Yuen Long Stadium; Attendance: 800; Referee: Lau Fong Hei; Assistant referees: Chan Siu Hung, Yu Chun Sun; Fourth official: Tong Kui Sum

15 March 2015	YFCMD	1–0	South China	Cheung Sha Wan, Kowloon
14:30 UTC+8	Fukuda 29'	Report		Stadium: Sham Shui Po Sports Ground; Attendance: 1,075; Referee: Luk Kin Sun; Assistant referees: Chow Chun Kit, Lam Nai Kei; Fourth official: Tong Kui Sum

15 March 2015	Eastern	3–3	Pegasus	Tseung Kwan O, New Territories
20:00 UTC+8	Šarić 35', 87'; Giovane 81' (pen.)	Report	Raščić 3'; Voinea 17'; McKee 68'	Stadium: Tseung Kwan O Sports Ground; Attendance: 981; Referee: Ng Chiu Kok; Assistant referees: Chung Ming Sang, Gang Kin Fung; Fourth official: Tang Hing Fu

29 March 2015	Rangers	0–5	Kitchee	Kowloon Bay, Kowloon
15:00 UTC+8		Report	Jordi 23'; Matt Lam 41'; Xu Deshuai 64', 90'; Annan 83'	Stadium: Kowloon Bay Park; Attendance: 582; Referee: Ng Chiu Kok; Assistant referees: Chow Chun Kit, Chung Ming Sang; Fourth official: Ho Wai Sing

=== Round 15 ===
3 April 2015	Eastern	1–1	Wong Tai Sin	Tseung Kwan O, New Territories
14:30 UTC+8	Giovane 26'	Report	Li Jian 55'	Stadium: Tseung Kwan O Sports Ground; Attendance: 783; Referee: Liu Kwok Man; Assistant referees: Yu Chun Sun, Lam Chi Ho; Fourth official: Leung Chung Yin

4 April 2015	Pegasus	2–2	YFCMD	Mong Kok, Kowloon
14:30 UTC+8	Raščić 77'; Festus 88'	Report	Fernando 9'; Fukuda 30'	Stadium: Mong Kok Stadium; Attendance: 1,268; Referee: Ho Wai Sing; Assistant referees: Chow Chun Kit, Fok Pong Shing; Fourth official: Luk Kin Sun

5 April 2015	Tai Po	0–2	Yuen Long	Tai Po, New Territories
14:30 UTC+8		Report	Reinaldo 39'; Souza 80'	Stadium: Tai Po Sports Ground; Attendance: 701; Referee: Tong Kui Sum; Assistant referees: Chan Siu Hung, Lam Nai Kei; Fourth official: Wong Bing Chung

5 April 2015	South China	0–0	Rangers	Mong Kok, Kowloon
17:30 UTC+8		Report		Stadium: Mong Kok Stadium; Attendance: 1,122; Referee: Ching Oi Cho; Assistant referees: Gang Kin Fung, Mok Ka Ming; Fourth official: Chan Ming Siu

=== Round 16 ===
18 April 2015	Wong Tai Sin	1–3	Tai Po	Choi Hung, Kowloon
14:30 UTC+8	Su Yang 77'	Report	Chen Jingde 12'; Ye Jia 55'; Sales 58'	Stadium: Hammer Hill Road Sports Ground; Attendance: 596; Referee: Luk Kin Sun; Assistant referees: Chow Chun Kit, Gang Kin Fung; Fourth official: Ng Chiu Kok

18 April 2015	Rangers	1–4	Pegasus	Kowloon Bay, Kowloon
17:30 UTC+8	Yago 76'	Report	Tokić 50', 75'; Festus 57'; Raščić 71' (pen.)	Stadium: Kowloon Bay Park; Attendance: 416; Referee: Chan Ming Siu; Assistant referees: Chan Siu Hung, Wong Bing Chung; Fourth official: Ng Wai Hong

19 April 2015	YFCMD	1–4	Eastern	Cheung Sha Wan, Kowloon
14:30 UTC+8	Fukuda 90+1' (pen.)	Report	Giovane 27', 31', 75', 90+4'	Stadium: Sham Shui Po Sports Ground; Attendance: 974; Referee: Ho Wai Sing; Assistant referees: Lam Nai Kei, Chung Ming Sang; Fourth official: Tang Hing Fu

19 April 2015	Yuen Long	0–3	Kitchee	Yuen Long, New Territories
17:30 UTC+8		Report	Jordi 3'; Belencoso 70', 90+2'	Stadium: Yuen Long Stadium; Attendance: 1,340; Referee: Ng Chiu Kok; Assistant referees: Yu Chun Sun, Lo Yuk Ming; Fourth official: Luk Kin Sun

=== Round 17 ===
1 May 2015	Eastern	2–1	Rangers	Tseung Kwan O, New Territories
14:30 UTC+8	Cheng Siu Wai 38', 54'	Report	Lai Hau Hei 85'	Stadium: Tseung Kwan O Sports Ground; Attendance: 677; Referee: Luk Kin Sun; Assistant referees: Chow Chun Kit, Yu Chun Sun; Fourth official: Tang Hing Fu

2 May 2015	Tai Po	3–3	Kitchee	Tai Po, New Territories
14:30 UTC+8	Weijl 73', 88', 90+5'	Report	Belencoso 15', 86'; Paulinho 43'	Stadium: Tai Po Sports Ground; Attendance: 1,063; Referee: Ho Wai Sing; Assistant referees: Yau Ho Fai, Sarao; Fourth official: Tang Hing Fu

2 May 2015	Yuen Long	1–0	South China	Yuen Long, New Territories
17:30 UTC+8	Mijanović 52'	Report		Stadium: Yuen Long Stadium; Attendance: 1,911; Referee: Lau Fong Hei; Assistant referees: Lam Nai Kei, Gang Kin Fung; Fourth official: Ng Chiu Kok

3 May 2015	YFCMD	1–5	Wong Tai Sin	Cheung Sha Wan, Kowloon
14:30 UTC+8	Fukuda 44'	Report	Sandro 25' (pen.), 29'; Wong Chun Hin 31'; Yeung Chi Lun 80'; Liu Pui Fung 90+3'	Stadium: Sham Shui Po Sports Ground; Attendance: 802; Referee: Ching Oi Cho; Assistant referees: Lam Chi Ho, Fok Pong Shing; Fourth official: Chan Ming Siu

=== Round 18 ===
9 May 2015	Wong Tai Sin	2–0	Pegasus	Choi Hung, Kowloon
14:30 UTC+8	Fu Shu Sing 14'; Liu Pui Fung 75'	Report		Stadium: Hammer Hill Road Sports Ground; Attendance: 370; Referee: Liu Kwok Man; Assistant referees: Sarao, Leung Chung Yin; Fourth official: Chan Ming Siu

9 May 2015	South China	3–0	Eastern	Mong Kok, Kowloon
14:30 UTC+8	Itaparica 14'; Russell 18'; Detinho 45+1'	Report		Stadium: Mong Kok Stadium; Attendance: 1,486; Referee: Ho Wai Sing; Assistant referees: Ching Oi Cho, Wong Yin Wai; Fourth official: Wong Bing Chung

9 May 2015	YFCMD	3–2	Kitchee	Cheung Sha Wan, Kowloon
14:30 UTC+8	Tan Chun Lok 26'; Fong Pak Lun 64'; Fernando 90' (pen.)	Report	Belencoso 24'; Lo Kwan Yee 56'	Stadium: Sham Shui Po Sports Ground; Attendance: 606; Referee: Tong Kui Sum; Assistant referees: Yau Ho Fai, Law Bik Chi; Fourth official: Lau Fong Hei

9 May 2015	Tai Po	1–3	Rangers	Tai Po, New Territories
14:30 UTC+8	Weijl 2'	Report	Yago 29', 53'; Han Jae-woong 31'	Stadium: Tai Po Sports Ground; Attendance: 379; Referee: Ng Chiu Kok; Assistant referees: Ng Wai Hong, Law Ming Leung; Fourth official: Luk Kin Sun

== Attendances ==
Pos	Team	Total	High	Low	Average	Change
1	Pegasus	12,936	3,499	931	1,617	+5.6%
2	Kitchee	11,976	3,523	518	1,497	+9.1%
3	South China	11,182	2,289	1,016	1,398	−14.9%
4	Yuen Long	9,518	1,911	735	1,190	+17.6%
5	Eastern	7,677	1,811	522	960	−26.0%
6	Tai Po	6,635	1,449	379	829	n/a
7	YFCMD	6,076	1,075	447	760	+56.1%
8	Wong Tai Sin	5,552	1,448	345	694	n/a
9	Rangers	3,879	1,035	209	485	−2.4%
	League total	75,431	3,523	209	1,048	+12.8%

== Hong Kong Top Footballer Awards ==
Awards	Prize Winner	Club	Votes
Footballer of the Year	(Brazil) Giovane	Eastern	59.2%
Coach of the Year	Lee Chi Kin	YFCMD	38.63%
Young Players of the Year	Leung Kwun Chung	YFCMD	52.42%
Young Players of the Year	Chan Siu Kwan	South China	36.97%
Most Favorite Player	(Serbia) Bojan Mališić	South China	2,642
Hong Kong Top Footballers
Goalkeeper	Yapp Hung Fai	Eastern	53.15%
Defenders	(Serbia) Bojan Mališić	South China	56.44%
Defenders	Cheung Kin Fung	Kitchee	51.4%
Defenders	Lo Kwan Yee	Kitchee	46.96%
Defenders	Chan Wai Ho	South China	32.91%
Midfielders	Xu Deshuai	Kitchee	44.97%
Midfielders	Lam Ka Wai	Kitchee	42.55%
Midfielders	(Croatia) Miroslav Saric	Eastern	38.51%
Midfielders	(Cameroon) Mahama Awal	South China	31.42%
Forwards	(Brazil) Giovane	Eastern	59.2%
Forwards	(Spain) Juan Belencoso	Kitchee	39.57%
