= List of Hong Kong football transfers summer 2014 =

This list includes the transfers that took place in Hong Kong football in summer of 2014.

== Hong Kong First Division League ==
=== Biu Chun Rangers ===
In: Note: Flags indicate national team as defined under FIFA eligibility rules; some limited exceptions apply. Players may hold more than one non-FIFA nationality.

No.	Pos.	Nation	Player
—	DF	ESP	Oscar (from (Greece) Paniliakos)
—	FW	ESP	Yago González (from Southern)

Out: Note: Flags indicate national team as defined under FIFA eligibility rules; some limited exceptions apply. Players may hold more than one non-FIFA nationality.

No.	Pos.	Nation	Player
8	MF	CRO	Miroslav Šarić (to Eastern)

=== Citizen ===
In: Note: Flags indicate national team as defined under FIFA eligibility rules; some limited exceptions apply. Players may hold more than one non-FIFA nationality.

No.	Pos.	Nation	Player

Out: Note: Flags indicate national team as defined under FIFA eligibility rules; some limited exceptions apply. Players may hold more than one non-FIFA nationality.

No.	Pos.	Nation	Player
9	FW	BRA	Stefan (to Jacuipense)

=== Eastern ===
In: Note: Flags indicate national team as defined under FIFA eligibility rules; some limited exceptions apply. Players may hold more than one non-FIFA nationality.

No.	Pos.	Nation	Player
—	MF	CRO	Miroslav Šarić (from Biu Chun Rangers)
—	DF	BRA	Roberto Júnior (from Sun Hei)
—	FW	BRA	Michel Lugo (from Sun Hei)
—	FW	BRA	Reinaldo Gaucho (from Sun Hei)
—	DF	CMR	Jean-Jacques Kilama (from Sun Hei)
—	GK	HKG	Yapp Hung Fai (from South China)
—	DF	HKG	Pak Wing Chak (from Southern District)

Out: Note: Flags indicate national team as defined under FIFA eligibility rules; some limited exceptions apply. Players may hold more than one non-FIFA nationality.

No.	Pos.	Nation	Player
—	MF	BRA	Itaparica (to South China)

=== South China ===
In: Note: Flags indicate national team as defined under FIFA eligibility rules; some limited exceptions apply. Players may hold more than one non-FIFA nationality.

No.	Pos.	Nation	Player
—	DF	HKG	Che Runqiu (from Tai Po)
21	FW	JPN	Yuto Nakamura (from Eastern)
11	MF	BRA	Itaparica (from Eastern)
—	GK	HKG	Tsang Man Fai (loan return from Southern District)

Out: Note: Flags indicate national team as defined under FIFA eligibility rules; some limited exceptions apply. Players may hold more than one non-FIFA nationality.

No.	Pos.	Nation	Player
—	FW	HKG	Lee Hong Lim (to Sun Pegasus)
—	FW	BIH	Saša Kajkut (to (Greece) Kerkyra)
—	GK	HKG	Yapp Hung Fai (to Eastern)

=== Southern ===
In: Note: Flags indicate national team as defined under FIFA eligibility rules; some limited exceptions apply. Players may hold more than one non-FIFA nationality.

No.	Pos.	Nation	Player

Out: Note: Flags indicate national team as defined under FIFA eligibility rules; some limited exceptions apply. Players may hold more than one non-FIFA nationality.

No.	Pos.	Nation	Player
8	FW	ESP	Yago González (to Biu Chun Rangers)
5	DF	ESP	Rubén López (to Yokohama FC Hong Kong)
10	FW	ESP	Dieguito (to Yokohama FC Hong Kong)

=== Sun Pegasus ===
In: Note: Flags indicate national team as defined under FIFA eligibility rules; some limited exceptions apply. Players may hold more than one non-FIFA nationality.

No.	Pos.	Nation	Player
1	GK	AUS	Jerrad Tyson (from Western Sydney Wanderers)
11	FW	HKG	Lee Hong Lim (from South China)
25	MF	HKG	Ip Chung Long (from Southern District)
—	MF	BIH	Dario Damjanović (from Jagodina)

Out: Note: Flags indicate national team as defined under FIFA eligibility rules; some limited exceptions apply. Players may hold more than one non-FIFA nationality.

No.	Pos.	Nation	Player

=== Yokohama FC Hong Kong ===
In: Note: Flags indicate national team as defined under FIFA eligibility rules; some limited exceptions apply. Players may hold more than one non-FIFA nationality.

No.	Pos.	Nation	Player
—	DF	ESP	Rubén López (from Southern)
—	FW	ESP	Dieguito (from Southern)

Out: Note: Flags indicate national team as defined under FIFA eligibility rules; some limited exceptions apply. Players may hold more than one non-FIFA nationality.

No.	Pos.	Nation	Player
