= 2012–13 Hong Kong Junior Challenge Shield =

Hong Kong Junior Shield
Tournament details
- Country: Hong Kong
- Teams: 40

Final positions
- Champions: Yueng Long (1st title)
- Runners-up: Kwai Tsing

Tournament statistics
- Matches played: 39
- Goals scored: 181 (4.64 per match)

The 2012–13 Hong Kong Junior Shield is the 85th season of the Hong Kong Junior Shield, a knock-out competition for Hong Kong's 40 football clubs playing below the top-tier division league. Wanchai are the defending champions, having beaten Happy Valley in the 2012 Final.

== Schedule ==
The schedule for the Hong Kong Junior Shield is as follows:

Round	Main date	Number of fixtures	Clubs
First round	16 Deceober 2012	8	40 → 32
Second round	23 December 2012	16	32 → 16
Third round	6 January 2013	8	16 → 8
Quarter-finals	13 January 2013	4	8 → 4
Semi-finals	20 January 2013	2	4 → 2
Final	27 January 2013	1	2 → 1

== First round ==
16 teams out of 40 teams are randomly drawn and required to compete starting from the first round, while other 24 teams will start from the second round. The eight matches will all be played on 16 December 2012.

16 December 2012	Tuen Mun FC (2)	4 – 2	Lung Moon (4)	Wong Tai Sin, Kowloon
13:00(GMT+8)	Or Ho Yin 2', 44'; Yau Kai Pong 45'; Sin Chi Ho (yellow card) 50'; Wong Wai Tat 59'	Report	(yellow card) 3' Wong Chi Fai; (yellow card) 23' Hon Shui Lung; (yellow card) 70' Wong Ming Fung; 75', 79' Leung Chi Hin	Stadium: Po Kong Village Road Park #2

16 December 2012	New Fair Kuitan (3)	0 – 10	Yuen Long (2)	Wong Tai Sin, Kowloon
13:00(GMT+8)	She Pat Hong (red card) 41'; Hui Wing Keung (yellow card) 46'	Report	2', 30', 44' (pen.), 60', 85' Yu Ho Pong; 39' Yan Wai Hong; 65', 88' Yick Chi Ho; 82' Hon Shing; 83' Chan Ka Chun	Stadium: Po Kong Village Road Park #1

16 December 2012	Fire Services (3)	6 – 1	Ornament (4)	Happy Valley, Hong Kong Island
13:30(GMT+8)	Tang Kai Leung 16', 51'; Fung Ka Cheong 26'; Lee Wing Kei 32'; Li Kam Tim 55'; Tsui An Yeung 67'	Report	13' Daws; (yellow card) 25' Tong Tak Wai; (yellow card) 51' Vu Keng Lok	Stadium: Happy Valley #6

16 December 2012	Eastern District (3)	1 – 0	Fu Moon (3)	Tsing Yi, New Territories
13:30(GMT+8)	Wong Tak Ho (yellow card) 39'; Yeung Wing Shing (yellow card) 60'; Wong Tak Ho (yellow card) 74'	Report		Stadium: Tsing Yi Northeast Park

16 December 2012	Islands (4)	1 – 0	Tsuen Wan (3)	Wong Tai Sin, Kowloon
15:00(GMT+8)	Ho Ka Shing 65'	Report	(yellow card) 55' Tsang Siu Hong; (yellow card) 90' Chung Ho Ting	Stadium: Po Kong Village Road Park #2

16 December 2012	Double Flower (2)	3 – 2	Wing Yee (2)	Wong Tai Sin, Kowloon
15:00(GMT+8)	Poon Sing Yam (yellow card) 23'; Lam Wan Kit 26'; Lui Wai Chiu (yellow card) 28' (yellow-red card) 62'; Chau Chi Ming 45' (o.g.); Leung Sun Chi 57'	Report	20' Wong Leung Kit; (yellow card) 46' Yuen Tsun Tung; (yellow card) 55' Wong Kwok Keung; (red card) 62' Wong Leung Kit; (red card) 75' Ng Shung Hei; (yellow card) 85' Qehaja; 89' Ngassa	Stadium: Po Kong Village Road Park #1

16 December 2012	Sai Kung Friends (4)	2 – 1	St. Joseph's (4)	Happy Valley, Hong Kong Island
15:30(GMT+8)	Chan Wai Shing 14'; Chow Tik Hong (yellow card) 63'; Law Chi Shan (yellow card) 82'; Wong Ying Lun 85'	Report	(yellow card) 55' Chiu Yue Ting; 66' (pen.) Lo Chung Ming; (yellow card) 90' Chan Wai Tung	Stadium: Happy Valley #6

16 December 2012	Tai Chung (2)	7 – 0	Lucky Mile (3)	Tsing Yi, New Territories
15:30(GMT+8)	Ip Kwok Hei 16'; Hinson Leung 26', 47'; Losada 62'; Ho Min Tong 84', 90'; Chow Cheuk Hong 88'	Report		Stadium: Tsing Yi Northeast Park

== Second round ==
The second round draw included 8 first round winners and 24 teams that is not required to play in the first round. All second round matches will be played on 23 December 2012.

23 December 2012	Fukien (3)	1 – 4	Kwok Keung (3)	Wong Tai Sin, Kowloon
13:00(GMT+8)	Hui Wai Yan 18'	Report	4' Lee Yiu Lun; 26', 71' Mak Ho San; 62' Cheung Kwok Wai	Stadium: Po Kong Village Road Park #2

23 December 2012	Central & Western (4)	1 – 3	Wong Tai Sin (3)	Wong Tai Sin, Kowloon
13:00(GMT+8)		Report		Stadium: Po Kong Village Road Park #1

23 December 2012	Eastern Salon (2)	16 – 1	North District (4)	Happy Valley, Hong Kong Island
13:30(GMT+8)	Hui Ka Lok 11', 12', 22', 35'; Liu Cheuk Man 25' (o.g.); Wong Chun Hin 30', 63'; Wong Tsz Ho 32'; Yiu Ho Ming 52'; Leung Cheuk Yin 68', 75', 90' (yellow card) 80'; Tse Long Hin 70', 77', 84'; Au Wai Lun 87'	Report	(yellow card) 17' Lee Chi Yuk; 75' Au Chun Hong	Stadium: Happy Valley #6

23 December 2012	Shatin (2)	1 – 1 (5 – 3 p)	Double Flower (2)	Ma On Shan, New Territories
13:30(GMT+8)		Report		Stadium: Ma On Shan Recreation Ground

23 December 2012	Happy Valley (2)	5 – 0	Eastern District (3)	Tai Po, New Territories
13:30(GMT+8)		Report		Stadium: Kwong Fuk Park

23 December 2012	Wanchai (2)	2 – 1	Fire Services (3)	Causeway Bay, Hong Kong Island
13:30(GMT+8)		Report		Stadium: Causeway Bay Sports Ground

23 December 2012	KCDRSC (3)	1 – 1 (3 – 4 p)	Blake Garden (4)	Tsing Yi, New Territories
13:30(GMT+8)		Report		Stadium: Tsing Yi Northeast Park

23 December 2012	Telecom (3)	1 – 3	Tuen Mun FC (2)	Sham Shui Po, Kowloon
13:30(GMT+8)		Report		Stadium: Tai Hang Tung #2

23 December 2012	Tung Sing (4)	2 – 1	Solon (4)	Wong Tai Sin, Kowloon
15:00(GMT+8)		Report		Stadium: Po Kong Village Road Park #2

23 December 2012	Hong Kong FC (2)	2 – 0	Sham Shui Po (2)	Wong Tai Sin, Kowloon
15:00(GMT+8)		Report		Stadium: Po Kong Village Road Park #1

23 December 2012	Mutual (3)	5 – 0	Kwun Tong (3)	Happy Valley, Hong Kong Island
15:30(GMT+8)		Report		Stadium: Happy Valley #6

23 December 2012	Kwong Wah (4)	0 – 1	Yuen Long (2)	Ma On Shan, New Territories
15:30(GMT+8)		Report		Stadium: Ma On Shan Recreation Ground

23 December 2012	Kowloon City (3)	0 – 1	Tai Chung (2)	Tai Po, New Territories
15:30(GMT+8)		Report		Stadium: Kwong Fuk Park

23 December 2012	Sun Source (3)	2 – 1	Sai Kung Friends (4)	Causeway Bay, Hong Kong Island
15:30(GMT+8)		Report		Stadium: Causeway Bay Sports Ground

23 December 2012	Sai Kung (4)	0 – 5	Yau Tsim Mong (4)	Tsing Yi, New Territories
15:30(GMT+8)		Report		Stadium: Tsing Yi Northeast Park

23 December 2012	Kwai Tsing (3)	8 – 1	Islands (4)	Sham Shui Po, Kowloon
15:30(GMT+8)		Report		Stadium: Tai Hang Tung #2

== Third round ==
16 second round winners will fight for 8 quarter-finals places on 6 January 2013.

6 January 2013	Tuen Mun FC (2)	0 – 3	Kwai Tsing (3)	Ma On Shan, New Territories
13:00(GMT+8)		Report		Stadium: Ma On Shan Recreation Ground

6 January 2013	Wong Tai Sin (3)	1 – 7	Hong Kong FC (2)	Tsing Yi, New Territories
13:00(GMT+8)		Report		Stadium: Tsing Yi Northeast Park

6 January 2013	Happy Valley (2)	1 – 0	Tai Chung (2)	Tsuen Wan, New Territories
13:00(GMT+8)		Report		Stadium: Tsuen Wan Riviera Park

6 January 2013	Eastern Salon (2)	2 – 1	Mutual (3)	Happy Valley, Hong Kong Island
13:00(GMT+8)		Report		Stadium: Happy Valley #5

6 January 2013	Wanchai (2)	1 – 3	Sun Source (3)	Happy Valley, Hong Kong Island
15:15(GMT+8)		Report		Stadium: Happy Valley #5

6 January 2013	Kwok Keung (3)	6 – 1	Tung Sing (4)	Ma On Shan, New Territories
15:15(GMT+8)		Report		Stadium: Ma On Shan Recreation Ground

6 January 2013	Shatin (2)	1 – 4	Yuen Long (2)	Tsing Yi, New Territories
15:15(GMT+8)		Report		Stadium: Tsing Yi Northeast Park

6 January 2013	Blake Garden (4)	1 – 9	Yau Tsim Mong (4)	Tsuen Wan, New Territories
15:15(GMT+8)		Report		Stadium: Tsuen Wan Riviera Park

== Quarter-finals ==
8 third round winners will strive for 4 semi-finals places on 13 January 2013. All matches will be played at Po Kong Village Road Park. Yau Tsim Mong from Fourth Division is the lowest team still in the competition.

13 January 2013	Hong Kong FC (2)	0 – 1	Yuen Long (2)	Wong Tai Sin, Kowloon
13:00(GMT+8)		Report		Stadium: Po Kong Village Road Park #1

13 January 2013	Eastern Salon (2)	1 – 1 (3 – 0 p)	Sun Source (3)	Wong Tai Sin, Kowloon
13:00(GMT+8)		Report		Stadium: Po Kong Village Road Park #2

13 January 2013	Happy Valley (2)	2 – 0	Yau Tsim Mong (4)	Wong Tai Sin, Kowloon
15:00(GMT+8)		Report		Stadium: Po Kong Village Road Park #1

13 January 2013	Kwai Tsing (3)	6 – 1	Kwok Keung (3)	Wong Tai Sin, Kowloon
15:00(GMT+8)		Report		Stadium: Po Kong Village Road Park #2

== Semi-finals ==
4 quarter-finals winners will strive for 2 final places on 20 January 2013. All matches will be played at Po Kong Village Road Park. Kwai Tsing from Third Division is the lowest team still in the competition.

20 January 2013	Eastern Salon (2)	2 – 2 (3 – 5 p)	Kwai Tsing (3)	Wong Tai Sin, Kowloon
13:00(GMT+8)				Stadium: Po Kong Village Road Park #1

20 January 2013	Yuen Long (2)	4 – 1	Happy Valley (2)	Wong Tai Sin, Kowloon
15:00(GMT+8)				Stadium: Po Kong Village Road Park #2

== Final ==
Yuen Long defeated Kwok Keung in the final and won the champions.

27 January 2013	Kwai Tsing (3)	2 – 6	Yuen Long (2)	So Kon Po, Hong Kong Island
13:00(GMT+8)		Report		Stadium: Hong Kong Stadium (Capacity: 40,000)
