= Blake Garden =

Blake Garden may refer to:

- Blake Garden, Hong Kong
- Blake Garden (Kensington, California), a public garden in the Berkeley Hills, overlooking the San Francisco Bay Area
- HK Blake Garden AA, a Hong Kong football club who competing in the Hong Kong Third A Division League
