= 2012 Hong Kong Women League FA Cup =

2012–13 Hong Kong Women League FA Cup
Tournament details
- Country: Hong Kong
- Teams: 10

Tournament statistics
- Matches played: 8
- Goals scored: 18 (2.25 per match)

2012 Hong Kong Women League FA Cup is the 1st edition of the structured Women League FA Cup. It is a knockout competition for all the teams of the 2012–13 Hong Kong Women League.

== Calendar ==
| Stage | Round | Date | Matches | Clubs |
|---|---|---|---|---|
| Knockout | First Round | 17 – 24 November 2012 | 2 | 10 → 8 |
| Knockout | Quarter-finals | 1 – 5 December 2012 | 4 | 8 → 4 |
| Knockout | Semi-finals | 8 December 2012 | 2 | 4 |
| Knockout | Third Place Match | 15 December 2012 at Causeway Bay Sports Ground | 1 | 2 → 1 |
| Knockout | Final | 15 December 2012 at Causeway Bay Sports Ground | 1 | 2 → 1 |

== Bracket ==
During the quarterfinal round, the HKFC vs Yin Tsing match was initially abandoned, with Yin Tsing winning the replay round. A third place match held on the same day as the final, 15 December 2012, pitted Citizen against Yin Tsing, with Citizen winning the match in a four goal shutout.

First Round
Tai Po | 0
Chelsea SS (HK) | 1
GoodBellas | 0
HKFC | 3

Quarterfinals
Citizen | 3
Chelsea SS (HK) | 0
Shatin | 1
Blake Garden | 2
HKIEd | 1 (1)
Sai Kung (PSO) | 1 (4)
HKFC | 0
Yin Tsing | 1

Semifinals
Citizen | 1
Blake Garden | 2
Sai Kung | 1
Yin Tsing | 0

Final
Blake Garden | 4
Sai Kung | 0
