= Hong Kong Third District Division League =

Hong Kong Third 'District' Division League
- Founded: 2002
- Folded: 2012
- Country: Hong Kong
- Confederation: AFC
- Number of clubs: 8
- Level on pyramid: 3
- Promotion to: Hong Kong Second Division League
- Relegation to: Hong Kong Fourth Division League
- Domestic cup(s): Hong Kong Junior Challenge Shield
- Last champions: Tsuen Wan (2011–12)
- Website: HKFA
- Current: 2011–12 Third Division League

Hong Kong Third 'District' Division League was a division of the third overall tier of the Hong Kong football league system organised by the Hong Kong Football Association in Hong Kong, along with Hong Kong Third 'A' Division League. It was folded in 2012 as Hong Kong Third 'A' Division League and Hong Kong Third 'District' Division League are merged into one.

Hong Kong Third 'District' Division League is introduced in 2002. It is played by teams sent by each District Council of Hong Kong. In the first season of the league, only 11 teams were sent. In the following season, all 18 district of Hong Kong had sent teams for the league. The first two teams of the league, with the first two teams of Hong Kong Third 'A' Division League, qualifies to the Hong Kong Third Division League final round. The champion and the second of the final round are promoted to the Hong Kong Second Division League. For other two teams, they are still in their third division league.

Teams from this division, as well as from Hong Kong Third 'A' Division League, enter the Hong Kong Junior Challenge Shield.

== Project Phoenix ==
Project Phoenix is a project held by Hong Kong Football Association which aims to make changes on and help Hong Kong football to develop. The project suggests to merge Hong Kong Third 'A' Division League and Hong Kong Third 'District' Division League into one and form the Hong Kong Fourth Division League which will be the bottom tier of Hong Kong football league system.

Starting from 2011 to 2012 season, the two divisions of Hong Kong Third Division League will merge into one. Teams of Third Division League in the 2012–13 team are the 2 final round losing team and the 3rd to 10th placed teams of Hong Kong Third A Division League, along with the 3rd and 4th placed teams of Hong Kong Third District Division League. The remaining teams from Hong Kong Third A Division League and Hong Kong Third District Division League will compete in Hong Kong Fourth Division League in the 2012–13 season.

== Past winners ==
Season	Champions	1st Runner-up	2nd Runner-up
2002–03	Hong Kong 08	Tai Po	Sai Kung
2003–04	Tai Po	Kwai Tsing	Sham Shui Po
2004–05	Tuen Mun	Yau Tsim Mong	Sham Shui Po
2005–06	HKSSF	Yau Tsim Mong	Sham Shui Po
2006–07	Hong Kong 09	Southern	Wong Tai Sin
2007–08	Shatin	Southern	Tuen Mun
2008–09	Tuen Mun	Sai Kung	Sham Shui Po
2009–10	Sham Shui Po	Southern	Yuen Long
2010–11	Wanchai	Kwun Tong	Yau Tsim Mong
2011–12	Tsuen Wan	Eastern District	Wong Tai Sin

== See also ==
- Hong Kong Third Division League
- Hong Kong Third A Division League
