= Leung Kwun Chung =

Hong Kong footballer

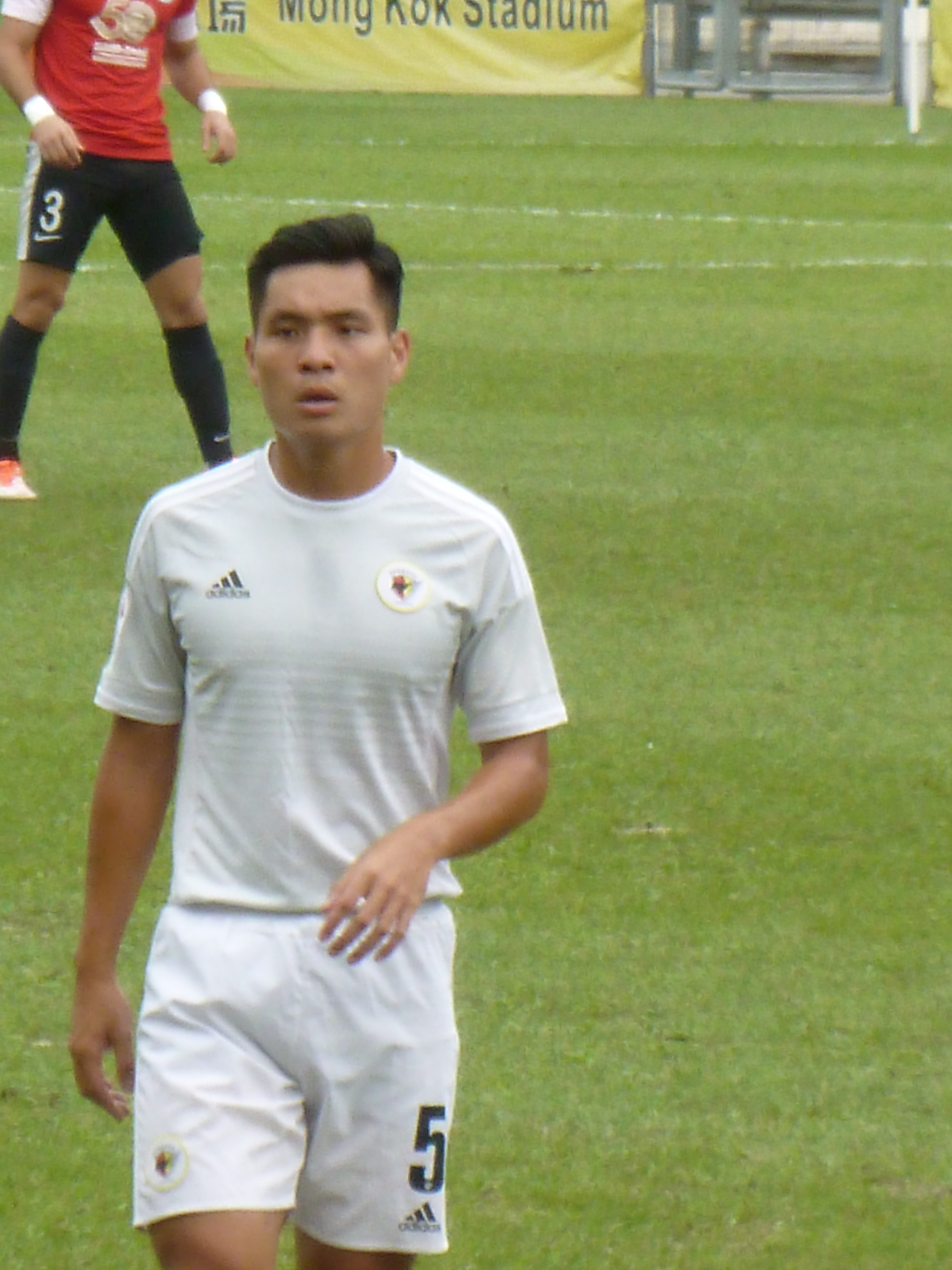

Personal information
- Full name: Rio Leung Kwun Chung
- Date of birth: 1 April 1992 (age 34)
- Place of birth: Hong Kong
- Height: 1.80 m (5 ft 11 in)
- Positions: Centre back; left back; defensive midfielder

Team information
- Current team: Eastern
- Number: 22

Senior career*
Years	Team	Apps	(Gls)
2008–2012	Sham Shui Po	17	(2)
2012–2015	YFCMD	46	(2)
2015–2016	Pegasus	13	(0)
2016–2017	South China	16	(0)
2017–2019	Tai Po	33	(0)
2019–	Eastern	95	(2)

International career^{‡}
2014	Hong Kong U–23	4	(0)
2016–2023	Hong Kong	10	(0)
- * Club domestic league appearances and goals as of 5 September 2026 ‡ National team caps and goals as of 19 June 2023

Leung Kwun Chung (Chinese: 梁冠聰; born 1 April 1992 in Hong Kong) is a Hong Kong professional football player who plays as a defensive midfielder for Hong Kong Premier League club Eastern.

He is the older brother of current Zhejiang Pro player Leung Nok Hang.

== Club career ==
Leung played for Hong Kong Third Division club Sham Shui Po when he was young.

In 2012, Leung signed for Hong Kong First Division club Yokohama FC Hong Kong.

On 18 May 2015, Leung won the Hong Kong Top Footballer Awards 2014/15 Best Youth Player.

Before the start of the 2015–16 Hong Kong Premier League, Leung signed for Hong Kong Premier League club Pegasus.

On 3 February 2016, Leung scored his first goal in the 2015–16 Hong Kong FA Cup against Hong Kong First Division club Wanchai, which wins the match 6:1.

On 6 June 2018, Leung confirmed that he had renewed his contract with Tai Po.

On 17 July 2019, Leung moved to Eastern.

== International career ==
On 31 December 2015, Leung played for Hong Kong against Guangdong in the 2016 Guangdong–Hong Kong Cup, which the match ended in a 4:5 loss in aggregate.

On 3 June 2016, Leung made his international debut for Hong Kong in a 2016 AYA Bank Cup match against Vietnam.

== Career statistics ==
=== International ===
National team	Year	Apps	Goals
Hong Kong	2016	1	0
Hong Kong	2017	0	0
Hong Kong	2018	0	0
Hong Kong	2019	0	0
Hong Kong	2020	0	0
Hong Kong	2021	1	0
Hong Kong	2022	6	0
Hong Kong	2023	2	0
Total		10	0

== Honours ==
=== Club ===
Sham Shui Po

- Hong Kong Second Division: 2010–11
- Hong Kong Third Division: 2009–10
- Hong Kong Third Division District League: 2009–10

Pegasus

- Hong Kong Sapling Cup: 2015–16

Tai Po

- Hong Kong Premier League: 2018–19

Eastern

- Hong Kong FA Cup: 2019–20, 2023–24, 2024–25
- Hong Kong Senior Shield: 2019–20, 2024–25

=== Individual ===
- HKTFA Best Young Player: 2014–15
