= Hong Kong Third A Division League =

Hong Kong Third 'A' Division League
- Founded: 1951
- Folded: 2012
- Country: Hong Kong
- Confederation: AFC
- Number of clubs: 19
- Level on pyramid: 3
- Promotion to: Hong Kong Second Division League
- Relegation to: Hong Kong Fourth Division League
- Domestic cup: Hong Kong Junior Challenge Shield
- Last champions: Eastern (2011–12)
- Website: HKFA
- Current: 2011–12 Third Division League

Hong Kong Third 'A' Division League was a division of the third overall tier of the Hong Kong football league system organised by the Hong Kong Football Association in Hong Kong, along with Hong Kong Third 'District' Division League. It was folded in 2012 as Hong Kong Third 'A' Division League and Hong Kong Third 'District' Division League are merged into one.

Hong Kong Third 'A' Division League is introduced in 1951. The first two teams of the league, with the first two teams of Hong Kong Third 'District' Division League, qualify to the Hong Kong Third Division League final round. The champion and the second of the final round are promoted to the Hong Kong Second Division League. For other two teams, they are still in their third division league.

Teams from this division, as well as from Hong Kong Third 'A' Division League, enter the Hong Kong Junior Challenge Shield.

== Project Phoenix ==
Project Phoenix is a project held by Hong Kong Football Association which aims to make changes on and help Hong Kong football to develop. The project suggests to merge Hong Kong Third 'A' Division League and Hong Kong Third 'District' Division League into one and form the Hong Kong Fourth Division League which will be the bottom tier of Hong Kong football league system.

Starting from 2011 to 2012 season, the two divisions of Hong Kong Third Division League will merge into one. Teams of Third Division League in the 2012–13 team are the 2 final round losing team and the 3rd to 10th placed teams of Hong Kong Third A Division League, along with the 3rd and 4th placed teams of Hong Kong Third District Division League. The remaining teams from Hong Kong Third A Division League and Hong Kong Third District Division League will compete in Hong Kong Fourth Division League in the 2012–13 season.

== See also ==
- Hong Kong Third Division League
- Hong Kong Third District Division League
- Hong Kong Third Division League final round
