= Chan Yuk Chi =

Hong Kong footballer

Chan Yuk Chi 陳旭智
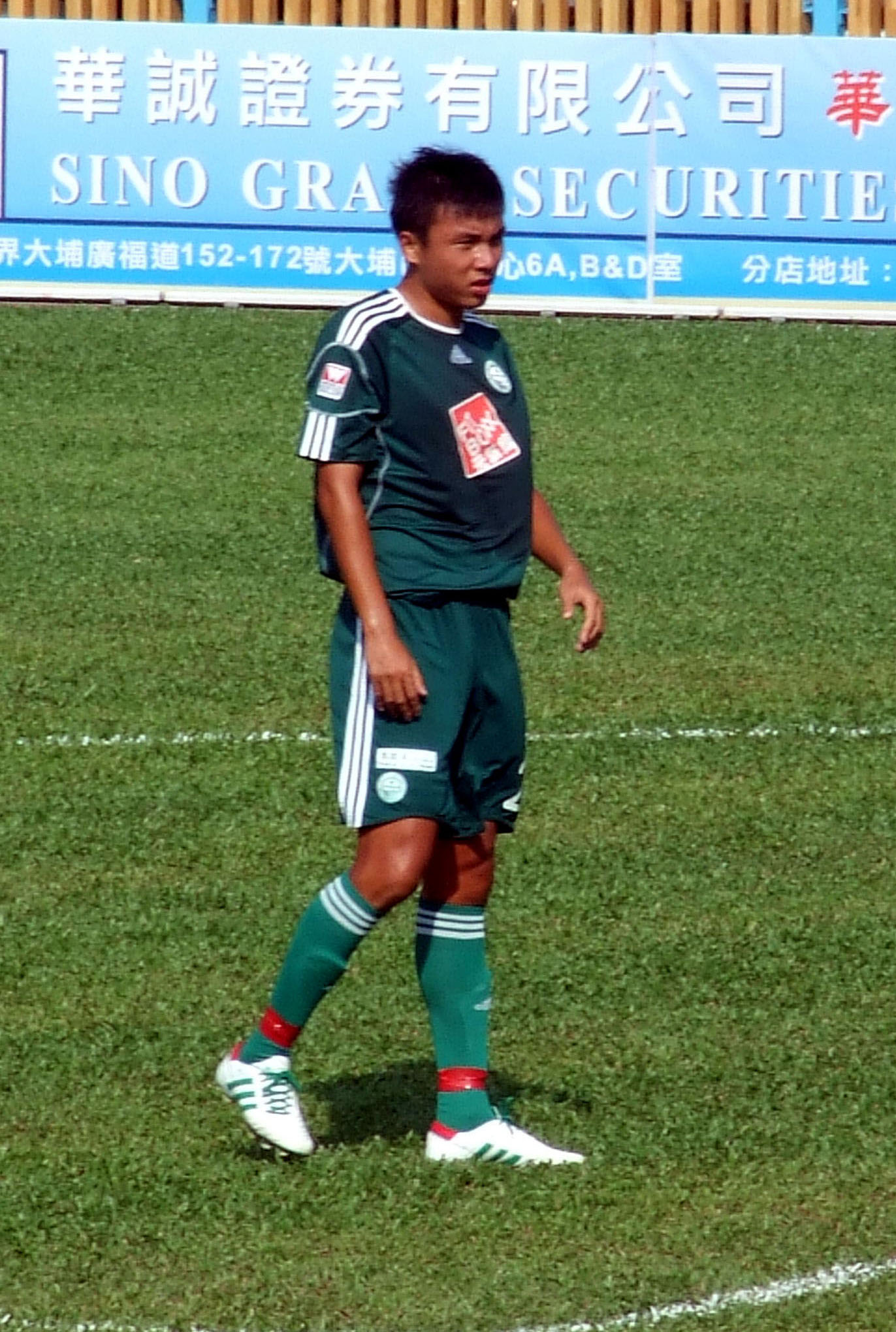

Personal information
- Full name: Chan Yuk Chi
- Date of birth: 8 September 1984 (age 42)
- Place of birth: Tai Po, Hong Kong
- Height: 1.85 m (6 ft 1 in)
- Position: Centre-back

Youth career
- Yee Hope
- Rangers

Senior career*
Years	Team	Apps	(Gls)
2002–2017	Tai Po	168	(6)

International career
- Hong Kong U-20

Managerial career
- 2017–2020: Tai Po (assistant coach)
- 2020–2022: Tai Po
- * Club domestic league appearances and goals as of 9 April 2017

Chan Yuk Chi (Chinese: 陳旭智; Cantonese Yale: Chàn Yūkji, born 8 September 1984) is a former Hong Kong professional footballer.

== Club career ==
Chan Yuk Chi was born in Hong Kong. He joined the youth team of Yee Hope and Hong Kong Rangers when he was in secondary school, but had chosen to give up his dreams on playing football and instead concentrated on studying due to the pressure of handling both sides.

When the Third District Division League was formed, Tai Po Football Club joined the league and Chan Yuk Chi has been part of the team from that point. After finishing the Hong Kong Advanced Level Examination (HKALE), Chan Yuk Chi continued his studies in Computer Science at the Hong Kong University of Science and Technology where he obtained a Bachelor of Engineering degree three years later.

During Chan Yuk Chi's time at university, he shared his time between studying and football again. After living in school dormitory for the first semester, Chan Yuk Chi moved back home for the rest of his university time, as it was more convenient to attend the Tai Po FC training sessions held in Tai Po. He also took up the responsibilities of a coach in the training sessions, as he is also a HKFA "C” Licence Coach.

At the time he graduated from the university, Tai Po Football Club obtained promotion from the 2nd division to the 1st Division and he became a professional football player since then (which is unusual in Hong Kong as the common recognised declining of Hong Kong Football). He told the media that he would as least take part in professional football for 2 years to see if he would be capable to achieve something in football. He has also mentioned on several occasions that being a professional football player was his dream, including in a conversation with Donald Tsang, the Chief Executive of Hong Kong.

Although not a guaranteed starter at Tai Po since the club was promoted, in his first 1st Division season Chan Yuk Chi still kept the captaincy and also experienced large portions of game minutes and many starting games, including playing and skippering the whole 90 minutes of the match in which Tai Po won against multiple cup winners Kitchee 2–1, where defender Joel scored the winner in the 90th minute from a direct free kick. He played for the club in 19 matches in total in the first season.

Apart from being a full-time player, Chan Yuk Chi was also an assistant secretary at the club.

Tai Po announced on 16 July 2017 that Chan had retired from football but remains in a coaching position at the club.

== Honours ==
Tai Po

- Hong Kong Third District Division League: 2003–04
- Hong Kong FA Cup: 2008–09
- Hong Kong Senior Challenge Shield: 2012–13
- Hong Kong Sapling Cup: 2016–17
