= 2011–12 Hong Kong Third Division League =

Hong Kong Third A Division League
- Season: 2011–12
- Champions: Eastern
- Promoted: Eastern; Tuen Mun FC
- Relegated: Lung Moon; Solon; Ornament; Sai Kung Friends; Tung SIng; Sun Source; Blake Garden; Kwong Wah; St. Joseph's
- Matches: 171
- Goals: 587 (3.43 per match)

Hong Kong Third District Division League
- Season: 2011–12
- Champions: Tsuen Wan
- Promoted: None
- Relegated: Central & Western; Sai Kung; Yau Tsim Mong; Northern District
- Matches: 56
- Goals: 168 (3 per match)

2011–12 Hong Kong Third Division League is divided into Hong Kong Third 'A' Division League and Hong Kong Third 'District' Division League. For the Third 'A' Division League, this year is the 61st season, while for the Third 'District' Division League, this year is the 10th season.

== Changes from last season ==
=== Team changes ===
==== From Third Division League ====
===== Promoted to Second Division League =====
- Wanchai
- Kwun Tong

==== To Third Division League ====
===== Relegated from Second Division League =====
- Fukien
- Lucky Mile

== League table ==
=== Third 'A' Division League ===
Pos	Team	Pld	W	D	L	GF	GA	GD	Pts	Qualification or relegation
1	Eastern (C, P)	18	18	0	0	64	8	+56	54	Third Division League Champions play-off
2	Tuen Mun FC (P)	18	11	4	3	51	21	+30	37	Third Division League Champions play-off
3	Fire Services	18	11	3	4	31	17	+14	36	
4	Fu Moon	18	10	3	5	23	16	+7	33	
5	New Fair Kui Tan	18	9	5	4	40	20	+20	32	
6	Telecom	18	9	4	5	36	30	+6	31	
7	Kwok Keung	18	9	3	6	34	19	+15	30	
8	Lucky Mile	18	8	5	5	35	23	+12	29	
9	Fukien	18	9	2	7	36	35	+1	29	
10	KCDRSC	18	8	4	6	28	28	0	28	
11	Lung Moon (R)	18	8	2	8	28	32	−4	26	Relegated to Fourth Division League
12	Solon (R)	18	7	3	8	27	27	0	24	Relegated to Fourth Division League
13	Ornament (R)	18	6	3	9	27	44	−17	21	Relegated to Fourth Division League
14	Sai Kung Friends (R)	18	6	3	9	21	28	−7	21	Relegated to Fourth Division League
15	Tung Sing (R)	18	6	0	12	19	34	−15	18	Relegated to Fourth Division League
16	Sun Source (R)	18	4	3	11	31	40	−9	15	Relegated to Fourth Division League
17	Blake Garden (R)	18	3	0	15	18	46	−28	9	Relegated to Fourth Division League
18	Kwong Wah (R)	18	2	2	14	20	57	−37	8	Relegated to Fourth Division League
19	St. Joseph's (R)	18	1	3	14	18	62	−44	6	Relegated to Fourth Division League

Updated to match(es) played on 25 March 2012. Source: HKFA
Rules for classification: 1) Points; 2) Head-to-Head a) Points b) Goal difference c) Number of goals scored; 3) Total goal difference; 4) Total number of goals scored.
(C) Champions; (P) Promoted; (R) Relegated

=== Third 'District' Division League ===
Pos	Team	Pld	W	D	L	GF	GA	GD	Pts	Qualification or relegation
1	Tsuen Wan	14	9	5	0	26	11	+15	32	Third Division League Champions play-off
2	Eastern District	14	7	3	4	21	14	+7	24	Third Division League Champions play-off
3	Wong Tai Sin	14	6	5	3	36	19	+17	23	
4	Kowloon City	14	6	3	5	28	19	+9	21	
5	Central & Western (R)	14	5	2	7	23	22	+1	17	Relegated to Fourth Division League
6	Sai Kung (R)	14	4	4	6	18	19	−1	16	Relegated to Fourth Division League
7	Yau Tsim Mong (R)	14	2	6	6	11	17	−6	12	Relegated to Fourth Division League
8	North District (R)	14	2	2	10	5	47	−42	8	Relegated to Fourth Division League

Updated to match(es) played on 15 March 2012. Source: HKFA
Rules for classification: 1) Points; 2) Head-to-Head a) Points b) Goal difference c) Number of goals scored; 3) Total goal difference; 4) Total number of goals scored.
(R) Relegated

== Champions play-off ==
=== Champions play-off ===
Pos	Team	Pld	W	D	L	GF	GA	GD	Pts	Promotion or qualification
1	Eastern (C, O, P)	3	3	0	0	8	2	+6	9	Champion, Promoted to Second Division League
2	Tuen Mun FC (P)	3	1	1	1	2	1	+1	4	Promoted to Second Division League
3	Tsuen Wan	3	1	1	1	5	6	−1	4	Remain at Third Division League
4	Eastern District	3	0	0	3	2	8	−6	0	Remain at Third Division League

Updated to match(es) played on 15 April 2012. Source: HKFA
Rules for classification: 1) Points; 2) Head-to-Head a) Points b) Goal difference c) Number of goals scored; 3) Total goal difference; 4) Total number of goals scored.
(C) Champions; (O) Play-off winners; (P) Promoted

== See also ==
- The Hong Kong Football Association
- Hong Kong First Division League
- Hong Kong Second Division League
- Hong Kong Third Division League
- 2010–11 Hong Kong Second Division League
