= Petrișor Voinea =

Romanian footballer

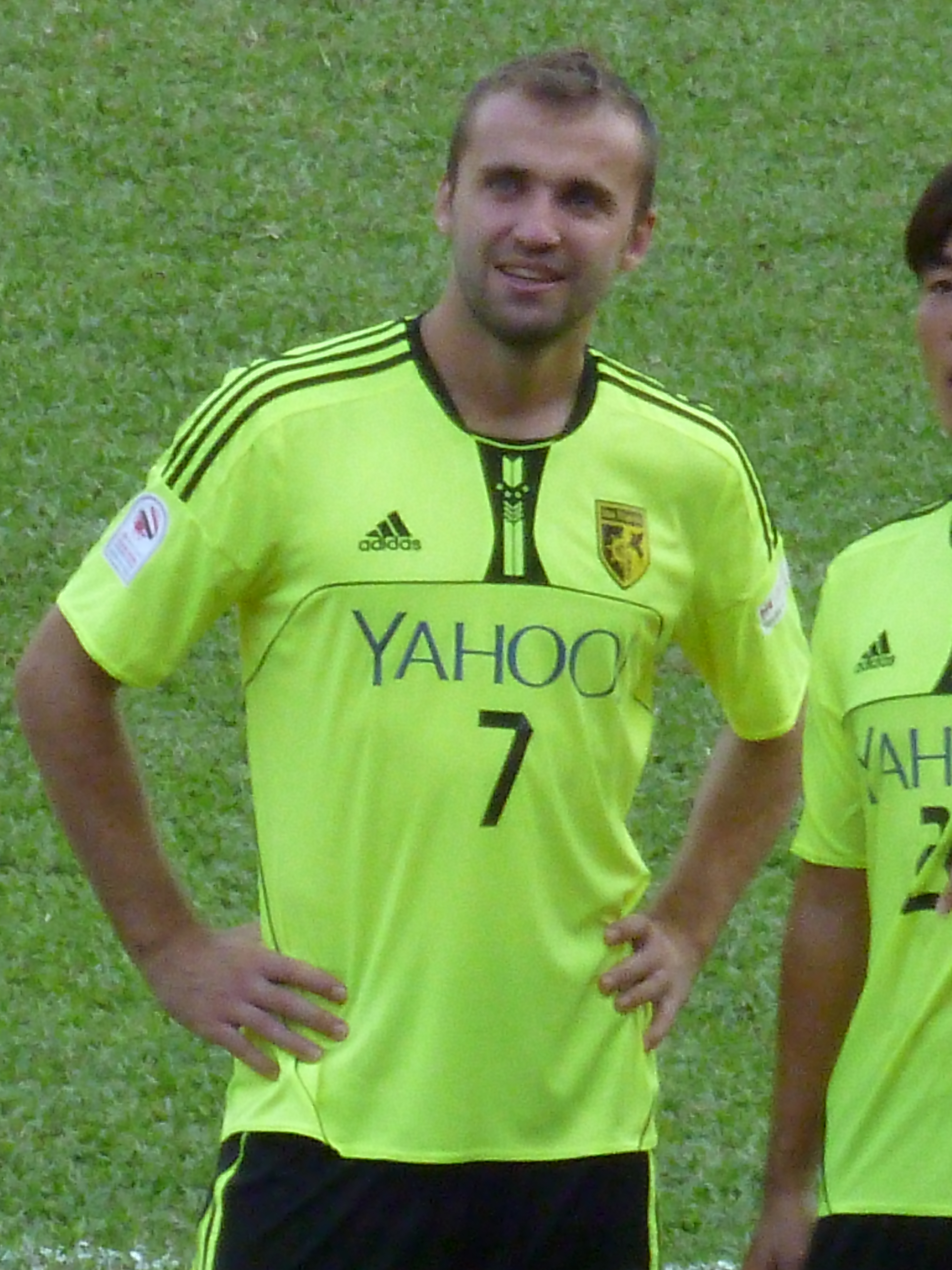
- Voinea in 2014

Personal information
- Date of birth: 28 May 1990 (age 36)
- Place of birth: Ivești, Romania
- Height: 1.88 m (6 ft 2 in)
- Positions: Winger; attacking midfielder; forward

Youth career
- 2007–2008: Sangiustese
- 2008–2009: Livorno

Senior career*
Years	Team	Apps	(Gls)
2009–2010	Sangiustese	7	(1)
2010–2011	Recanatese	20	(9)
2011–2012	Sambenedettese	24	(12)
2012–2013	Subasio	27	(14)
2013	Manduria	13	(8)
2014	Vissai Ninh Bình	8	(2)
2014	Sông Lam Nghệ An	11	(1)
2014–2015	Sun Pegasus	13	(4)
2015	Petrolul Ploiești	3	(0)
2016–2017	Wej SC	21	(11)
2018–2019	PDRM	15	(9)
2019-2020	Sanna Khánh Hòa BVN	11	(7)
2020	La Fiorita	4	(1)
2020–2021	Afif	15	(12)
2021	Victor San Marino		
2021–2022	Igea 1946		
2022–2023	Aurora Treia		
2023–2024	Afif		
2024	Al-Sharq		
- * Club domestic league appearances and goals as of 1 April 2020

Petrișor Voinea (born 28 May 1990) is a Romanian professional footballer who plays as a midfielder.

== Career ==
=== Italy ===
Petrișor began his football career in Italy having played with Livorno in their Primavera side, Petrișor was brought to professional football by Sangiustese who allowed him to debut in the 2009–10 Serie C2 season. He then went on to play for various other clubs in Italy. His last club in Italy was Manduria.

=== Vissai Ninh Bình ===
Petrișor has moved to Vissai Ninh Bình for the upcoming 2014 season in the Vietnamese V-League. He will also be partaking in the 2014 AFC Cup.

On 4 January 2014, Vissai Ninh Bình played in the Vietnam Super Cup against Hà Nội T&T. The game finished 2–2 in regular time but after penalties Vissai Ninh Bình proved they were the better team on the day and took home their first trophy of the season.

Voinea made his debut in the AFC Cup debut against South China at the Hong Kong Stadium. Playing a full 90minutes Voinea contributed to an important away win whilst collecting three points in the opening group match. He provided an assist for the opening goal and was instrumental in both his defensive and offensive roles. Voinea was rewarded for his performance by the 'Man of the Match' award.

In the second group match on 12 March 2014 against Yangon United Voinea again provided his worth to Vissai Ninh Bình as he scored and provided an assist in a 3–2 win to take his side to top of group G with six points in two matches.

Voinea scored his team's winning goal in an away win against Kelantan FA. The match finished 3–2 and Vissai Ninh Bình confirmed their place at the top of the group with a total of nine points and three wins out of three matches. So far Voinea has played 270 minutes in the 2014 AFC Cup.

In the 4th group match Voinea opened the scoring with a beautiful solo strike from outside the box. The final score against Kelantan FA at home in Vietnam was 4–0. This match gave Vissai Ninh Bình qualification to the round of 16 and only one more point is needed ensure they qualify as first in the group.

=== Sông Lam Nghệ An ===
After a match fixing scandal involving 10 of Voinea's teammates from Vissai Ninh Bình he was transferred to Sông Lam Nghệ An. For the remainder of the 2014 Eximbank V. League season he was to wear the number 77 as his standard number 7 was already taken by another teammate.

=== Sun Pegasus ===
Voinea signed a contract with Hong Kong-based club Sun Pegasus. After a good first season at the club Voinea along with all his teammates were forced to look for new clubs after the club owner decided not to renew its licence for the 2015–16 season.

=== Petrolul Ploiești ===
After attracting interest from various clubs in the Liga I Voinea agreed terms with Petrolul Ploiești on a contract that can potentially keep him at the club for the next three seasons. He made his debut for the club against Steaua București on the first gameweek of the 2015–16 season.

=== Wej SC ===
Voinea signed a contract with Wej SC and made a big impact in both the league and the cup.

== Career statistics ==
As of 8 January 2020

Appearances and goals by club, season and competition
Club	Season	League			Cup		Continental		Total	
Club	Season	Division	Apps	Goals	Apps	Goals	Apps	Goals	Apps	Goals
Sangiustese	2009–10	Lega Pro Seconda Divisione	7	1	2	0	—		9	1
Recanatese	2010–11	Serie D	20	9	3	1	—		23	10
Sambenedettese	2011–12	Serie D	24	12	3	2	—		27	14
Subasio	2012–13	Eccellenza	27	14	2	0	—		29	14
Manduria	2012–13	Eccellenza	13	8	2	1	—		15	9
Vissai Ninh Bình	2014	V-League	—		—		4 (Note: Appearances in AFC Cup)	3	4	3
Sông Lam Nghệ An	2014	V-League	11	1	—		—		11	1
Sun Pegasus	2014–15	Hong Kong Premier League	13	4	4	0	—		17	3
Petrolul Ploiești	2015–16	Liga I	2	0	—		—		2	0
Wej SC	2016–17	Saudi First Division	21	11	3	2	—		24	13
PDRM	2018	Malaysian Premier League	15	9	0	0	—		15	9
Sanna Khánh Hòa BVN	2019	V.League 1	11	7	0	0	—		11	7
Career total			164	76	19	7	4	3	187	84

== Honours ==
Vissai Ninh Bình

- Vietnamese Super Cup: 2014
