= Lawrence Akandu =

Nigerian-born Hong Kong football player

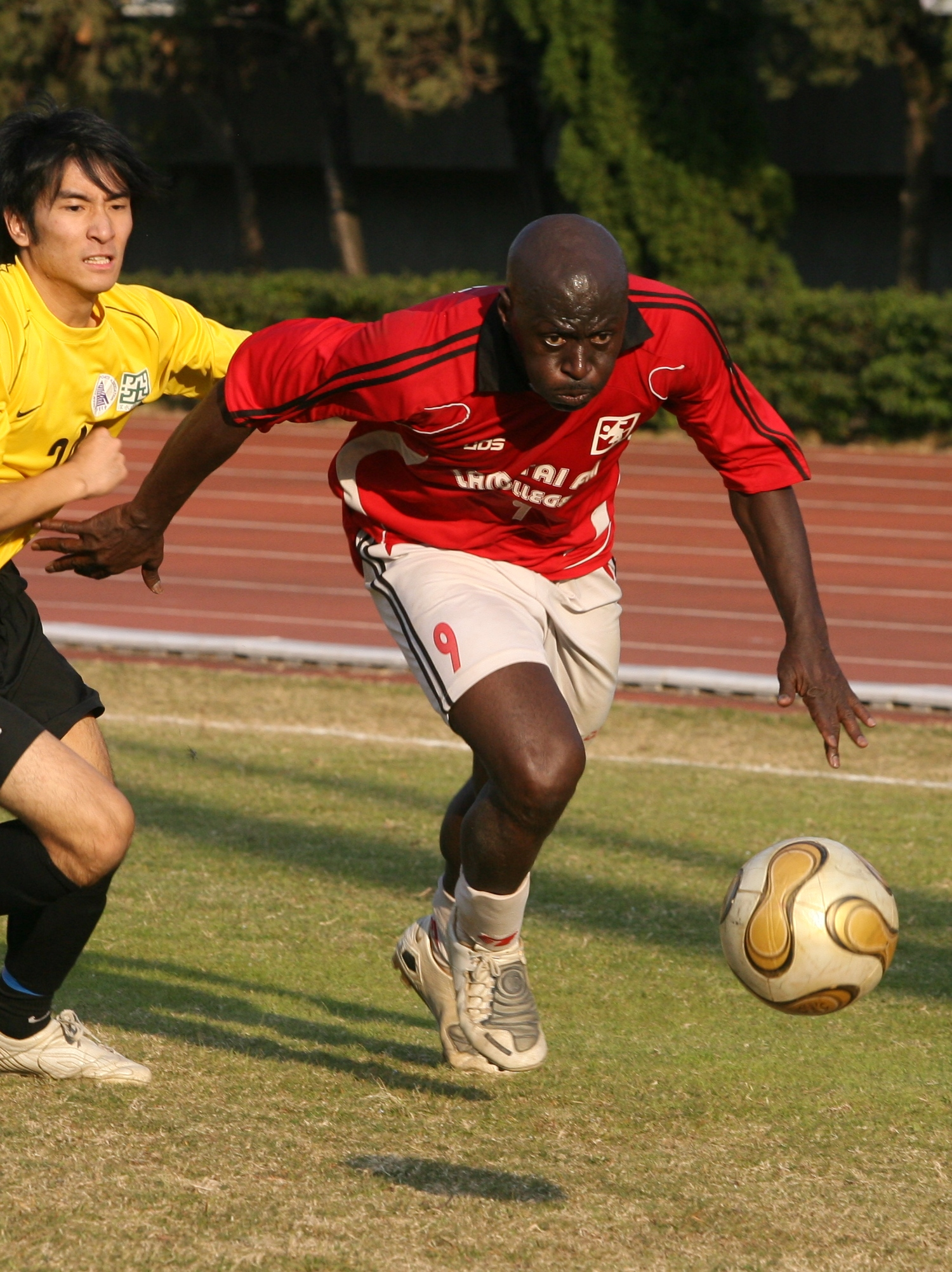

Personal information
- Full name: Lawrence Chimezie Akandu
- Date of birth: 10 December 1974 (age 51)
- Place of birth: Benin City, Nigeria
- Height: 1.88 m (6 ft 2 in)
- Position: Forward

Youth career
- 1991–1992: Sharks F.C.
- 1993–1994: Wisła Kraków

Senior career*
Years	Team	Apps	(Gls)
1994–1996	Frankwell		
1996–1997	Five-One-Seven		
1997–2002	Tung Po		
2002–2003	Kitchee		(15)
2003–2005	Happy Valley	28	(13)
2005–2006	Tung Po	21	(23)
2006–2007	HKFC	13	(2)
2007–2009	Shatin	28	(17)
2009–2012	Mutual	7	(7)
2012–2013	Yuen Long	0	(0)
2013–2014	Kwong Wah		
2014–2015	Sun Source		
2015–2018	Mutual	19	(6)

International career^{‡}
2003–2004	Hong Kong	7	(1)
- * Club domestic league appearances and goals as of 17 May 2016 ‡ National team caps and goals as of 14 November 2009

Lawrence Chimezie Akandu (Chinese: 羅倫士 Lawrence, born 10 December 1974) is a former professional footballer who played as a forward. Born in Nigeria, he represented Hong Kong internationally.

== Club career ==
=== Early career ===
Akandu started his career and made his name as a centre forward but has become a defender.

Akandu moved to Hong Kong from the Polish club Wisła Kraków in 1994. He played for Hong Kong First Division side Frankwell, Five-One-Seven, Tung Po.

In the summer of 2002, Akandu joined the Hong Kong Second Division club Kitchee. As a physically powerful centre forward, he scored 15 goals in the 2002–03 season, helping Kitchee earn promotion to the Hong Kong First Division.

=== Happy Valley ===
In 2003–04 season, Akandu joined Happy Valley, one of the top teams in the Hong Kong First Division League. Despite lack of first division experience, he quickly adapted in the competition. He scored ten goals in the first-half season and led the Top Soccer table.

== International career ==
In November 2003, Akandu acquired Hong Kong permanent resident status and played as a striker in the Hong Kong national football team. He scored on his debut for Hong Kong in the East Asian Football Championship 2003 against Korea Republic on 4 December 2003, where he scored the only goal for Hong Kong.

== Honours ==
Kitchee

- Hong Kong Second Division League: 2002–03

Happy Valley

- Hong Kong Senior Shield: 2003–04
- Hong Kong FA Cup: 2003–04

Tung Po

- Hong Kong Junior Shield: 2005–06

Shatin

- Hong Kong Junior Shield: 2007–08
- Hong Kong Third Division League: 2007–08
- Hong Kong Junior Shield: 2008–09
- Hong Kong Second Division League: 2008–09

== Career statistics ==
=== Club ===
As of 14 November 2009

Club	Season	League		League Cup		Senior Shield		FA Cup		AFC Cup		Total	
Club	Season	Apps	Goals	Apps	Goals	Apps	Goals	Apps	Goals	Apps	Goals	Apps	Goals
Happy Valley	2003–04	14	9	5	1	3	0	3	1	6	3	31	14
Happy Valley	2004–05	14	4	1	0	2	0	3	1	—	—	19	5
Happy Valley	Total	28	13	6	1	5	0	6	2	6	3	50	19
Club	Season	League		—		Junior Shield		—		—		Total	
Club	Season	Apps	Goals	Apps	Goals	Apps	Goals	Apps	Goals	Apps	Goals	Apps	Goals
Tung Po	2005–06	21	21	—	—	2	2	—	—	—	—	23	23
Tung Po	Total	21	21	—	—	2	2	—	—	—	—	23	23
Club	Season	League		League Cup		Senior Shield		FA Cup		AFC Cup		Total	
Club	Season	Apps	Goals	Apps	Goals	Apps	Goals	Apps	Goals	Apps	Goals	Apps	Goals
Hong Kong FC	2006–07	13	2	0	0	2	0	1	0	—	—	16	2
Hong Kong FC	Total	13	2	0	0	2	0	1	0	—	—	16	2
Club	Season	League		—		Junior Shield		FA Cup		—		Total	
Club	Season	Apps	Goals	Apps	Goals	Apps	Goals	Apps	Goals	Apps	Goals	Apps	Goals
Shatin SA	2007–08	4	4	—	—	0	0	—	—	—	—	4	4
Shatin SA	Season	League		—		Junior Shield		FA Cup		—		Total	
Shatin SA	2008–09	16	13	—	—	5	5	1	0	—	—	22	18
Shatin SA	Total	20	17	—	—	5	5	1	0	—	—	26	22
Mutual FC	2009–10	7	7	—	—			—	—	—	—	7	7
Mutual FC	Total	7	7	—	—	5	5	—	—	—	—	7	7
Career Total													

=== International ===
As of 15 January 2007

#	Date	Venue	Opponents	Result	Goals	Competition
1	4 December 2003	Tokyo, Japan	South Korea	1–3	1	East Asian Cup 2003
2	7 December 2003	Saitama, Japan	Japan	0–1	0	East Asian Cup 2003
3	10 December 2003	Yokohama, Japan	China	1–3	0	East Asian Cup 2003
4	19 February 2004	Kuantan, Malaysia	Malaysia	3–1	0	FIFA World Cup 2006 Qual.
5	9 June 2004	Kuwait City, Kuwait	Kuwait	0–4	0	FIFA World Cup 2006 Qual.
6	8 September 2004	Hong Kong, Hong Kong	Kuwait	0–2	0	FIFA World Cup 2006 Qual.
7	17 November 2004	Hong Kong, Hong Kong	China	0–7	0	FIFA World Cup 2006 Qual.
