= Chan Hung Ping =

Taiwanese football manager

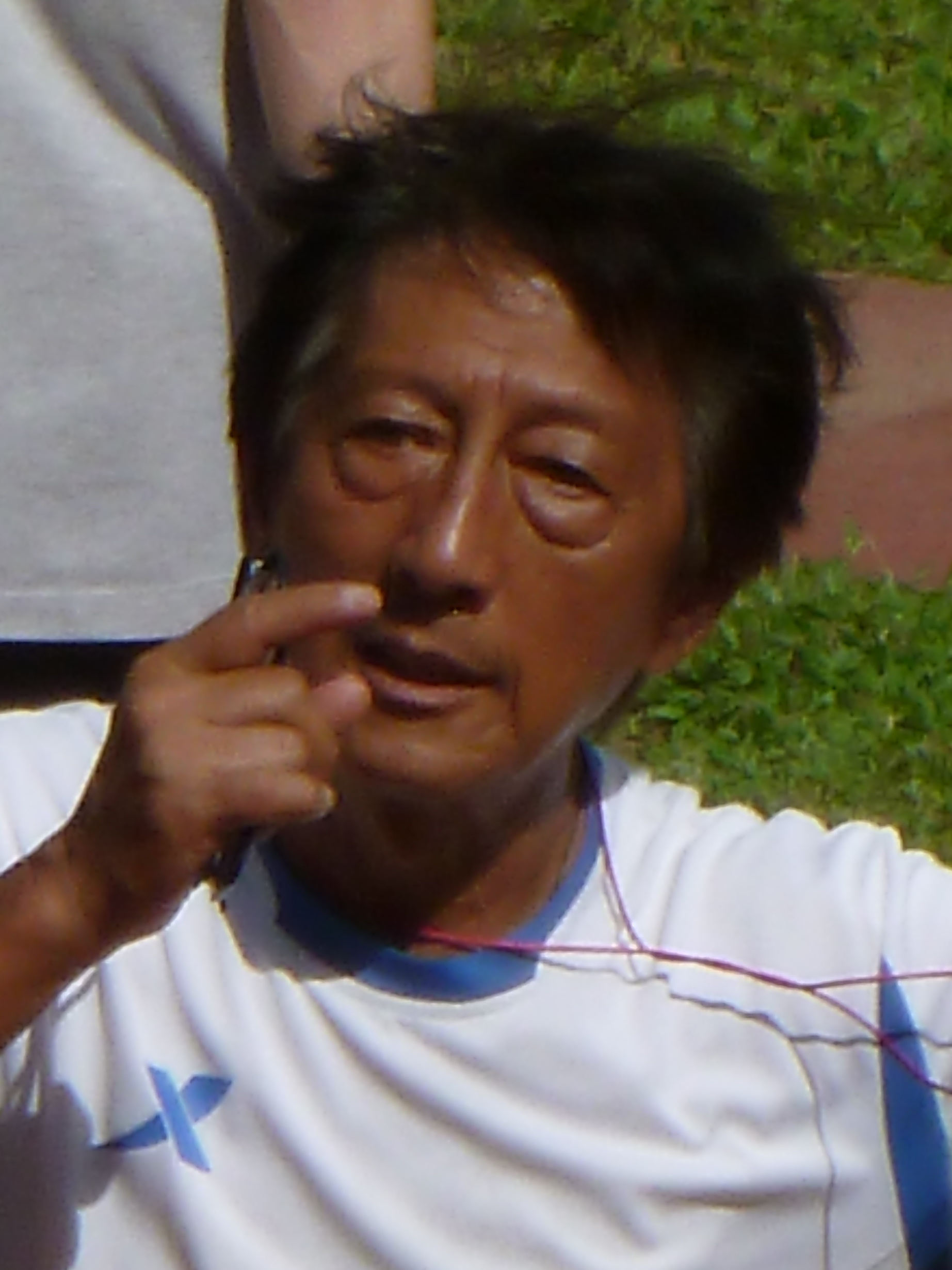

Personal information
- Date of birth: 6 December 1942 (age 83)
- Place of birth: Taiwan
- Position: Midfielder

Senior career*
Years	Team	Apps	(Gls)
–1967	Happy Valley		
1967–1968	Yuen Long		
1968–1971	Jardine		
1971–1972	Yuen Long		
1972–1976	Seiko		
1976–1980	Sea Bee		

International career
–1968	Chinese Taipei		

Managerial career
- 1984–1989: Sea Bee
- 1989–1991: Sing Tao
- 1991–1995: Eastern
- 1993: Hong Kong
- 1995–1996: Minxin
- 1996–1997: Sing Tao
- 1997–2002: Happy Valley
- 2002–2003: Kitchee
- 2003–2005: Happy Valley
- 2005–2006: Citizen
- 2007–2008: Happy Valley
- 2009–2012: Fourway
- 2012–2013: Rangers (HKG)
- 2017–2024: Lee Man (Technical director)
- 2025–: Rangers (HKG) (Advisor)
- * Club domestic league appearances and goals

Chan Hung Ping (Chinese: 陳鴻平; born on 6 December 1942 in Taiwan) is a Taiwanese football manager.

== Career ==
Despite spending most of his life in Hong Kong, Chan decided to represent Taiwan internationally due to the better treatment, payment, and popularity in Southeast Asia.
