= Hong Kong Schools Sports Federation football team =

Hong Kong Schools Sports Federation football team was a football team established by Hong Kong Schools Sports Federation and formed by students from Hong Kong secondary schools. They last competed in Hong Kong Third District Division League before it was dissolved in the 2011–12 season.

== Seasons Records ==
Season	Div.	Pos.	Pld	W	D	L	GF	GA	GD	Pts	Junior Shield	Notes
2005–06	D3D	1st (out of 16)	15	10	3	2	27	16	11	33	Round of 16	3rd in the 3rd Division League Final Round. Not promoted
2006–07	D3D	9th (out of 17)	16	6	4	6	24	21	3	22	1st Round	
2007–08	D3D	11th (out of 16)	15	4	5	6	26	28	−2	17	1st Round	
2008–09	D3D	5th (out of 15)	14	7	2	5	27	21	6	23	1st Round	
2009–10	D3D	10th (out of 14)	13	4	2	7	22	24	−2	14	Not Held	
2010–11	D3D	11th (out of 11)	20	3	1	16	21	58	−37	10	1st Round	4th in the 3rd Division League Relegation Playoff
