= 2009–10 Hong Kong Third Division League =

2009–10 Hong Kong Third Division League is one of the seasons of Hong Kong Third Division League.

== League table ==
=== Third Division "District" ===
Pos	Team	Pld	W	D	L	GF	GA	GD	Pts	Promotion
1	Sham Shui Po (C, P)	13	12	1	0	49	7	+42	37	Promotion to First Division League
2	Southern (P)	13	10	3	0	38	7	+31	33	Promotion to First Division League
3	Yuen Long	13	10	2	1	40	10	+30	32	
4	Tsuen Wan	13	8	2	3	17	15	+2	26	
5	Kwun Tong	13	6	3	4	26	12	+14	21	
6	Wong Tai Sin	13	5	3	5	29	21	+8	18	
7	Yau Tsim Mong	13	4	4	5	23	28	−5	16	
8	North District	13	4	3	6	19	35	−16	15	
9	Kowloon City	13	4	2	7	31	31	0	14	
10	HKSSF	13	4	2	7	22	24	−2	14	
11	Central & Western	13	4	1	8	21	29	−8	13	
12	Sai Kung	13	1	6	6	18	33	−15	9	
13	Eastern	13	1	1	11	12	48	−36	4	
14	Wanchai	13	1	1	11	10	55	−45	4	

Updated to match(es) played on 4 April 2010. Source: Hong Kong Football Association
Rules for classification: 1) points; 2) goal difference; 3) number of goals scored.
(C) Champions; (P) Promoted
