= João Sales =

Brazilian footballer (born 1986)

Personal information
- Full name: João Francisco de Sales
- Date of birth: June 9, 1986 (age 40)
- Place of birth: Presidente Prudente, Brazil
- Height: 1.83 m (6 ft 0 in)
- Position: Striker

Youth career
- 2004: Tanabi

Senior career*
Years	Team	Apps	(Gls)
2005	America SP		
2006	São Caetano		
2006–2007	Slovan Liberec	5	(0)
2008	Grêmio Catanduvense		
2008	Ventforet Kofu	18	(6)
2009	Mogi Mirim	8	(3)
2009	Vegalta Sendai	12	(2)
2010	Yokohama FC	6	(0)
2010–2011	Bragantino	22	(2)
2011	Icasa	10	(2)
2012	Arapongas	11	(2)
2012	Beroe Stara Zagora	9	(0)
2013	CA Linense	10	(4)
2013	Vila Nova	4	(0)
2015	Tai Po	6	(0)
- * Club domestic league appearances and goals as of 15 June 2012

Joáo Francisco de Sales or simply Sales (born June 9, 1986) is a Brazilian striker, who plays for CA Linense.

== Club statistics ==
Club performance			League		Cup		Total	
Season	Club	League	Apps	Goals	Apps	Goals	Apps	Goals
Japan			League		Emperor's Cup		Total	
2008	Ventforet Kofu	J2 League	18	6	2	0	20	6
2009	Vegalta Sendai	J2 League	12	2	2	0	14	2
2010	Yokohama FC	J2 League	6	0	0	0	6	0
Season	Bulgaria		League		Bulgarian Cup		Total	
2012–13	Beroe Stara Zagora	A PFG	9	0	2	2	10	2
Total			37	8	4	0	41	8
