= Eastern SC =

Eastern
- Full name: Eastern Sports Club Football Team Limited (東方體育會足球隊有限公司)
- Founded: 1932; 94 years ago
- Ground: Mong Kok Stadium
- Capacity: 6,664
- Head coach: André Jasmins
- League: Hong Kong Premier League
- 2025–26: Hong Kong Premier League, 4th of 10
- Website: easternsportsclub.com
| Home colours | Away colours |

Eastern Athletic Association Football Team Limited, also known as Eastern Sports Club (Chinese: 東方體育會), is a Hong Kong professional sports club whose football section competes in the Hong Kong Premier League, the top flight of Hong Kong football.

== History ==
=== Early history ===
In 1925, a group of workers from the China Building in Central formed the Chinese Football team. Two years later in 1927, the club changed its name to the Eastern Athletic Association, establishing itself as an all Chinese football club, and entered the Hong Kong Second Division.

During the 1931–32 season, Eastern initially won the right to promotion but declined. It was not until the 1936–37 season that the club would make its debut in the Hong Kong First Division, finishing 11th.

=== 1940–1990 ===
Eastern won its first trophy in club history in 1940, capturing the Senior Shield in a 2–1 victory over South China. Success was not permanent at Eastern who were relegated back to the Second Division not long after and did not return until the 1948–49 season.

The 1950s saw the first period of sustained success for Eastern. The club won the First Division for the first time in 1955–56 and captured two Senior Shields during this decade.

It was also during the 50s when Hong Kong football legend Lam Sheung Yee signed with Eastern and earned his debut in the First Division. Lam would go on to spend four separate spells at Eastern throughout his career although silverware eluded Lam during those years.

In the 1981–82 season the club was managed by former England captain and World Cup winner Bobby Moore. He helped them in winning the 1981–82 Hong Kong Senior Shield, later returned to the club as a manager in August 1982 before departing in March 1983.

Notable English players - such as 1966 World Cup winner Alan Ball and Graham Paddon - also played for the club in the early 80s.

Eastern's ability to attract such players was due to their large budget, funded by billionaire businessman Peter Lam. The strong squad were able to win two Senior Shields and a Hong Kong FA Cup in the 80s, however, they were never able to capture the First Division title.

=== Eastern Dynasty ===
Following the 1990–91 season, third placed club Lai Sun announced that they would be withdrawing from the First Division. This became the catalyst for Eastern's dynasty in the first half of the 90s as many former Lai Sun players found a home at Eastern.

Starting with a runners up finish in 1991–92, the club then dominated Hong Kong football, winning three consecutive First Division titles between 1992 and 1995. During the 1993–94 and 1994–95 seasons, the club won the treble, capturing all three major trophies in both seasons.

Unfortunately, due to a massive reduction in sponsorship revenue prior to the 1995–96 season, Eastern had to release many of their top players and were forced to sign younger, less experienced players. A year later, the club were relegated after a last place finish and returned to the Second Division for the first time since 1948.

=== Relegation and subsequent promotion ===
In the subsequent ten years following relegation in 1997, Eastern struggled in the league. The club finished at the bottom of the Second Division in 2002–03 and dropped down to the Third Division. They would eventually turn the tide by capturing the Third Division title in 2004–05 and returned to the second tier.

Ahead of the 2006–07 season, Eastern were to be demoted to Hong Kong Third Division but the Hong Kong Football Association intervened and invited the club to compete in First Division League for 2007–08 season.

It looked unlikely at first that for the club to obtain sufficient sponsorship to make the move up, however the club confirmed their participation in July 2007.

After competing in the top flight for two seasons, Eastern decided to drop into the Third Division ahead of the 2009–10 season due to financial difficulties.

After declining the right to promotion twice during their stay in the Third Division, the club finally accepted promotion during the 2011–12 season in which they won all 18 of their league matches and finished as champions.

During the 2012–13 season, Eastern was promoted back to the First Division League as the third-place finishers in the Second Division League. They were branded as Eastern Salon from 2012 to 2016 for sponsorship reasons.

In April 2016, Eastern won the 2015–16 Hong Kong Premier League under the guidance of Chan Yuen Ting, becoming the first men's professional association football team to win a domestic, top flight championship under the management of a woman. Eastern lost only one game in the 2015–16 season under Chan.

In the 2016–17 season, Eastern was branded as Eastern Long Lions for sponsorship reasons.

They beat Kitchee 3–1 to win the Hong Kong Community Cup. The club also reached the final of the Senior Shield before losing to Kitchee 2–1 at Hong Kong Stadium.

The club went on a season-long unbeaten run in the league until the final match day when they lost to Kitchee 4–1 at Mong Kok Stadium and finished runners up.

The season also marked the first time for a Hong Kong club to compete in the group stage of the AFC Champions League.

The club's only silverware of the season came from the league playoff, where they beat Southern 3–0 in the final to secure their spot in the second qualifying round of the AFC Champions League the next year.

=== AFC Champions League debut ===
Eastern were grouped with Japanese club Kawasaki Frontale, China club Guangzhou Evergrande and Korean club Suwon Samsung Bluewings.They finished the AFC Champions League campaign with one point in six matches, finishing in the bottom of their group.

Manolo Bleda scored the club only goal in the tournament and also gaining their first ever point in their debut tournament in a 1–1 draw against Kawasaki Frontale at the Mong Kok Stadium.

=== Recent times ===
In 2018, Eastern obtained the sponsorship of Top East Holdings, allowing the club to expand its budget.

The club launched a program known as Project E in which Eastern will send its most promising young players to train with Portuguese club Cova da Piedade.

Ahead of the 2019–20 season, Eastern lured reigning Coach of the Year Lee Chi Kin and many of his former players from Tai Po in hopes of returning the club to title contender status.

The club were successful in his first season, winning the Senior Shield-FA Cup double, and won the Sapling Cup in his second season. But the club failed to win the league in 2020–21. Lee stepped down as head coach following the season.

On 20 June 2024, AFC confirmed that Eastern will participate in the inaugural 2024–25 AFC Champions League Two.

== Name history ==
- 1932–2012: Eastern (東方)
- 2012–2016: Eastern Salon (東方沙龍)
- 2016–2023: Eastern Long Lions (東方龍獅)
- 2023–: Eastern (東方)

== Rivalries ==
During the 1960s and 70s, the majority of Eastern's funding came from pro-Taiwan backed groups while rivals Happy Valley received sponsorship from pro-China groups.

An intense rivalry developed between the clubs during this period and the media referred to the derbies between them as the "Chinese Civil War."

== Current squad ==
=== First team ===
As of 27 October 2026

Note: Flags indicate national team as defined under FIFA eligibility rules; some limited exceptions apply. Players may hold more than one non-FIFA nationality.

| No. | Pos. | Nation | Player |
|---|---|---|---|
| 1 | GK | HKG | Yapp Hung Fai (vice-captain) |
| 4 | DF | ESP | Alejandro Parada |
| 5 | DF | VEN | Alejandro Cova |
| 6 | MF | HKG | Law Chun Ting |
| 7 | FW | HKG | Naveed Khan |
| 8 | MF | ENG | Tashan Oakley-Boothe |
| 9 | FW | JPN | Yu Okubo |
| 11 | FW | BRA | Felipe Sá |
| 13 | GK | HKG | Chung Hoi Man |
| 14 | DF | HKG | Loong Tsz Hin |
| 15 | MF | HKG | Lau Kwan Ching |
| 16 | MF | HKG | Leung Chun Pong (captain) |
| 17 | MF | BRA | Gabriel Carvalho |
| 19 | FW | DOM | Nowend Lorenzo |
| 20 | DF | ESP | Carlos Alonso |
| 21 | FW | HKG | Lee Chun Ting |

| No. | Pos. | Nation | Player |
|---|---|---|---|
| 22 | DF | HKG | Leung Kwun Chung |
| 23 | MF | HKG | Lee Lok Him |
| 25 | GK | HKG | Ko Chun |
| 26 | GK | HKG | Yuen Ho Chun |
| 27 | MF | ESP | Marcos Gondra |
| 28 | MF | HKG | Siu Ching |
| 32 | MF | HKG | Lam Hin Ting |
| 33 | MF | HKG | Gao Ming Ho |
| 42 | MF | HKG | Yeung Tung Ki |
| 43 | DF | HKG | Uriel Contiero |
| 65 | MF | HKG | Wong Fred Yang |
| 66 | DF | HKG | Gao Ming Ngai |
| 77 | GK | HKG | Hung Hei Yin |
| 88 | MF | HKG | Cheung Man Ho |
| 99 | MF | HKG | Cheung Che Hope |

== Club official ==
| Position | Staff |
|---|---|
| Head coach | (Portugal) André Jasmins |
| Assistant coach | (Hong Kong) Cristiano Cordeiro |
| Assistant coach | (Portugal) Pedro Miranda |
| Assistant coach | (Hong Kong) Yeung Lok Man |
| Goalkeeping coach | (Brazil) Ricardo Navarro |
| Fitness coaching | (Hong Kong) Law Man Chung |
| Analyst | (Scotland) Edward Mangan |

== Honours ==
=== League ===
- Hong Kong Premier League
  - Champions (1): 2015–16
- Hong Kong First Division
  - Champions (4): 1955–56, 1992–93, 1993–94, 1994–95
- Hong Kong Second Division
  - Champions (1): 1947–48
- Hong Kong Third Division
  - Champions (3): 2004–05, 2009–10, 2010–11, 2011–12

=== Cup competitions ===
- Hong Kong Senior Shield
  - Champions (12): 1939–40, 1952–53, 1955–56, 1981–82, 1986–87, 1992–93, 1993–94, 2007–08, 2014–15, 2015–16, 2019–20, 2024–25
- Hong Kong FA Cup
  - Champions (7): 1983–84, 1992–93, 1993–94, 2013–14, 2019–20, 2023–24, 2024–25
- Hong Kong Sapling Cup
  - Champions (1): 2020–21
- Hong Kong Viceroy Cup
  - Champions (2): 1970–72, 1980–81
- Hong Kong Community Cup
  - Champions (1): 2016

== Season-to-season record ==
| Season | Tier | Division | Teams | Position | Home stadium | Attendance/G | FA Cup | Senior Shield | League Cup | Sapling Cup |
|---|---|---|---|---|---|---|---|---|---|---|
| 2005–06 | 2 | Second Division | 13 | 9 | | | Did not enter | Did not enter | Did not enter | Not held |
| 2006–07 | 2 | Second Division | 11 | 10 | | | Did not enter | Did not enter | Did not enter | Not held |
| 2007–08 | 1 | First Division | 10 | 7 | | | Semi-finals | Champions | Semi-finals | Not held |
| 2008–09 | 1 | First Division | 13 | 9 | | | First round | Quarter-finals | Semi-finals | Not held |
| 2009–10 | 3 | Third A Division | 20 | 1 | | | Did not enter | Did not enter | Not held | Not held |
| 2010–11 | 3 | Third A Division | 19 | 1 | | | Did not enter | Did not enter | Did not enter | Not held |
| 2011–12 | 3 | Third A Division | 19 | 1 | | | Did not enter | Did not enter | Did not enter | Not held |
| 2012–13 | 2 | Second Division | 11 | 3 | | | Did not enter | Did not enter | Not held | Not held |
| 2013–14 | 1 | First Division | 12 | 6 | Shing Mun Valley Sports Ground; Sham Shui Po Sports Ground; Mong Kok Stadium | 1,069 | Champions | Semi-finals | Not held | Not held |
| 2014–15 | 1 | Premier League | 9 | 2 | Tseung Kwan O Sports Ground | 960 | Runners-up | Champions | Knock-out stage | Not held |
| 2015–16 | 1 | Premier League | 9 | 1 | Mong Kok Stadium | 1,908 | Quarter-finals | Champions | Semi-finals | Semi-finals |
| 2016–17 | 1 | Premier League | 11 | 2 | Mong Kok Stadium | 1,923 | Semi-finals | Runners-up | Not held | Semi-finals |
| 2017–18 | 1 | Premier League | 10 | 4 | Mong Kok Stadium | 1,511 | Quarter-finals | Runners-up | Not held | Group stage |
| 2018–19 | 1 | Premier League | 10 | 5 | Hong Kong Stadium | 1,040 | First round | Semi-finals | Not held | Group stage |
| 2019–20 | 1 | Premier League | 10 | 2 | Tseung Kwan O Sports Ground | 803 | Champions | Champions | Not held | Group stage |
| 2020–21 | 1 | Premier League | 8 | 2 | Mong Kok Stadium | 1,162 | Cancelled due to COVID-19 pandemic | | Not held | Champions |
| 2021–22 | 1 | Premier League | 8 | Cancelled | Mong Kok Stadium | 1,053 | Cancelled due to COVID-19 pandemic | | Not held | Cancelled due to COVID-19 pandemic |
| 2022–23 | 1 | Premier League | 10 | 4 | Mong Kok Stadium | 1,043 | Semi-finals | Runners-up | Not held | Semi-finals |
| 2023–24 | 1 | Premier League | 11 | 3 | Mong Kok Stadium | 775 | Champions | Runners-up | Not held | Group stage |
| 2024–25 | 1 | Premier League | 9 | 3 | Mong Kok Stadium | 1,031 | Champions | Champions | Not held | Semi-finals |
| 2025–26 | 1 | Premier League | 10 | 4 | Mong Kok Stadium | 972 | Quarter-finals | Semi-finals | First round | Defunct |
| 2026–27 | 1 | Premier League | 11 | | Mong Kok Stadium | | | | | Defunct |

Note:

1st or Champions 2nd or Runners-up 3rd place Promotion Relegation

== Continental record ==
| Season | Competition | Round | Club | Home | Away | Aggregate |
|---|---|---|---|---|---|---|
| 1994 | Asian Club Championship | First round | (Japan) Verdy Kawasaki | 1–0 | 1–3 | 2–3 |
| 1995 | Asian Club Championship | First round | (Brunei) Kota Ranger | 6–1 | 6–1 | 12–2 |
| 1995 | Asian Club Championship | Second round | (Japan) Verdy Kawasaki | 1–2 | 3–4 | 4–6 |
| 2009 | AFC Cup | Group G | (Thailand) Chonburi FC | 2–1 | 1–4 | 3rd |
| 2009 | AFC Cup | Group G | (Vietnam) Hà Nội ACB | 3–0 | 0–3 | 3rd |
| 2009 | AFC Cup | Group G | (Malaysia) Kedah FA | 3–3 | 0–2 | 3rd |
| 2017 | AFC Champions League | Group G | (China) Guangzhou Evergrande | 0–6 | 0–7 | 4th |
| 2017 | AFC Champions League | Group G | (Japan) Kawasaki Frontale | 1–1 | 0–4 | 4th |
| 2017 | AFC Champions League | Group G | (South Korea) Suwon Samsung Bluewings | 0–1 | 0–5 | 4th |
| 2018 | AFC Champions League | Qualifying preliminary round 2 | (Vietnam) FLC Thanh Hóa | 2–4 | | |
| 2021 | AFC Cup | Group J | (Hong Kong) Lee Man | 0–1 | | 2nd |
| 2021 | AFC Cup | Group J | (Mongolia) Athletic 220 | 1–0 | | 2nd |
| 2021 | AFC Cup | Group J | (Chinese Taipei) Tainan City | 1–0 | | 2nd |
| 2022 | AFC Cup | Group J | (Hong Kong) Lee Man | 3–1 | | 1st |
| 2022 | AFC Cup | Group J | (Chinese Taipei) Tainan City | 3–1 | | 1st |
| 2022 | AFC Cup | Inter-zone play-off semi-finals | (Uzbekistan) Sogdiana Jizzakh | 0–1 | | |
| 2024–25 | AFC Champions League Two | Group E | (Japan) Sanfrecce Hiroshima | 2–3 | 1–4 | 4th |
| 2024–25 | AFC Champions League Two | Group E | (Australia) Sydney FC | 1–4 | 0–5 | 4th |
| 2024–25 | AFC Champions League Two | Group E | (Philippines) Kaya–Iloilo | 1–2 | 2–1 | 4th |
| 2025–26 | AFC Champions League Two | Group F | (Japan) Gamba Osaka | 0–5 | 1–3 | 4th |
| 2025–26 | AFC Champions League Two | Group F | (Vietnam) Nam Định | 0–1 | 0–9 | 4th |
| 2025–26 | AFC Champions League Two | Group F | (Thailand) Ratchaburi | 0–7 | 1–5 | 4th |

== Other achievements ==
=== 1992–93 season ===
In 1992–93 season, Eastern maintained a record of 9 straight wins in the first half of the First Division League season.

The team scored 30 goals in the first 9 matches with no goals conceded. It was a record of 3-zero (0 draw, 0 loss, 0 conceded).

Eastern captured 3 trophies in that season, and regained the League Champion title after 37 years.

=== AFC Champions League ===
Eastern is the first Hong Kong club to compete in the group stage of the AFC Champions League.

Chan Yuen-ting is the first woman to coach a male football club in a top-flight continental competition, when she managed the club in the 2017 AFC Champions League match against Chinese side Guangzhou Evergrande.

== Head coaches ==
- (England) Bobby Moore (卜比·摩亞) (1981–1982)
- (Hong Kong) Peter Wong (黃興桂) (1979–1982, 1988–1990)
- (Hong Kong) Tsang Wai Chung (曾偉忠) (1996–1998)
- (Brazil) Casemiro Mior (米路) (2007–2008)
- (Hong Kong) Chan Hiu Ming (陳曉明), Lee Kin Wo (李健和), Lo Kai Wah (羅繼華) (2008–2009)
- (Hong Kong) Lee Kin Wo (李健和) (2009–2013)
- (Hong Kong) Cristiano Cordeiro (高尼路) (2013–2015)
- (Hong Kong) Yeung Ching Kwong (楊正光) (2015)
- (Hong Kong) Chan Yuen Ting (陳婉婷) (2015–2017)
- (Hong Kong) Szeto Man Chun (司徒文俊) (2017–2018)
- (Hong Kong) Lee Kin Wo (李健和) (caretaker) (2018)
- (Hong Kong) Chan Yuen Ting (陳婉婷) (2018–2019)
- (Hong Kong) Wong Chun Yue (黃鎮宇) (caretaker) (2019)
- (Latvia) Andrejs Štolcers (安祖史杜錫) (caretaker) (2019)
- (Hong Kong) Lee Chi Kin (李志堅) (2019–2021)
- (Hong Kong) Roberto Losada (盧比度) (2021–2025)
- (Hong Kong) Cristiano Cordeiro (高尼路) (caretaker) (2025–2026)
- (Spain) Manuel Torres (文努托利斯) (2026)
- (Hong Kong) Cristiano Cordeiro (高尼路) (caretaker) (2026)
- (Portugal) André Jasmins (謝明斯) (2026–present)
