= Óscar Rodríguez (footballer, born 1980) =

Spanish footballer

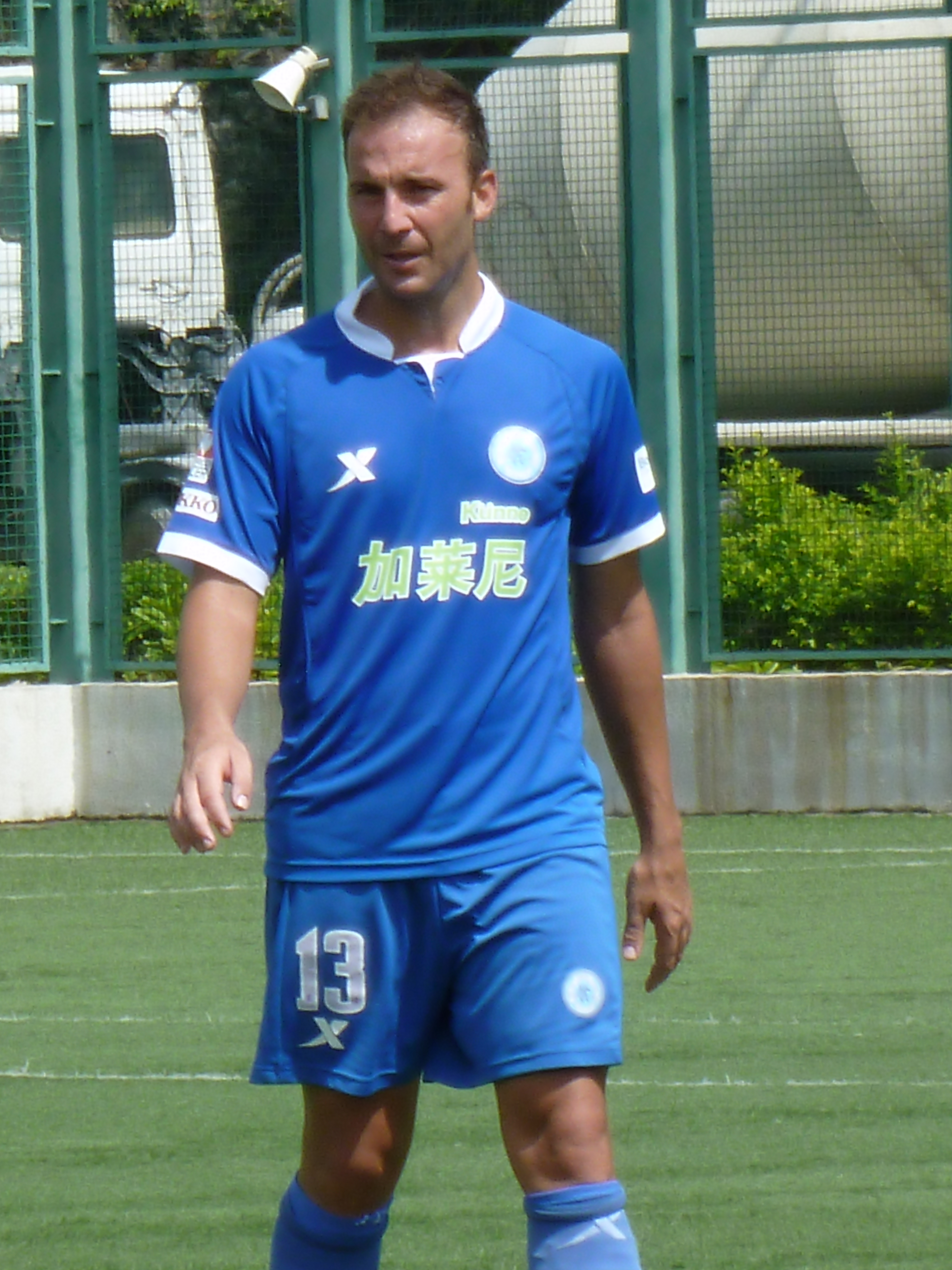

Personal information
- Full name: Óscar Rodríguez Antequera
- Date of birth: 17 April 1980 (age 46)
- Place of birth: Seville, Spain
- Height: 1.84 m (6 ft 0 in)
- Position: Centre back

Youth career
- Sevilla

Senior career*
Years	Team	Apps	(Gls)
1999–2002	Sevilla B	52	(1)
2002–2005	Sevilla	25	(0)
2004	→ Valladolid (loan)	5	(0)
2005–2006	Poli Ejido	7	(0)
2006–2007	Cartagena	15	(0)
2007–2008	Portuense	33	(0)
2008–2013	Écija	143	(7)
2013–2014	Paniliakos	1	(0)
2014–2015	Hong Kong Rangers	12	(1)
- * Club domestic league appearances and goals as of 00:00, 14 September 2015 (UTC)

Óscar Rodríguez Antequera (born 17 April 1980) is a Spanish former professional footballer who played as a central defender.

== Club career ==
=== Spain ===
Born in Seville, Andalusia, Rodríguez graduated from local Sevilla FC's youth system, making his senior debut with the B-team in 1999. His first appearance in La Liga occurred on 1 September 2002, as he played the full 90 minutes in a 0–1 home loss against RC Celta de Vigo; 17 of his league games for the main squad took place during that season, with the team eventually ranking in tenth position.

From August–December 2004, Rodríguez was loaned to Real Valladolid of Segunda División. Released by his parent club in June of the following year, he resumed his career with another side in the second tier, Polideportivo Ejido, then moved to the lower leagues with FC Cartagena.

Rodríguez signed for Écija Balompié in the summer of 2008, being eventually named team captain and renewing his contract for a further two years on 15 July 2011. On 18 July 2014, he announced his intentions to leave.

=== Abroad ===
On 8 September 2013, after claiming he had received offers from clubs in Thailand and Italy, the 33-year-old Rodríguez signed for Paniliakos F.C. in the Football League (Greece). The following year he switched teams and countries, joining Hong Kong Premier League's Hong Kong Rangers FC.
