= Blake Garden AA =

Blake Garden
- Full name: Hong Kong Blake Garden AA Limited
- Founded: 1971
- President: Yeung Tsz Man
- League: Hong Kong Fourth Division League
- 2011–12: Third Division "A", 17th (relegated)
Home colours	Away colours

Hong Kong Blake Garden AA Ltd. (Chinese: 卜公體育會, also known as HK Blake Garden AA or simply Blake Garden), is a football club in Hong Kong. In 2011 played in the Hong Kong Third A Division League. It was formed by a group of football fans in Blake Garden, Hong Kong. It had competed in the Hong Kong First Division League.

== History ==
In the 1970s, Blake Garden attracted lovers of football. A group of teenagers formed a team called Blake Garden. The team registered as a member of HKFA, and competed in Hong Kong Third Division League.

In the 1975–76 season, Blake Garden, as a team competing in Hong Kong Third Division League, reached the final of Hong Kong Junior Challenge Shield. Blake Garden defeated Hong Kong Second Division League club Jardine SA with a penalty goal and advanced to the Hong Kong Second Division League.

In the 1976–77 season, Blake Garden placed 2nd in the Second Division League, and promoted to the Hong Kong First Division League for the first time.

In the 1977–78 season, Blake Garden reached the final of the Hong Kong FA Cup, losing to Seiko SA.

In the 1978–79 season, during the match against Yuen Long District SA on 11 March 1978, players got in a fight. Blake Garden placed last that season and was relegated to the Second Division.
