= Hong Kong Junior Shield =

Hong Kong Junior Challenge Shield
- Founded: 1922
- Abolished: 2013
- Region: Hong Kong
- Number of teams: 40
- Most successful club(s): South China (9 times)

Hong Kong Junior Shield (Chinese: 香港初級組銀牌) was a football competition in Hong Kong established in 1922. All teams in the Second Division and the Third Division were included in the competition.

South China was the most successful club, winning 9 titles.

== History ==
Hong Kong Junior Challenge Shield was founded by the Hong Kong Football Association in 1922. The first champion was King's Own Rifles. Athletic, champions of 1927–28, were the first Chinese team to win the Junior Challenge Shield.

The Junior Shield was replaced by the Hong Kong FA Cup Junior Division after the 2012–13 season, designed to allow lower division clubs to qualify for the tournament proper.

== Champions ==
No.	Season	Winner	Scorers	Score	Runner–up	Scorers	Venues
1	1922–23	King's Own Rifles					
2	1923–24	HMS 'Danae'					
3	1924–25	East Surrey Regiment					
4	1925–26	East Surrey Regiment					
5	1926–27	New King's Own Rifles					
6	1927–28	Athletic					
7	1928–29	New King's Own Rifles					
8	1929–30	Athletic B					
9	1930–31	Royal Navy					
10	1931–32	炮兵(十二營)					
11	1932–33	Royal Navy					
12	1933–34	Royal Navy					
13	1934–35	Royal Engineers					
14	1935–36	Royal Engineers					
15	1936–37	Royal Engineers					
16	1937–38	Kwong Wah					
17	1938–39	蘇皇軍					
18	1939–40	三十營炮兵					
19	1940–41	軍糧					
	1945–46	Did not play					
20	1946–47	Royal Navy					
21	1947–48	South China					
22	1948–49	Kowloon Motor Bus					
23	1949–50	Army					
24	1950–51	South China					
25	1951–52	Kitchee					
26	1952–53	South China					
27	1953–54	South China					
28	1954–55	South China					
29	1955–56	Kowloon Motor Bus					
30	1956–57	South China					
31	1957–58	South China					
32	1958–59	South China					
33	1959–60	Kowloon Motor Bus					
34	1960–61	Happy Valley					
35	1961–62	Tung Sing					
36	1962–63	Army					
37	1963–64	Kowloon Motor Bus					
38	1964–65	Rangers					
39	1965–66	Army					
40	1966–67	South China					
41	1967–68	Jardines					
42	1968–69	Fire Services					
43	1969–70	Happy Valley					
44	1970–71	Jardines					
45	1971–72	Police					
46	1972–73	Jardines					
47	1973–74	Jardines					
48	1974–75	Police					
49	1975–76	Blake Garden					
50	1976–77	HKFC					
51	1977–78	Kui Tan					
52	1978–79	HKFC					
53	1979–80	Tsuen Wan					
54	1980–81	Rangers					
55	1981–82	Ryoden					
56	1982–83	Harps					
57	1983–84	Sing Tao					
58	1984–85	Hongkong Electric					
59	1985–86	Blake Garden					
60	1986–87	Sing Tao					
61	1987–88	Martini					
62	1988–89	Young Hong Kong					
63	1989–90	Fukien					
64	1990–91	Police					
65	1991–92	Rangers					
66	1992–93	HKFC					
67	1993–94	Frankwell					
68	1994–95	HKFC					
69	1995–96	Yee Hope					
70	1996–97	HKFC					
71	1997–98	Sai Kung Friends					
72	1998–99	Kitchee					
73	1999–00	Tung Po					
74	2000–01	Fukien					
75	2001–02	Mutual					
76	2002–03	Fire Services					
77	2003–04	Tung Po					
78	2004–05	HKFC					
79	2005–06	Tung Po	Lo Chi Fung (85 pen.)	1–1 (4–2 PSO)	HKFC	Anto Grabo (68)	Mong Kok Stadium
80	2006–07	Fukien	Cheung Wai Shing (48)	1–0	Double Flower	–	Sham Shui Po Sports Ground
81	2007–08	Shatin	Ching Ho Yin (13, 82); Li Ka Wing (32); Kwok Yue Hung (90 pen.)	4–0	Mutual	–	Siu Sai Wan Sports Ground
82	2008–09	Shatin	Lawrence Akandu (51); Ching Ho Yin (90+)	2–0	Sham Shui Po	–	Sha Tin Sports Ground
	2009–10	Not held					
83	2010–11	Southern	Tai Man Shing (18); Ha Shing Chi (63)	2–1	Advance Double Flower	Tita Chou (33)	Hong Kong Stadium
84	2011–12	Wanchai	Lo Chun Kit (36); Kenji Treschuk (43); Wong Kwok Pun (80)	3–0	Happy Valley		Hong Kong Stadium
85	2012–13	Yuen Long	Fábio Lopes (4, 56, 80); Yu Ho Pong (19, 87); Hon Shing (35)	6–2	Kwai Tsing	Lai Kwok Kwan (12); Wong Sheung Choi (70)	Hong Kong Stadium

== See also ==
- Hong Kong Senior Shield
- Hong Kong FA Cup preliminary round
