= 2013–14 Hong Kong Third Division League =

Hong Kong Third Division League
- Season: 2013–14
- Matches: 83
- Goals: 323 (3.89 per match)
- Biggest home win: Week 1 Metro Gallery Sun Source 8–0 Fu Moon; Week 6 Eastern District 8–0 Fu Moon
- Biggest away win: Week 10; Fire Services 1–8 Sham Shui Po
- Highest scoring: Week 8 Yau Tsim Mong 7–2 Fu Moon; Week 10; Fire Services 1–8 Sham Shui Po
- Longest winning run: 6 games Yau Tsim Mong
- Longest unbeaten run: 12 games Yau Tsim Mong
- Longest winless run: 12 games Fu Moon
- Longest losing run: 6 games Kowloon City

The 2013–14 Hong Kong Third Division League is the 63rd season of Hong Kong Third Division League, the third-tier football league in Hong Kong organised by the Hong Kong Football Association.

The season began 8 September 2013 and ended on 27 April 2014.

== Teams ==
=== Changes from last season ===
==== From Third Division League ====
Promoted to Second Division League

- Wong Tai Sin
- Lucky Mile
- Kwun Tong
- Kwai Tsing

Relegated to Fourth Division League

- Fukien

==== To Third Division League ====
Relegated from Second Division League

- Sham Shui Po

Promoted from Fourth Division League

- Yau Tsim Mong
- Mutual
- Kwong Wah
- Sun Source

=== Team review ===
The 2013–14 season of the Hong Kong Third Division League consists of 14 clubs, including 9 sides from the 2012–13 season, 1 team relegated from 2012–13 Second Division and 4 teams promoted from 2012–13 Fourth Division.

The detail of the clubs is as follows.

Club	Position in 2012–13	Member since season	Consecutive season in league
Eastern District	9th	2012–13	2
Eastern Salon Original	5th	2012–13	2
Fire Services	6th	2012–13	2
Fu Moon	8th	2012–13	2
KCDRSC	10th	2012–13	2
Kowloon City	11th	2012–13	2
Kwong Wah	3rd in Fourth Division	2013–14	1
Metro Gallery Sun Source	4th in Fourth Division	2013–14	1
Mutual	2nd in Fourth Division	2013–14	1
On Good	12th	2012–13	2
Sham Shui Po	11th in Second Division	2013–14	1
Telecom	13th	2012–13	2
Tsuen Wan	7th	2012–13	2
Yau Tsim Mong	1st in Fourth Division	2013–14	1

== League table ==
Pos	Team	Pld	W	D	L	GF	GA	GD	Pts	Promotion or relegation
1	Metro Gallery Sun Source	26	23	1	2	113	30	+83	70	Promotion to First Division
2	Yau Tsim Mong	26	22	3	1	82	20	+62	69	Promotion to First Division
3	Mutual	26	16	5	5	61	30	+31	53	
4	Eastern Salon Original	26	15	0	11	77	53	+24	45	
5	Sham Shui Po	26	13	6	7	69	44	+25	45	
6	Eastern District	26	13	1	12	62	46	+16	40	
7	Kwong Wah	26	10	3	13	37	43	−6	33	
8	On Good	26	10	3	13	42	48	−6	33	
9	Tsuen Wan	26	7	8	11	38	46	−8	29	
10	Fire Services	26	7	8	11	32	51	−19	29	
11	Kowloon City	26	8	3	15	40	54	−14	27	
12	KCDRSC	26	7	4	15	34	70	−36	25	Relegation to Third Division
13	Telecom	26	4	4	18	31	64	−33	16	Relegation to Third Division
14	Fu Moon	25	0	4	21	16	135	−119	4	Relegation to Third Division

Updated to match(es) played on 27 April 2014. Source: Hong Kong Football Association
Rules for classification: 1) points; 2) head-to-head points; 3) head-to-head goal difference; 4) head-to-head goals scored; 5) goal difference; 6) number of goals scored.

=== Positions by round ===
To preserve the chronological order of events, any postponed matches are not included to the round at which they were originally scheduled, but added to the full round they were played immediately afterwards. For example, if a match is scheduled for round 7, but then played between rounds 8 and 9, it will be added to the standings for round 8.

Team ╲ Round	1	2	3	4	5	6	7	8	9	10	11	12	13	14	15	16	17	18	19	20	21	22	23	24	25	26
Eastern District	2	4	4	5	5	8	8	7	5	4	3	4														
Eastern Salon Original	12	8	8	8	8	10	12	12	9	7	7	8														
Fire Services	7	9	9	9	9	6	6	6	7	8	8	10														
Fu Moon	14	10	10	13	13	13	13	13	13	14	14	14														
KCDRSC	6	3	3	3	3	4	4	5	6	6	6	6														
Kowloon City	13	14	14	14	14	14	14	14	14	13	12	12														
Kwong Wah	5	7	7	7	7	9	7	8	8	9	9	7														
Metro Gallery Sun Source	1	1	1	1	1	2	2	2	2	2	2	2														
Mutual	8	6	6	4	4	5	5	4	3	5	4	3														
On Good	11	12	12	11	11	7	9	9	10	10	10	11														
Sham Shui Po	4	5	5	6	6	3	3	3	4	3	5	5														
Telecom	10	11	11	12	12	12	11	11	12	12	13	13														
Tsuen Wan	9	13	13	10	10	11	10	10	11	11	11	9														
Yau Tsim Mong	3	2	2	2	2	1	1	1	1	1	1	1														

Leader; Promotion to 2014–15 Hong Kong First Division League
Relegation to 2014–15 Hong Kong Third Division League

Updated to match(es) played on 24 November 2013. Source:

== Results ==
Home \ Away	EDS	ESO	FIR	FUM	KCD	KLC	KWW	MGS	MUT	OGD	SSP	TEL	TWF	YTM
Eastern District			1–0	8–0				2–3		2–3			3–2	1–2
Eastern Salon Original	1–2					4–0			1–5		1–5	6–0		1–5
Fire Services					1–0	2–0		1–3		2–2	1–8			
Fu Moon		1–4	2–2			1–7	0–0				2–5		1–5	
KCDRSC		4–2		0–0		2–1	2–1	1–7					2–1	
Kowloon City	1–7								2–1	0–1	0–0	4–3		1–5
Kwong Wah	0–1	2–3	2–0						2–1		2–3			
Metro Gallery Sun Source		5–3		8–0		3–0	5–3				1–1		5–1	
Mutual	2–0		1–1		6–1			1–4		2–0		2–1		0–0
On Good		0–1		3–0	2–1		0–3	0–3					1–2	
Sham Shui Po	2–2				1–1				0–1	1–0		5–2		2–5
Telecom	1–0		1–1	0–0	2–3					3–0				
Tsuen Wan		2–1	2–2			1–0	1–2		0–0			0–0		0–3
Yau Tsim Mong			3–1	7–2	3–2		3–0	3–1					6–0	

Updated to match(es) played on 1 December 2013. Source:
Legend: Blue = home team win; Yellow = draw; Red = away team win.

== Fixtures and results ==
=== Round 1 ===
8 September 2013	Metro Gallery Sun Source	8–0	Fu Moon	Causeway Bay, Hong Kong Island
13:30 UTC+8		Report		Stadium: Causeway Bay Sports Ground

8 September 2013	KCDRSC	2–1	Tsuen Wan	Happy Valley, Hong Kong Island
13:30 UTC+8		Report		Stadium: Happy Valley Recreation Ground #6

8 September 2013	Kowloon City	1–7	Eastern District	Kowloon City, Kowloon
13:30 UTC+8		Report		Stadium: Kowloon Tsai Park #1

8 September 2013	Eastern Salon Original	1–5	Yau Tsim Mong	Causeway Bay, Hong Kong Island
15:30 UTC+8		Report		Stadium: Causeway Bay Sports Ground

8 September 2013	Mutual	1–1	Fire Services	Happy Valley, Hong Kong Island
15:30 UTC+8		Report		Stadium: Happy Valley Recreation Ground #6

8 September 2013	Sham Shui Po	5–2	Telecom	Kowloon City, Kowloon
15:30 UTC+8		Report		Stadium: Kowloon Tsai Park #1

8 September 2013	On Good	0–3	Kwong Wah	Kwai Tsing, New Territories
15:30 UTC+8		Report		Stadium: Kwai Chung Sports Ground

=== Round 2 ===
15 September 2013	Fu Moon	2–2	Fire Services	Happy Valley, Hong Kong Island
13:30 UTC+8		Report		Stadium: Happy Valley Recreation Ground #6

15 September 2013	Metro Gallery Sun Source	5–1	Tsuen Wan	Kowloon City, Kowloon
13:30 UTC+8		Report		Stadium: Kowloon Tsai Park #1

15 September 2013	KCDRSC	2–1	Kwong Wah	Kowloon City, Kowloon
13:30 UTC+8		Report		Stadium: Kowloon Tsai Sports Ground

15 September 2013	Mutual	2–1	Telecom	Tai Po, New Territories
13:30 UTC+8		Report		Stadium: Kwong Fuk Park

15 September 2013	Sham Shui Po	2–2	Eastern District	Kowloon City, Kowloon
15:30 UTC+8		Report		Stadium: Kowloon Tsai Park #1

15 September 2013	Kowloon City	1–5	Yau Tsim Mong	Kowloon City, Kowloon
15:30 UTC+8		Report		Stadium: Kowloon Tsai Sports Ground

15 September 2013	On Good	0–1	Eastern Salon Original	Tai Po, New Territories
15:30 UTC+8		Report		Stadium: Kwong Fuk Park

=== Round 3 ===
12 January 2014 Postponed	Telecom	v	Metro Gallery Sun Source	Tai Po, New Territories
13:30 UTC+8				Stadium: Kwong Fuk Park

12 January 2014 Postponed	Fu Moon	v	Mutual	Sham Shui Po, Kowloon
13:30 UTC+8				Stadium: Tai Hang Tung #2

12 January 2014 Postponed	Fire Services	v	Eastern Salon Original	Kowloon City, Kowloon
13:30 UTC+8				Stadium: Kowloon Tsai Park #1

12 January 2014 Postponed	Eastern District	v	KCDRSC	Happy Valley, Hong Kong Island
15:30 UTC+8				Stadium: Happy Valley Recreation Ground #6

12 January 2014 Postponed	Kwong Wah	v	Kowloon City	Tai Po, New Territories
15:30 UTC+8				Stadium: Kwong Fuk Park

12 January 2014 Postponed	Yau Tsim Mong	v	On Good	Sham Shui Po, Kowloon
15:30 UTC+8				Stadium: Tai Hang Tung #2

12 January 2014 Postponed	Tsuen Wan	v	Sham Shui Po	Kowloon City, Kowloon
15:30 UTC+8				Stadium: Kowloon Tsai Park #1

Remark: Week 3 matches are cancelled and postponed due to typhoon. Matches will be rescheduled soon.

=== Round 4 ===
29 September 2013	Telecom	1–1	Fire Services	Happy Valley, Hong Kong Island
13:30 UTC+8		Report		Stadium: Happy Valley Recreation Ground #6

29 September 2013	Kowloon City	0–1	On Good	Kowloon City, Kowloon
13:30 UTC+8		Report		Stadium: Kowloon Tsai Park #1

29 September 2013	Mutual	2–0	Eastern District	Ma On Shan, New Territories
13:30 UTC+8		Report		Stadium: Ma On Shan Recreation Ground

29 September 2013	KCDRSC	4–2	Eastern Salon Original	Wong Tai Sin, Kowloon
13:30 UTC+8		Report		Stadium: Po Kong Village Road Park #2

29 September 2013	Fu Moon	1–5	Tsuen Wan	Happy Valley, Hong Kong Island
15:30 UTC+8		Report		Stadium: Happy Valley Recreation Ground #6

29 September 2013	Sham Shui Po	2–5	Yau Tsim Mong	Kowloon City, Kowloon
15:30 UTC+8		Report		Stadium: Kowloon Tsai Park #1

29 September 2013	Metro Gallery Sun Source	5–3	Kwong Wah	Wong Tai Sin, Kowloon
15:30 UTC+8		Report		Stadium: Po Kong Village Road Park #2

=== Round 5 ===
6 October 2013	Fire Services	2–2	Kwok Keung	Kowloon City, Kowloon
13:30 UTC+8		Report		Stadium: Kowloon Tsai Park #1

6 October 2013	Tsuen Wan	0–0	Mutual	Kwai Tsing, New Territories
13:30 UTC+8		Report		Stadium: Kwai Chung Sports Ground

6 October 2013	Telecom	0–0	Fu Moon	Ma On Shan, New Territories
13:30 UTC+8		Report		Stadium: Ma On Shan Recreation Ground

6 October 2013	Eastern Salon Original	4–0	Kowloon City	Sheung Shui, New Territories
13:30 UTC+8		Report		Stadium: North District Sports Ground

6 October 2013	Eastern District	2–3	Metro Gallery Sun Source	Causeway Bay, Hong Kong Island
15:30 UTC+8		Report		Stadium: Causeway Bay Sports Ground

6 October 2013	Yau Tsim Mong	3–2	KCDRSC	Kowloon City, Kowloon
15:30 UTC+8		Report		Stadium: Kowloon Tsai Park #1

6 October 2013	Kwong Wah	2–3	Sham Shui Po	Kwai Tsing, New Territories
15:30 UTC+8		Report		Stadium: Kwai Chung Sports Ground

=== Round 6 ===
13 October 2013	Eastern District	8–0	Fu Moon	Causeway Bay, Hong Kong Island
13:30 UTC+8		Report		Stadium: Causeway Bay Sports Ground

13 October 2013	Yau Tsim Mong	3–1	Metro Gallery Sun Source	Kowloon City, Kowloon
13:30 UTC+8		Report		Stadium: Kowloon Tsai Park #1

13 October 2013	Eastern Salon Original	1–5	Sham Shui Po	Tai Po, New Territories
13:30 UTC+8		Report		Stadium: Kwong Fuk Park

13 October 2013	Fire Services	2–0	Kowloon City	Ma On Shan, New Territories
13:30 UTC+8		Report		Stadium: Ma On Shan Recreation Ground

13 October 2013	On Good	2–1	KCDRSC	Wong Tai Sin, Kowloon
13:30 UTC+8		Report		Stadium: Po Kong Village Road Park #1

13 October 2013	Tsuen Wan	0–0	Telecom	Tsing Yi, New Territories
13:30 UTC+8		Report		Stadium: Tsing Yi Northeast Park

13 October 2013	Kwong Wah	2–1	Mutual	Causeway Bay, Hong Kong Island
15:30 UTC+8		Report		Stadium: Causeway Bay Sports Ground

=== Round 7 ===
20 October 2013	Fu Moon	0–0	Kwong Wah	Kowloon City, New Territories
13:30 UTC+8		Report		Stadium: Kowloon Tsai Park #1

20 October 2013	Metro Gallery Sun Source	5–3	Eastern Salon Original	Ma On Shan, New Territories
13:30 UTC+8		Report		Stadium: Ma On Shan Recreation Ground

20 October 2013	Sham Shui Po	1–0	On Good	Kowloon City, New Territories
15:30 UTC+8		Report		Stadium: Kowloon Tsai Park #1

20 October 2013	KCDRSC	2–1	Kowloon City	Kowloon City, New Territories
15:30 UTC+8		Report		Stadium: Kowloon Tsai Sports Ground

20 October 2013	Telecom	1–0	Eastern District	Sham Shui Po, Kowloon
15:30 UTC+8		Report		Stadium: Tai Hung Tung #2

20 October 2013	Mutual	0–0	Yau Tsim Mong	Tsing Yi, New Territories
18:30 UTC+8		Report		Stadium: Tsing Yi Northeast Park

20 October 2013	Tsuen Wan	2–2	Fire Services	Tsing Yi, New Territories
20:30 UTC+8		Report		Stadium: Tsing Yi Northeast Park

=== Round 8 ===
27 October 2013	Fire Services	1–0	KCDRSC	Happy Valley, Hong Kong Island
13:30 UTC+8		Report		Stadium: Happy Valley #6

27 October 2013	Yau Tsim Mong	7–2	Fu Moon	Kowloon City, Kowloon
13:30 UTC+8		Report		Stadium: Kowloon Tsai Park #1

27 October 2013	Eastern Salon Original	1–5	Mutual	Tsing Yi, New Territories
13:30 UTC+8		Report		Stadium: Tsing Yi Northeast Park

27 October 2013	Eastern District	3–2	Tsuen Wan	Happy Valley, Hong Kong Island
15:30 UTC+8		Report		Stadium: Happy Valley #6

27 October 2013	Kowloon City	0–0	Sham Shui Po	Kowloon City, Kowloon
15:30 UTC+8		Report		Stadium: Kowloon Tsai Recreation Ground

27 October 2013	On Good	0–3	Metro Gallery Sun Source	Shun Shui Po, Kowloon
15:30 UTC+8		Report		Stadium: Tai Hang Tung #2

5 January 2014 Postponed	Kwong Wah	v	Telecom	Kowloon City, Kowloon
15:30 UTC+8				Stadium: Kowloon Tsai Park #1

=== Round 9 ===
3 November 2013	Fu Moon	1–4	Eastern Salon Original	Causeway Bay, Hong Kong Island
13:30 UTC+8		Report		Stadium: Causeway Bay Sports Ground

3 November 2013	Telecom	0–3	Yau Tsim Mong	Kowloon City, Kowloon
13:30 UTC+8		Report		Stadium: Kowloon Tsai Sports Ground

3 November 2013	Tsuen Wan	1–2	Kwong Wah	Tsing Yi, New Territories
13:30 UTC+8		Report		Stadium: Tsing Yi Northeast Park

3 November 2013	Eastern District	1–0	Fire Services	Causeway Bay, Hong Kong Island
15:30 UTC+8		Report		Stadium: Causeway Bay Sports Ground

3 November 2013	Sham Shui Po	1–1	KCDRSC	Kowloon City, Kowloon
15:30 UTC+8		Report		Stadium: Kowloon Tsai Sports Ground

3 November 2013	Metro Gallery Sun Source	3–0	Kowloon City	Sham Shui Po, Kowloon
15:30 UTC+8		Report		Stadium: Tai Hang Tung #2

3 November 2013	Mutual	2–0	On Good	Tsing Yi, New Territories
15:30 UTC+8		Report		Stadium: Tsing Yi Northeast Park

=== Round 10 ===
10 November 2013	Eastern Salon Original	6–0	Telecom	Happy Valley, Hong Kong
13:30 UTC+8		Report		Stadium: Happy Valley #6

10 November 2013	KCDRSC	1–7	Metro Gallery Sun Source	Kowloon City, Kowloon
13:30 UTC+8		Report		Stadium: Kowloon Tsai Park #1

10 November 2013	Yau Tsim Mong	6–0	Tsuen Wan	Wong Tai Sin, Kowloon
13:30 UTC+8		Report		Stadium: Po Kong Village Road Park #1

10 November 2013	On Good	3–0	Fu Moon	Wong Tai Sin, Kowloon
13:30 UTC+8		Report		Stadium: Po Kong Village Road Park #2

10 November 2013	Fire Services	1–8	Sham Shui Po	Happy Valley, Hong Kong
15:30 UTC+8		Report		Stadium: Happy Valley #6

10 November 2013	Kowloon City	2–1	Mutual	Kowloon City, Kowloon
15:30 UTC+8		Report		Stadium: Kowloon Tsai Park #1

10 November 2013	Kwong Wah	0–1	Eastern District	Wong Tai Sin, Kowloon
15:30 UTC+8		Report		Stadium: Po Kong Village Road Park #2

=== Round 11 ===
17 November 2013	KCDRSC	0–0	Fu Moon	Kowloon City, Kowloon
13:30 UTC+8		Report		Stadium: Kowloon Tsai Park #1

17 November 2013	On Good	1–2	Tsuen Wan	Wong Tai Sin, Kowloon
13:30 UTC+8		Report		Stadium: Po Kong Village Road Park #1

17 November 2013	Eastern Salon Original	1–2	Eastern District	Wong Tai Sin, Kowloon
13:30 UTC+8		Report		Stadium: Po Kong Village Road Park #2

17 November 2013	Fire Services	1–3	Metro Gallery Sun Source	Happy Valley, Hong Kong
15:30 UTC+8		Report		Stadium: Happy Valley Recreation Ground #6

17 November 2013	Kowloon City	4–3	Telecom	Kowloon City, Kowloon
15:30 UTC+8		Report		Stadium: Kowloon Tsai Park #1

17 November 2013	Sham Shui Po	0–1	Mutual	Wong Tai Sin, Kowloon
15:30 UTC+8		Report		Stadium: Po Kong Village Road Park #1

17 November 2013	Yau Tsim Mong	3–0	Kwong Wah	Wong Tai Sin, Kowloon
15:30 UTC+8		Report		Stadium: Po Kong Village Road Park #2

=== Round 12 ===
24 November 2013	Fu Moon	1–7	Kowloon City	Happy Valley, Hong Kong Island
13:30 UTC+8		Report		Stadium: Happy Valley Recreation Ground #6

24 November 2013	Metro Gallery Sun Source	1–1	Sham Shui Po	Ma On Shan, New Territories
13:30 UTC+8		Report		Stadium: Ma On Shan Recreation Ground

24 November 2013	Mutual	6–1	KCDRSC	Wong Tai Sin, Kowloon
13:30 UTC+8		Report		Stadium: Po Kong Village Road Park #2

24 November 2013	Telecom	3–0	On Good	Tsuen Wan, New Territories
13:30 UTC+8		Report		Stadium: Tsuen Wan Riviera Park

24 November 2013	Eastern District	1–2	Yau Tsim Mong	Happy Valley, Hong Kong Island
15:30 UTC+8		Report		Stadium: Happy Valley Recreation Ground #6

24 November 2013	Kwong Wah	2–0	Fire Services	Wong Tai Sin, Kowloon
15:30 UTC+8		Report		Stadium: Po Kong Village Road Park #2

24 November 2013	Tsuen Wan	2–1	Eastern Salon Original	Tsuen Wan, New Territories
15:30 UTC+8		Report		Stadium: Tsuen Wan Riviera Park

=== Round 13 ===
1 December 2013	Eastern District	2–3	On Good	Causeway Bay, Hong Kong Island
13:30 UTC+8		Report		Stadium: Causeway Bay Sports Ground

1 December 2013	Yau Tsim Mong	3–1	Fire Services	Kowloon City, Kowloon
13:30 UTC+8		Report		Stadium: Kowloon Tsai Park #1

1 December 2013	Mutual	1–4	Metro Gallery Sun Source	Tai Po, New Territories
13:30 UTC+8		Report		Stadium: Kwong Fuk Park

1 December 2013	Fu Moon	2–5	Sham Shui Po	Causeway Bay, Hong Kong Island
15:30 UTC+8		Report		Stadium: Causeway Bay Sports Ground

1 December 2013	Kwong Wah	2–3	Eastern Salon Original	Kowloon City, Kowloon
15:30 UTC+8		Report		Stadium: Kowloon Tsai Park #1

1 December 2013	Telecom	2–3	KCDRSC	Kowloon City, Kowloon
15:30 UTC+8		Report		Stadium: Kowloon Tsai Sports Ground

1 December 2013	Tsuen Wan	1–0	Kowloon City	Tsuen Wan, New Territories
15:30 UTC+8		Report		Stadium: Tsuen Wan Riviera Park

=== Round 14 ===
19 January 2014	Eastern District	v	Kowloon City	Happy Valley, Hong Kong Island
13:30 UTC+8				Stadium: Happy Valley Recreation Ground #6

19 January 2014	Telecom	v	Sham Shui Po	Wong Tai Sin, Kowloon
13:30 UTC+8				Stadium: Hammer Hill Recreation Ground

19 January 2014	Tsuen Wan	v	KCDRSC	Tuen Mun, New Territories
13:30 UTC+8				Stadium: Wu Shan Recreation Ground

19 January 2014	Yau Tsim Mong	v	Eastern Salon Original	Wong Tai Sin, Kowloon
15:30 UTC+8				Stadium: Hammer Hill Recreation Ground

19 January 2014	Fire Services	v	Mutual	Tuen Mun, New Territories
15:30 UTC+8				Stadium: Wu Shan Recreation Ground

19 January 2014	Fu Moon	v	Metro Gallery Sun Source	Sham Shui Po, Kowloon
15:30 UTC+8				Stadium: Tai Hang Tung Recreation Ground #2

19 January 2014	Kwong Wah	v	On Good	Tai Po, New Territories
15:30 UTC+8				Stadium: Kwong Fuk Park

=== Round 15 ===
26 January 2014	KCDRSC	v	Eastern District	Kowloon City, Kowloon
13:30 UTC+8				Stadium: Kowloon Tsai Park #1

26 January 2014	Mutual	v	Fu Moon	Wong Tai Sin, Kowloon
13:30 UTC+8				Stadium: Hammer Hill Recreation Ground

26 January 2014	Metro Gallery Sun Source	v	Telecom	Kwai Tsing, New Territories
13:30 UTC+8				Stadium: Kwai Chung Sports Ground

26 January 2014	Kowloon City	v	Kwong Wah	Kowloon City, Kowloon
15:30 UTC+8				Stadium: Kowloon Tsai Park #1

26 January 2014	Sham Shui Po	v	Tsuen Wan	Wong Tai Sin, Kowloon
15:30 UTC+8				Stadium: Hammer Hill Recreation Ground

26 January 2014	Eastern Salon Original	v	Fire Services	Kwai Tsing, New Territories
15:30 UTC+8				Stadium: Kwai Chung Sports Ground

26 January 2014	On Good	v	Yau Tsim Mong	Sham Shui Po, Kowloon
15:30 UTC+8				Stadium: Tai Hang Tung Recreation Ground #2

=== Round 16 ===
9 February 2014	KCDRSC	v	Yau Tsim Mong	Sham Shui Po, Kowloon
13:30 UTC+8				Stadium: Tai Hang Tung Recreation Ground #2

9 February 2014	Mutual	v	Tsuen Wan	Shatin, New Territories
13:30 UTC+8				Stadium: Shatin Sports Ground

9 February 2014	Sham Shui Po	v	Kwong Wah	Sham Shui Po, Kowloon
15:30 UTC+8				Stadium: Tai Hang Tung Recreation Ground #2

9 February 2014	Fu Moon	v	Telecom	Shatin, New Territories
15:30 UTC+8				Stadium: Shatin Sports Ground

9 February 2014	Kowloon City	v	Eastern Salon Original	Kowloon City, Kowloon
15:30 UTC+8				Stadium: Kowloon Tsai Park #1

9 February 2014	On Good	v	Fire Services	Tuen Mun, New Territories
15:30 UTC+8				Stadium: Wu Shan Recreation Ground

20 April 2014 Postponed	Metro Gallery Sun Source	v	Eastern District	Tuen Mun, New Territories
13:30 UTC+8				Stadium: Wu Shan Recreation Ground

=== Round 17 ===
16 February 2014	Kwong Wah	v	KCDRSC	Tai Po, New Territories
13:30 UTC+8				Stadium: Kwong Fuk Park

16 February 2014	Fire Services	v	Fu Moon	Sham Shui Po, Kowloon
13:30 UTC+8				Stadium: Tai Hang Tung

16 February 2014	Telecom	v	Mutual	Tsuen Wan, New Territories
13:30 UTC+8				Stadium: Tsuen Wan Riveria Park

16 February 2014	Eastern District	v	Sham Shui Po	Happy Valley, Hong Kong Island
15:30 UTC+8				Stadium: Happy Valley Recreation Ground #6

16 February 2014	Yau Tsim Mong	v	Kowloon City	Sham Shui Po, Kowloon
15:30 UTC+8				Stadium: Tai Hang Tung

16 February 2014	Tsuen Wan	v	Metro Gallery Sun Source	Tsuen Wan, New Territories
15:30 UTC+8				Stadium: Tsuen Wan Riveria Park

16 February 2014	Eastern Salon Original	v	On Good	Tsuen Wan, New Territories
15:30 UTC+8				Stadium: Tsuen Wan Riveria Park

=== Round 18 ===
23 February 2014	Eastern District	v	Mutual	Happy Valley, Hong Kong Island
13:30 UTC+8				Stadium: Happy Valley Recreation Ground #6

23 February 2014	Eastern Salon Original	v	KCDRSC	Ma On Shan, New Territories
13:30 UTC+8				Stadium: Ma On Shan Recreation Ground

23 February 2014	On Good	v	Kowloon City	Kowloon City, Kowloon
13:30 UTC+8				Stadium: Kowloon Tsai Sports Ground

23 February 2014	Tsuen Wan	v	Fu Moon	Kwai Tsing, New Territories
13:30 UTC+8				Stadium: Kwai Chung Sports Ground

23 February 2014	Kwong Wah	v	Metro Gallery Sun Source	Sham Shui Po, Kowloon
15:30 UTC+8				Stadium: Tai Hang Tung Recreation Ground #2

23 February 2014	Yau Tsim Mong	v	Sham Shui Po	Kowloon City, Kowloon
15:30 UTC+8				Stadium: Kowloon Tsai Sports Ground

23 February 2014	Fire Services	v	Telecom	Kwai Tsing, New Territories
15:30 UTC+8				Stadium: Kwai Chung Sports Ground

=== Round 19 ===
2 March 2014	Metro Gallery Sun Source	v	Yau Tsim Mong	Happy Valley, Hong Kong Island
13:30 UTC+8				Stadium: Happy Valley Recreation Ground #6

2 March 2014	Telecom	v	Tsuen Wan	Fanling, New Territories
13:30 UTC+8				Stadium: Fanling Recreation Ground

2 March 2014	Fu Moon	v	Eastern District	Sham Shui Po, Kowloon
13:30 UTC+8				Stadium: Tai Hung Tung Recreation Ground #2

2 March 2014	KCDRSC	v	On Good	Kowloon City, Kowloon
13:30 UTC+8				Stadium: Kowloon Tsai Park #1

2 March 2014	Sham Shui Po	v	Eastern Salon Original	Sham Shui Po, Kowloon
15:30 UTC+8				Stadium: Tai Hung Tung Recreation Ground #2

2 March 2014	Kowloon City	v	Fire Services	Kowloon City, Kowloon
15:30 UTC+8				Stadium: Kowloon Tsai Park #1

2 March 2014	Mutual	v	Kwong Wah	Sai Kung, New Territories
15:30 UTC+8				Stadium: Sai Kung Tang Shiu Kin Sports Ground

=== Round 20 ===
9 March 2014	KCDRSC	v	Fire Services	Kowloon City, Kowloon
13:30 UTC+8				Stadium: Kowloon Tsai Park #1

9 March 2014	Telecom	v	Kwong Wah	Ma On Shan, New Territories
13:30 UTC+8				Stadium: Ma On Shan Recreation Ground

9 March 2014	Metro Gallery Sun Source	v	On Good	Tuen Mun, New Territories
13:30 UTC+8				Stadium: Wu Shan Recreation Ground

9 March 2014	Fu Moon	v	Yau Tsim Mong	Sham Shui Po, Kowloon
13:30 UTC+8				Stadium: Tai Hang Tung Recreation Ground #2

9 March 2014	Sham Shui Po	v	Kowloon City	Sham Shui Po, Kowloon
15:30 UTC+8				Stadium: Tai Hang Tung Recreation Ground #2

9 March 2014	Mutual	v	Eastern Salon Original	Sheung Shui, New Territories
15:30 UTC+8				Stadium: North District Sports Ground

9 March 2014	Tsuen Wan	v	Eastern District	Tsuen Wan, New Territories
15:30 UTC+8				Stadium: Tsuen Wan Riveria Park

=== Round 21 ===
16 March 2014	Eastern District	v	Telecom	Happy Valley, Hong Kong
13:30 UTC+8				Stadium: Happy Valley Recreation Ground #6

16 March 2014	Fire Services	v	Tsuen Wan	Wong Tai Sin, Kowloon
13:30 UTC+8				Stadium: Po Kong Village Road Park #2

16 March 2014	Kwong Wah	v	Fu Moon	Ma On Shan, New Territories
13:30 UTC+8				Stadium: Ma On Shan Recreation Ground

16 March 2014	On Good	v	Sham Shui Po	Kowloon City, Kowloon
13:30 UTC+8				Stadium: Kowloon Tsai Park #1

16 March 2014	Kowloon City	v	KCDRSC	Kowloon City, Kowloon
15:30 UTC+8				Stadium: Kowloon Tsai Sports Ground

16 March 2014	Yau Tsim Mong	v	Mutual	Kowloon City, Kowloon
15:30 UTC+8				Stadium: Kowloon Tsai Park #1

16 March 2014	Eastern Salon Original	v	Metro Gallery Sun Source	Tai Po, New Territories
15:30 UTC+8				Stadium: Kwong Fuk Park

=== Round 22 ===
23 March 2014	On Good	v	Mutual	Happy Valley, Hong Kong
13:30 UTC+8				Stadium: Happy Valley Recreation Ground #6

23 March 2014	Kowloon City	v	Metro Gallery Sun Source	Kowloon City, Kowloon
13:30 UTC+8				Stadium: Kowloon Tsai Park #1

23 March 2014	Yau Tsim Mong	v	Telecom	Wong Tai Sin, Kowloon
13:30 UTC+8				Stadium: Po Kong Village Road Park #1

23 March 2014	KCDRSC	v	Sham Shui Po	Wong Tai Sin, Kowloon
13:30 UTC+8				Stadium: Po Kong Village Road Park #2

23 March 2014	Fire Services	v	Eastern District	Shatin, New Territories
13:30 UTC+8				Stadium: Shatin Sports Ground

23 March 2014	Eastern Salon Original	v	Fu Moon	Shatin, New Territories
15:30 UTC+8				Stadium: Shatin Sports Ground

=== Round 23 ===
30 March 2014	Fu Moon	v	On Good	Happy Valley, Hong Kong
13:30 UTC+8				Stadium: Happy Valley Recreation Ground #6

30 March 2014	Metro Gallery Sun Source	v	KCDRSC	Kowloon City, Kowloon
13:30 UTC+8				Stadium: Kowloon Tsai Park #1

30 March 2014	Tsuen Wan	v	Yau Tsim Mong	Tsing Yi, New Territories
13:30 UTC+8				Stadium: Tsing Yi Northeast Park

30 March 2014	Mutual	v	Kowloon City	Kowloon City, Kowloon
15:30 UTC+8				Stadium: Kowloon Tsai Sports Ground

30 March 2014	Eastern District	v	Kwong Wah	Happy Valley, Hong Kong
15:30 UTC+8				Stadium: Happy Valley Recreation Ground #6

30 March 2014	Sham Shui Po	v	Fire Services	Kowloon City, Kowloon
15:30 UTC+8				Stadium: Kowloon Tsai Park #1

30 March 2014	Telecom	v	Eastern Salon Original	Tsing Yi, New Territories
15:30 UTC+8				Stadium: Tsing Yi Northeast Park

=== Round 24 ===
6 April 2014	Kowloon City	v	Fu Moon	Kowloon City, Kowloon
13:30 UTC+8				Stadium: Kowloon Tsai Park #1

6 April 2014	Eastern Salon Original	v	Tsuen Wan	Tuen Mun, New Territories
13:30 UTC+8				Stadium: Wu Shan Recreation Ground

6 April 2014	Yau Tsim Mong	v	Eastern District	Sham Shui Po, Kowloon
13:30 UTC+8				Stadium: Tai Hang Tung Recreation Ground

6 April 2014	On Good	v	Telecom	Shatin, New Territories
13:30 UTC+8				Stadium: Shatin Sports Ground

6 April 2014	Sham Shui Po	v	Metro Gallery Sun Source	Sham Shui Po, Kowloon
15:30 UTC+8				Stadium: Tai Hang Tung Recreation Ground

6 April 2014	KCDRSC	v	Mutual	Shatin, New Territories
15:30 UTC+8				Stadium: Shatin Sports Ground

6 April 2014	Fire Services	v	Kwong Wah	Ma On Shan, New Territories
15:30 UTC+8				Stadium: Ma On Shan Sports Ground

=== Round 25 ===
13 April 2014	Fire Services	v	Yau Tsim Mong	Ma On Shan, New Territories
13:30 UTC+8				Stadium: Ma On Shan Sports Ground

13 April 2014	Eastern Salon Original	v	Kwong Wah	Happy Valley, Hong Kong Island
15:30 UTC+8				Stadium: Happy Valley Recreation Ground #6

13 April 2014	Sham Shui Po	v	Fu Moon	Sham Shui Po, Kowloon
15:30 UTC+8				Stadium: Tai Hang Tung Recreation Ground #2

13 April 2014	Kowloon City	v	Tsuen Wan	Kowloon City, Kowloon
15:30 UTC+8				Stadium: Kowloon Tsai Park #1

13 April 2014	Metro Gallery Sun Source	v	Mutual	Shatin, New Territories
15:30 UTC+8				Stadium: Shatin Sports Ground

13 April 2014	On Good	v	Eastern District	Sheung Shui, New Territories
15:30 UTC+8				Stadium: North District Sports Ground

13 April 2014	KCDRSC	v	Telecom	Kwai Tsing, New Territories
15:30 UTC+8				Stadium: Kwai Chung Sports Ground

=== Round 26 ===
27 April 2014	Eastern District	v	Eastern Salon Original	Happy Valley, Hong Kong Island
15:30 UTC+8				Stadium: Happy Valley Recreation Ground #6

27 April 2014	Telecom	v	Kowloon City	Kowloon City, Kowloon
15:30 UTC+8				Stadium: Kowloon Tsai Sports Ground

27 April 2014	Metro Gallery Sun Source	v	Fire Services	Kowloon City, Kowloon
15:30 UTC+8				Stadium: Kowloon Tsai Park #1

27 April 2014	Kwong Wah	v	Yau Tsim Mong	Wong Tai Sin, Kowloon
15:30 UTC+8				Stadium: Po Kong Village Road Park #1

27 April 2014	Fu Moon	v	KCDRSC	Ma On Shan, New Territories
15:30 UTC+8				Stadium: Ma On Shan Recreation Ground

27 April 2014	Mutual	v	Sham Shui Po	Tai Po, New Territories
15:30 UTC+8				Stadium: Kwong Fuk Park

27 April 2014	Tsuen Wan	v	On Good	Tsing Yi, New Territories
15:30 UTC+8				Stadium: Tsing Yi Northeast Park
