= 2003–04 Hong Kong League Cup =

Hong Kong League Cup 2003–04 is the 4th staging of the Hong Kong League Cup.

The competition was sponsored by Sunray Cave Limited.

The 10 teams from Hong Kong First Division League were divided into 2 groups. The top 2 teams in the groups entered the semi-finals.

== Group stage ==
All times are Hong Kong Time (UTC+8).

=== Group A ===
Team	Pts	Pld	W	D	L	GF	GA	GD
Happy Valley	10	4	3	1	0	11	2	9
Buler Rangers	8	4	2	2	0	11	6	5
Nancheng Real Estate	7	4	2	1	1	6	8	-2
South China	3	4	1	0	3	3	6	-3
Fire Services	0	4	0	0	4	2	11	-9

15 January 2004

Buler Rangers	3-3	Nancheng Real Estate

15 January 2004

Happy Valley	3-0	Fire Services

29 January 2004

Fire Services	1-4	Buler Rangers

29 January 2004

Nancheng Real Estate	2-0	South China

1 February 2004

Fire Services	0-1	Nancheng Real Estate

1 February 2004

Happy Valley	1-0	South China

5 February 2004

Buler Rangers	2-2	Happy Valley

5 February 2004

South China	1-0	Fire Services

13 February 2004

Buler Rangers	2-0	South China

14 February 2004

Happy Valley	5-0	Nancheng Real Estate

=== Group B ===
Team	Pts	Pld	W	D	L	GF	GA	GD
Sun Hei	9	4	3	0	1	9	3	6
Sunray Cave	7	4	2	1	1	8	4	4
Xiangxue Pharmaceutical	5	4	1	2	1	4	5	-1
Kitchee	3	4	0	3	1	4	6	-2
Fukien	2	4	0	2	2	1	8	-7

31 January 2004

Kitchee	1-1	Sunray Cave

31 January 2004

Sun Hei	3-0	Fukien

3 February 2004

Fukien	0-0	Kitchee

3 February 2004

Sunray Cave	2-0	Xiangxue Pharmaceutical

7 February 2004

Fukien	0-4	Sunray Cave

7 February 2004

Sun Hei	0-1	Xiangxue Pharmaceutical

10 February 2004

Sunray Cave	1-3	Sun Hei

10 February 2004

Xiangxue Pharmaceutical	2-2	Kitchee

13 February 2004

Fukien	1-1	Xiangxue Pharmaceutical

14 February 2004

Sun Hei	3-1	Kitchee

== Knockout stage ==
=== Bracket ===
Semifinals
A1	Happy Valley	5
B2	Sunray Cave	1
A2	Buler Rangers	1 (1)
B1	Sun Hei (golden goal)	1 (2)

Finals
A1	Happy Valley	2
B1	Sun Hei	4

Hong Kong League Cup 2003–04 Winner

Sun Hei
Second Title

=== Semi-finals ===
22 February 2004

Sun Hei	2-1 (golden goal)	Buler Rangers
Law Chun Pong ?'; Andre ?'		? ?'

Mong Kok Stadium
Attendance: –
22 February 2004

Happy Valley	5-1	Sunray Cave
Gerard Guy Ambassa ?', ?'; Martin Jancula ?'; Kwok Yue Hung ?'; Sham Kwok Fai ?'		? ?'

Mong Kok Stadium
Attendance: –

=== Final ===
29 February 2004

Sun Hei	4-2	Happy Valley
Kwok Man Tik 4'; Chu Siu Kei 7'; Law Chun Pong 35'; Wong Chun Yue 90'		Lee Chun Yip 17'; Kwok Yue Hung 30'

Attendance: 3,284

== Individual Awards ==
- Top Scorers: Roger Batoum of Happy Valley, Cornelius Udebuluzor of Buler Rangers, Musa Shannon of Nancheng Real Estate (4 Goals)
- Best Defensive Player: Lau Chi Keung of Sun Hei

== Trivia ==
- There was a pre-match before this League Cup final where La Salle College played against West Island School in the All Hong Kong Schools Jing Ying Football Tournament 2003-04 final. West Island School captured the champion by winning 1-0.
