= 2003–04 Hong Kong FA Cup =

Tournament details
- Country: Hong Kong

Final positions
- Champions: Happy Valley (2nd title)
- Runners-up: Kitchee

2003–04 Hong Kong FA Cup was the 30th staging of the Hong Kong FA Cup. The cup was won by Happy Valley who won 3-1 against Kitchee in the final.

The competition started on 27 April 2004 with 10 Hong Kong First Division clubs. Four of them took part in the first round to determine which team advanced to the quarter-finals. From quarter finals onward, the cup competition was a single-elimination tournament. Although all the matches before the final was held at the Mongkok Stadium, the final was staged at the Hong Kong Stadium on 9 May 2004.

The competition was officially known as 2003/04 HKFA Dongguan Centurycity Real Estate FA Cup due to sponsorship from Dongguan Centurycity Real Estate Development Limited.

== Teams ==
- Buler Rangers
- Fire Services
- Fukien
- Happy Valley
- Kitchee
- Nancheng Real Estate
- South China
- Sun Hei
- Sunray Cave
- Xiangxue Pharmaceutical

== Fixtures and results ==
All times are Hong Kong Time (UTC+8).

=== Bracket ===
First round
Fukien	1
Buler Rangers	0
Sunray Cave	2
Nancheng Real Estate	1

Quarter-finals
Happy Valley	4
Fukien	0
Fire Services	1
Xiangxue Pharmaceutical	2
South China	0
Kitchee	1
Sunray Cave	2
Sun Hei	4

Semi-finals
Happy Valley (a.e.t.)	1 (2)
Xiangxue Pharmaceutical	1 (1)
Kitchee (a.e.t.)	1 (2)
Sun Hei	1 (1)

Final
Happy Valley	3
Kitchee	1

=== First round ===
27 April 2004
18:00

Fukien	1 – 0	Buler Rangers
Godfred 90+'	(Report)

Mong Kok Stadium
Attendance: 231

27 April 2004
20:15

Sunray Cave	2 – 1	Nancheng Real Estate
Liang Zicheng 53'	(Report)	Huang Ke 65'; Xu Guang 90'

Mong Kok Stadium
Attendance: 231

=== Quarter-finals ===
29 April 2004
18:00

South China	0 – 1	Kitchee
	(Report)	Jovanovic 25'

Mong Kok Stadium

29 April 2004
20:15

Fire Services	1 – 2	Xiangxue Pharmaceutical
Yau Ka Chun 78'	(Report)	He Yihui 50'; Chen Xian 54'

Mong Kok Stadium

30 April 2004
18:00

Sun Hei	4 – 2	Sunray Cave
Akosah 22' 87'; Ricardo 24'; Marcio 63'	(Report)	Liang Xiang 30'; Chan Xu 75'

Mong Kok Stadium

30 April 2004
20:15

Fukien	0 – 4	Happy Valley
	(Report)	Cheung Sai Ho 8' 74' (pen.); Roger 12'; Lawrence 57'

Mong Kok Stadium

=== Semi-finals ===
2 May 2004
15:30

Sun Hei	1 – 2 (a.e.t.)	Kitchee
Marcio 57'	(Report)	Feng Jizhi 50'; Bamnjo 104'

Mong Kok Stadium
Attendance: 1,482

2 May 2004
17:15

Happy Valley	2 – 1 (a.e.t.)	Xiangxue Pharmaceutical
Jancula 67'; Sham Kwok Keung 97'	(Report)	He Wenyao 60'

Mong Kok Stadium
Attendance: 1,482

=== Final ===
9 May 2004
15:00

Kitchee	1 – 3	Happy Valley
Liu Quankun 53'	(Report)	Gerard 24' 54'; Jancula 36'

Hong Kong Stadium

== Goalscorers ==
Rank	Scorer	Team	Goals
1	(Cameroon) Gerard	Happy Valley	2
=	(Slovakia) Martin Jancula	Happy Valley	2
=	(Hong Kong) Cheung Sai Ho	Happy Valley	2
=	(Brazil) Marcio	Sun Hei	2
=	(Cameroon) Julius Akosah	Sun Hei	2
6	(Hong Kong) Yau Ka Chun	Fire Services	1
=	(Ghana) Godfred Karikari	Fukien	1
=	(Cameroon) Roger Batoum	Happy Valley	1
=	(Hong Kong) Lawrence	Happy Valley	1
=	(Hong Kong) Sham Kwok Keung	Happy Valley	1
=	(Hong Kong) Feng Jizhi	Kitchee	1
=	(Cameroon) Wilfed Bamnjo	Kitchee	1
=	(Hong Kong) Liu Quankun	Kitchee	1
=	(Serbia and Montenegro) Mihailo Jovanović	Kitchee	1
=	(China) Huang Ke	Nancheng Real Estate	1
=	(China) Xu Guang	Nancheng Real Estate	1
=	(Brazil) Ricardo	Sun Hei	1
=	(China) Liang Xiang	Sunray Cave	1
=	(China) Chan Xu	Sunray Cave	1
=	(China) Liang Zicheng	Sunray Cave	1
=	(China) He Yihui	Xiangxue Pharmaceutical	1
=	(China) Chen Xian	Xiangxue Pharmaceutical	1
=	(China) He Wenyao	Xiangxue Pharmaceutical	1

== Prizes ==
=== Team awards ===
- Champion (HK$150,000): Happy Valley

=== Individual awards ===
- Top Scorer Award (HK$5,000 in total): (Cameroon) Gerard, (Slovakia) Martin Jancula, (Hong Kong) Cheung Sai Ho (Happy Valley), (Brazil) Marcio, (Cameroon) Julius Akosah (Sun Hei)
- Best Defender Award (HK$5,000): (Hong Kong) Lee Wai Man (Happy Valley)
