= 2013–14 in Hong Kong football =

Football in Hong Kong
- Season: 2013–14

Men's football
- First Division: Kitchee
- Second Division: Wofoo Tai Po
- Third Division: Metro Gallery Sun Source
- Fourth Division: Sai Kung
- Senior Shield: South China
- FA Cup: Eastern Salon
- Season play-off: South China

The 2013–14 season is the 112th season of competitive football in Hong Kong, starting in July 2013 and ending in June 2014.

== Promotion and relegation ==
League	Promoted Teams	Relegated Teams
First Division	Yuen Long; Happy Valley; Eastern Salon	Wofoo Tai Po
Second Division	Wong Tai Sin; Lucky Mile; Kwun Tong; Kwai Tsing	Sham Shui Po
Third Division	Yau Tsim Mong; Mutual; Kwong Wah; Sun Source	Fukien
Fourth Division	Nil	Blake Garden

== Clubs removed ==
- Blake Garden were placed bottom of the table last season, meaning being eliminated from Hong Kong league system.

== Representative team ==
=== Hong Kong ===
==== 2015 AFC Asian Cup qualification ====
The draw for the group stage of qualification was held in Australia on 9 October 2012. Hong Kong was drawn with Uzbekistan, United Arab Emirates and Vietnam. Hong Kong will start their 2015 Asian Cup qualifying campaign in February 2013.

Team	Pld	W	D	L	GF	GA	GD	Pts
United Arab Emirates	6	5	1	0	18	3	+15	16
Uzbekistan	6	3	2	1	10	4	+6	11
Hong Kong	6	1	1	4	2	13	−11	4
Vietnam	6	1	0	5	5	15	−10	3

15 October 2013 Matchday 3	Hong Kong	0 – 4	United Arab Emirates	So Kon Po, Hong Kong
20:00 (UTC+8)		Report	30', 55', 90' Mabkhout; 90+5' Abbas	Stadium: Hong Kong Stadium (Capacity: 40,000); Attendance: 7,923

Match detail

Hong Kong	United Arab Emirates

GK	1	Yapp Hung Fai
RB	12	Lo Kwan Yee		(substituted off) 69'
CB	2	Lee Chi Ho
CB	3	Wisdom Fofo Agbo
LB	21	Kwok Kin Pong	(yellow card) 87'
DM	15	Andy Nägelein
DM	6	Huang Yang		(substituted off) 46'
DM	16	Leung Chun Pong
RM	23	Ju Yingzhi		(substituted off) 36'
LM	22	Jaimes McKee	(yellow card) 21'
CF	7	Chan Siu Ki (c)
Substitutes:
GK	18	Zhang Chunhui
GK	19	Wang Zhenpeng
MF	4	Man Pei Tak
MF	5	Liu Songwei
MF	8	Lee Hong Lim
MF	9	Lee Wai Lim		(substituted in) 69'
MF	10	Lam Ka Wai		(substituted in) 46'
FW	11	Godfred Karikari		(substituted in) 36'
DF	13	Cheung Kin Fung
DF	14	Jack Sealy
DF	17	Chiu Chun Kit
FW	20	Chan Man Fai
Coach:
(South Korea) Kim Pan-Gon

GK	1	Ali Khasif
DF	3	Walid Abbas
MF	4	Habib Fardan
DF	6	Mohanad Salem
FW	7	Ali Mabkhout	(yellow card) 6'
MF	9	Abdulaziz Hussain
FW	11	Ahmed Khalil
MF	13	Khamis Esmaeel
MF	17	Majed Hassan
FW	21	Omar Abdulrahman
DF	23	Mohamed Ahmed
Substitutions:
GK	12	Khalid Eisa
GK	22	Ahmed Mahmoud Juma
MF	5	Suhail Salem
DF	8	Hamdan Al Kamali
FW	10	Ismail Matar
MF	14	Khaled Abdulrahman
FW	15	Ismail Al Hammadi
MF	16	Haboosh Saleh
MF	18	Mohamed Fawzi
MF	19	Salem Saleh
DF	20	Mohamed Ismail Ahmed Ismail
Coach:

15 November 2013 Matchday 4	United Arab Emirates	4 – 0	Hong Kong	Abu Dhabi, United Arab Emirates
19:30 (UTC+4)		Report		Stadium: Mohammed Bin Zayed Stadium (Capacity: 42,056); Attendance: 10,871

Match detail

United Arab Emirates	Hong Kong

GK	1	Ali Khasif
DF	3	Walid Abbas
MF	4	Habib Fardan
DF	6	Mohanad Salem
DF	8	Hamdan Al Kamali
FW	10	Ismail Matar
MF	13	Khamis Esmaeel
MF	17	Majed Hassan
MF	18	Mohamed Fawzi
FW	21	Omar Abdulrahman
Substitutions:
GK	12	Khalid Eisa
GK	22	Ahmed Mahmoud Ashoori
FW	11	Ahmed Khalil
FW	15	Ismail Al Hammadi
Coach:

GK	1	Yapp Hung Fai
RB	12	Lo Kwan Yee		(substituted off) 61'
CB	2	Lee Chi Ho
CB	15	Andy Nägelein	(yellow card) 15'
LB	21	Kwok Kin Pong
DF	6	Huang Yang
DF	4	Bai He
DF	16	Leung Chun Pong
RW	8	Lee Hong Lim		(substituted off) 74'
LW	12	Godfred Karikari	(yellow card) 45'	(substituted off) 46'
CF	7	Chan Siu Ki
Substitutions:
GK	18	Leung Hing Kit
GK	19	Wang Zhenpeng
DF	3	Wisdom Fofo Agbo
FW	5	Wong Wai
FW	9	Lam Hok Hei
MF	10	Lam Ka Wai
DF	13	Cheung Kin Fung		(substituted in) 61'
DF	14	Jack Sealy
FW	20	Chan Man Fai
FW	22	Jaimes McKee		(substituted in) 46'
MF	23	Ju Yingzhi		(substituted in) 74'
Coach:
(South Korea) Kim Pan-Gon

19 November 2013 Matchday 5	Hong Kong	0 – 2	Uzbekistan	So Kon Po, Hong Kong
20:00 (UTC+8)		Report (HKFC); Report (AFC)	84' Shodiev; 89' Ahmedov	Stadium: Hong Kong Stadium (Capacity: 40,000); Attendance: 5,679; Referee: Nawaf Shukralla (Bahrain)

Match detail

Hong Kong	Uzbekistan

GK	1	Yapp Hung Fai (c)
RB	12	Lo Kwan Yee
CB	2	Lee Chi Ho
CB	15	Andy Nägelein
LB	13	Cheung Kin Fung	(yellow card) 39' (yellow-red card) 45'
DM	4	Bai He
DM	16	Leung Chun Pong
CM	10	Lam Ka Wai		(substituted off) 46'
RM	20	Chan Man Fai		(substituted off) 78'
LM	21	Kwok Kin Pong
CF	7	Chan Siu Ki	(yellow card) 77'	(substituted off) 80'
Substitutions:
DF	3	Wisdom Fofo Agbo		(substituted in) 46'
FW	5	Wong Wai
MF	6	Huang Yang
MF	8	Lee Hong Lim
FW	9	Lam Hok Hei
FW	11	Godfred Karikari
DF	14	Jack Sealy
GK	18	Leung Hing Kit
GK	19	Wang Zhenpeng
FW	22	Jaimes McKee		(substituted in) 80'
MF	23	Ju Yingzhi		(substituted in) 78'
Head Coach:
(South Korea) Kim Pan-Gon

GK	12	Eldorbek Suyunov
RB	20	Islom Tukhtakhodjaev
CB	5	Anzur Ismailov
CB	13	Davron Khashimov	(substituted off) 46'
LB	19	Vitaliy Denisov
DM	7	Azizbek Haydarov (c)
DM	14	Jamshid Iskanderov	(substituted off) 74'
CM	9	Odil Ahmedov
FW	15	Vokhid Shodiev
FW	23	Sardor Rashidov
FW	10	Igor Sergeev	(substituted off) 82'
Substitutions:
GK	1	Murod Zukhurov
DF	3	Shavkat Mullajanov
MF	4	Dilshod Djuraev
FW	6	Ivan Nagaev
MF	8	Server Djeparov	(substituted in) 82'
FW	11	Bahodir Nasimov	(substituted in) 46'
FW	16	Shahzodbek Nurmatov
MF	17	Sanzhar Tursunov
DF	18	Fozil Musaev
GK	21	Aleksandr Lobanov
MF	22	Shavkat Salomov	(substituted in) 74'
Head Coach:
(Uzbekistan) Mirjalol Qosimov

5 March 2014 Matchday 6	Vietnam	3 – 1	Hong Kong	Hanoi, Vietnam
TBC (UTC+7)		Report	81' Lo Kwan Yee	Stadium: Mỹ Đình National Stadium (Capacity: 40,000); Attendance: 5,800; Referee: Mohd Amirul Izwan Yaacob (Malaysia)

Match detail

Vietnam	Hong Kong

GK	1	Dương Hồng Sơn
Substitutions:
Coach:

GK	1	Yapp Hung Fai
RB	12	Lo Kwan Yee
CB	15	Chan Wai Ho (c)
CB	3	Wisdom Fofo Agbo
LB	21	Kwok Kin Pong
DM	6	Huang Yang
CM	23	Ju Yingzhi	(yellow card) 40'	(substituted off) 46'
CM	10	Lam Ka Wai
RW	22	Jaimes McKee
LW	11	Christian Annan		(substituted off) 30'
CF	7	Chan Siu Ki	(yellow card) 58'
Substitutions:
GK	18	Tse Tak Him
GK	19	Wang Zhenpeng
DF	2	Che Runqiu
MF	4	Bai He
MF	5	Andy Nägelein	(yellow card) 66'	(substituted in) 46'
MF	8	Lee Hong Lim
FW	9	Lam Hok Hei		(substituted in) 30' (substituted off) 61'
FW	14	Sham Kwok Keung
MF	16	Leung Chun Pong
DF	17	Tsang Chi Hau
FW	20	Wong Wai		(substituted in) 61'
Coach:
(South Korea) Kim Pan-Gon

==== 2014 Guangdong–Hong Kong Cup ====
This is a tournament between two teams representing Hong Kong and Guangdong Province of China respectively. The first leg will take place in Hong Kong, being held at Mong Kok Stadium, and the second leg took place in Huizhou, Guangdong, being held at Huizhou Olympic Stadium.

29 December 2013 1st leg	Hong Kong	2 – 3	Guangdong	Mong Kok, Kowloon
15:00(GMT+8)	Chan Siu Ki 39'; Ju Yingzhi 45+1'	Report	4' Cui Ning; 9' Huang Haoxuan; 89' Lu Lin	Stadium: Mong Kok Stadium (Capacity:6,680); Attendance: 3,502; Referee: Ho Wai Sing (Hong Kong)

Match detail

Hong Kong	Guangdong

HONG KONG:
GK	1	(Hong Kong) Yapp Hung Fai (c)
RB	21	(Hong Kong) Kwok Kin Pong		(substituted off) 69'
CB	2	(Hong Kong) Lee Chi Ho		(substituted off) 69'
CB	5	(Hong Kong) Tsang Chi Hau	(yellow card) 79'
LB	24	(Hong Kong) Fong Pak Lun
DM	16	(Hong Kong) Leung Chun Pong		(substituted off) 73'
CM	22	(Hong Kong) Ju Yingzhi
AM	10	(Hong Kong) Lam Ka Wai		(substituted off) 86'
RW	20	(Hong Kong) Chan Man Fai		(substituted off) 60'
LW	8	(Hong Kong) Lee Hong Lim		(substituted off) 82'
ST	7	(Hong Kong) Chan Siu Ki	(yellow card) 27'
Substitutes:
GK	18	(Hong Kong) Leung Hing Kit
DF	3	(Hong Kong) Che Runqiu		(substituted in) 69'
MF	4	(Hong Kong) Bai He
MF	6	(Hong Kong) Luk Michael Chi Ho		(substituted in) 86'
DF	13	(Hong Kong) Cheung Kin Fung
FW	14	(Hong Kong) Sham Kwok Keung		(substituted in) 60'
MF	15	(Hong Kong) Ip Chung Long		(substituted in) 82'
DF	17	(Hong Kong) Cheung Chi Yung		(substituted in) 69'
FW	22	(Hong Kong) Jaimes McKee		(substituted in) 73'
Coach:
(South Korea) Kim Pan-Gon

GUANGDONG:
GK	12	(China) Pan Weiming
RB	23	(China) Feng Zhuoyi
CB	3	(China) Liu Sheng
CB	5	(China) Cui Ning	(yellow card) 1'
LB	20	(China) Zhu Cong		(substituted off) 87'
RM	16	(China) Li Jian		(substituted off) 66'
CM	18	(China) Zhang Yong		(substituted off) 90+5'
CM	17	(China) Yu Jianfeng		(substituted off) 15'
CM	25	(China) Yang Jian
LM	7	(China) Huang Haoxuan
ST	9	(China) Wei Jingxing		(substituted off) 37'
Substitutes:
GK	1	(China) Liang Hua
DF	4	(China) Guo Zichao
MF	8	(China) Wang Qiang
MF	10	(China) Lu Lin		(substituted in) 37'
MF	11	(China) Yang Bin		(substituted in) 87'
FW	22	(China) Ye Weichao		(substituted in) 15' (substituted off) 77'
MF	26	(China) Liu Tao		(substituted in) 90+5'
MF	29	(China) Chang Feiya		(substituted in) 66'
FW	33	(China) Cai Jingyuan		(substituted in) 77'
Coach:
(China) Ou Chuliang

|}

==== Friendly matches in first half season ====
Head coach Kim Pan-Gon confirmed that two friendly matches are arranged in September for the preparation of 2015 AFC Asian Cup qualification. Hong Kong will face Myanmar away on 6 September, and return to Hong Kong for another friendly match against Singapore on 10 September.

6 September 2013	Myanmar	0 – 0	Hong Kong	Yangon, Myanmar
17:00 (UTC+6:30)		Report		Stadium: Thuwunna Stadium

Match detail

Myanmar	Hong Kong

Coach:

GK	1	Yapp Hung Fai
RB	14	Jack Sealy	(substituted off) 57'
CB	2	Lee Chi Ho
CB	3	Wisdom Fofo Agbo
LB	13	Cheung Kin Fung	(substituted off) 80'
DM	4	Bai He
CM	15	Ngan Lok Fung	(substituted off) 46'
CM	24	Ju Yingzhi	(substituted off) 70'
RM	9	Lee Wai Lim	(substituted off) 46'
LM	11	Godfred Karikari
CF	7	Chan Siu Ki (c)
Substitutions:
DF	5	Liu Quankun	(substituted in) 80'
MF	6	Huang Yang	(substituted in) 46'
MF	8	Lee Hong Lim	(substituted in) 70'
MF	10	Lam Ka Wai
DF	17	Chiu Chun Kit
GK	18	Tse Tak Him
GK	19	Wang Zhenpeng
DF	21	Kwok Kin Pong	(substituted in) 57'
FW	22	Jaimes McKee	(substituted in) 46'
Coach:
(South Korea) Kim Pan-Gon

10 September 2013	Hong Kong	1 – 0	Singapore	Mong Kok, Kowloon
20:00 (UTC+8)	Bai He 60'	Report		Stadium: Mong Kok Stadium (Capacity: 6,680); Attendance: 3,990

Match detail

Hong Kong	Singapore

GK	1	Yapp Hung Fai
RB	21	Kwok Kin Pong
CB	2	Lee Chi Ho (c)
CB	3	Wisdom Fofo Agbo
LB	13	Cheung Kin Fung		(substituted off) 84'
DM	6	Huang Yang		(substituted off) 58'
DM	4	Bai He		(substituted off) 87'
AM	24	Ju Yingzhi		(substituted off) 71'
RM	11	Godfred Karikari		(substituted off) 66'
LM	22	Jaimes McKee		(substituted off) 74'
ST	7	Chan Siu Ki	(yellow card) 47'
Substitutions:
GK	18	Tse Tak Him
GK	19	Wang Zhenpeng
DF	5	Liu Quankun		(substituted in) 87'
MF	8	Lee Hong Lim		(substituted in) 66'
MF	9	Lee Wai Lim		(substituted in) 74'
MF	10	Lam Ka Wai		(substituted in) 58'
DF	14	Jack Sealy			(substituted in) 84'
DF	17	Chiu Chun Kit
MF	25	Ngan Lok Fung		(substituted in) 71'
Head Coach:
(South Korea) Kim Pan-Gon

Substitutions:
Coach:

== First Division League ==
Pos	Team	Pld	W	D	L	GF	GA	GD	Pts	Qualification or relegation
1	Kitchee (C)	18	15	3	0	47	12	+35	48	2015 AFC Champions League play-off stage
2	Sun Pegasus	18	10	2	6	40	28	+12	32	2013–14 Hong Kong season play-off
3	South China	18	8	8	2	35	24	+11	32	2015 AFC Cup (Note: South China won the 2013–14 Hong Kong season play-off and thus qualified for the 2015 AFC Cup group stage.)
4	Royal Southern (R)	18	5	6	7	25	32	−7	21	2013–14 Hong Kong season play-off and relegation to 2014–15 Hong Kong First Division League (Note: Since the 2013–14 Hong Kong Senior Challenge Shield winners (South China) would at this point qualify for the 2013–14 Hong Kong season play-off, the 4th placed team would qualify for the Season Play-off. At the same time, Royal Southern declined to participate in the 2014–15 Hong Kong Premier League and would self-relegate in the following season.)
5	Hong Kong Rangers	18	5	6	7	23	32	−9	21	
6	Eastern Salon	18	5	6	7	34	37	−3	21	2013–14 Hong Kong season play-off (Note: Eastern Salon qualified for the 2013–14 Hong Kong season play-off as winners of the 2013–14 Hong Kong FA Cup.)
7	I-Sky Yuen Long	18	5	5	8	25	33	−8	20	
8	Sunray Cave JC Sun Hei (R)	18	5	4	9	32	41	−9	19	Relegation to 2014–15 Hong Kong First Division League (Note: Sunray Cave JC Sun Hei & Citizen declined to participate in the 2014–15 Hong Kong Premier League and would self-relegate in the following season.)
9	Citizen (R)	18	4	6	8	25	33	−8	18	Relegation to 2014–15 Hong Kong First Division League
10	Yokohama FC Hong Kong	18	3	4	11	25	39	−14	13	
11	Happy Valley (D, R)	0	0	0	0	0	0	0	0	Excluded, record expunged Relegation to 2014–15 Hong Kong First Division League (Note: On 13 February 2014, the HKFA announced that as a result of a match-fixing investigation, both Tuen Mun and Happy Valley would be excluded from the league, and their records would be expunged.)
12	Tuen Mun (D, R)	0	0	0	0	0	0	0	0	Excluded, record expunged Relegation to 2014–15 Hong Kong First Division League

Updated to match(es) played on 11 May 2014. Source: Hong Kong Football Association
Rules for classification: 1) points; 2) head-to-head points; 3) head-to-head goal difference; 4) head-to-head goals scored; 5) goal difference; 6) number of goals scored.
(C) Champions; (D) Disqualified; (R) Relegated

== Second Division League ==
Pos	Team	Pld	W	D	L	GF	GA	GD	Pts	Promotion or relegation
1	Wofoo Tai Po	22	17	5	0	67	11	+56	56	Promotion to Premier League
2	Wong Tai Sin	22	17	3	2	56	12	+44	54	Promotion to Premier League
3	Hong Kong FC	22	16	3	3	68	19	+49	51	
4	Shatin	22	13	5	4	54	23	+31	44	
5	Double Flower	22	10	4	8	56	36	+20	34	
6	Tai Chung	22	9	1	12	42	66	−24	28	
7	Kwai Tsing	22	8	3	11	43	54	−11	27	
8	Kwun Tong	22	7	2	13	24	42	−18	23	
9	Wanchai	22	6	3	13	20	44	−24	21	
10	Lucky Mile	22	6	0	16	24	60	−36	18	
11	Wing Yee	22	2	6	14	21	58	−37	12	Relegation to Second Division
12	Tuen Mun FC	22	3	1	18	34	84	−50	10	Relegation to Second Division

Updated to match(es) played on 10 May 2014. Source: Hong Kong Football Association
Rules for classification: 1) points; 2) head-to-head points; 3) head-to-head goal difference; 4) head-to-head goals scored; 5) goal difference; 6) number of goals scored.

== Third Division League ==
Pos	Team	Pld	W	D	L	GF	GA	GD	Pts	Promotion or relegation
1	Metro Gallery Sun Source	26	23	1	2	113	30	+83	70	Promotion to First Division
2	Yau Tsim Mong	26	22	3	1	82	20	+62	69	Promotion to First Division
3	Mutual	26	16	5	5	61	30	+31	53	
4	Eastern Salon Original	26	15	0	11	77	53	+24	45	
5	Sham Shui Po	26	13	6	7	69	44	+25	45	
6	Eastern District	26	13	1	12	62	46	+16	40	
7	Kwong Wah	26	10	3	13	37	43	−6	33	
8	On Good	26	10	3	13	42	48	−6	33	
9	Tsuen Wan	26	7	8	11	38	46	−8	29	
10	Fire Services	26	7	8	11	32	51	−19	29	
11	Kowloon City	26	8	3	15	40	54	−14	27	
12	KCDRSC	26	7	4	15	34	70	−36	25	Relegation to Third Division
13	Telecom	26	4	4	18	31	64	−33	16	Relegation to Third Division
14	Fu Moon	25	0	4	21	16	135	−119	4	Relegation to Third Division

Updated to match(es) played on 27 April 2014. Source: Hong Kong Football Association
Rules for classification: 1) points; 2) head-to-head points; 3) head-to-head goal difference; 4) head-to-head goals scored; 5) goal difference; 6) number of goals scored.

== Fourth Division League ==
Pos	Team	Pld	W	D	L	GF	GA	GD	Pts	Promotion or relegation
1	Sai Kung	20	17	1	2	86	10	+76	52	Promotion to Third Division
2	GFC Friends	20	14	4	2	41	21	+20	46	
3	Central & Western	20	12	2	6	47	20	+27	38	
4	Tung Sing	20	11	4	5	51	18	+33	37	
5	Ornament	20	8	7	5	31	46	−15	31	
6	Islands	20	9	2	9	39	44	−5	29	
7	St. Joseph's	20	8	1	11	32	28	+4	25	
8	Fukien	20	7	3	10	41	30	+11	24	
9	North District	20	5	3	12	30	51	−21	18	
10	Lung Moon	20	4	3	13	27	46	−19	15	
11	Solon	20	0	0	20	7	118	−111	0	Eliminated from League System

Updated to match(es) played on 1 December 2013. Source: Hong Kong Football Association
Rules for classification: 1) points; 2) head-to-head points; 3) head-to-head goal difference; 4) head-to-head goals scored; 5) goal difference; 6) number of goals scored.

== Managerial changes ==
The following table only shows changes in First Division.

Team	Outgoing manager	Manner of departure	Date of vacancy	Position in table	Incoming manager	Date of appointment
Kitchee	(Spain) Josep Gombau	Signed by Adelaide United	30 April 2013	Pre-season	(Spain) Àlex Gómez	21 May 2013
South China	(Hong Kong) Liu Chun Fai	End of contract	20 June 2013	Pre-season	(Hong Kong) Cheung Po Chun	1 July 2013
Biu Chun Rangers	(Hong Kong) Chan Hung Ping	End of contract	30 June 2013	Pre-season	(Brazil) José Ricardo Rambo	6 July 2013

== Exhibition matches ==
=== Manchester United's Tour 2013 against Kitchee ===
2012–13 Premier League champions Manchester United will play against 2012–13 Hong Kong FA Cup champions Kitchee on Monday, 29 July 2013 at the Hong Kong Stadium as part of Manchester United's Tour 2013.

29 July 2013	Kitchee (Hong Kong)	2–5	(England) Manchester United	So Kon Po, Hong Kong
20:00 (GMT+8)	Lam Ka Wai 51'; Alex 68'		Welbeck 16'; Smalling 19'; Fabio 22'; Januzaj 49'; Lingard 80'	Stadium: Hong Kong Stadium; Attendance: 39,102; Referee: Ng Chiu Kok (Hong Kong)

Match detail

Kitchee	Manchester United

GK	1	(Hong Kong) Wang Zhenpeng	(substituted off) 89'
RB	21	(Hong Kong) Tsang Kam To	(substituted off) 62'
CB	2	(Spain) Fernando Recio	(substituted off) 83'
CB	5	(Pakistan) Zesh Rehman
LB	3	(Spain) Dani Cancela
DM	19	(Hong Kong) Huang Yang
CM	7	(Hong Kong) Chu Siu Kei (c)	(substituted off) 31'
AM	10	(Hong Kong) Lam Ka Wai	(substituted off) 69'
LW	15	(Hong Kong) Christian Annan	(substituted off) 52'
RW	8	(Nigeria) Alex Tayo Akande	(substituted off) 81'
CF	9	(Spain) Juan Belencoso	(substituted off) 73'
Substitutes:
GK	23	(China) Guo Jianqiao	(substituted in) 89'
MF	6	(Hong Kong) Gao Wen	(substituted in) 87'
MF	11	(Hong Kong) To Hon To	(substituted in) 81'
DF	13	(Hong Kong) Cheung Kin Fung	(substituted in) 62'
DF	14	(Hong Kong) Liu Quankun
DF	16	(Hong Kong) Tsang Chi Hau	(substituted in) 83'
FW	17	(Hong Kong) Chan Man Fai	(substituted in) 69'
FW	18	(Spain) Jordi Tarrés	(substituted in) 73'
MF	20	(Canada) Matt Lam	(substituted in) 31'	(substituted off) 87'
MF	28	(Hong Kong) Xu Deshuai	(substituted in) 52'
MF	30	(Hong Kong) Cheng Chin Lung
Coach:
(Spain) Àlex Gómez

GK	40	(England) Ben Amos
RB	22	(Brazil) Fabio	(substituted off) 72'
CB	12	(England) Chris Smalling
CB	38	(England) Michael Keane
LB	3	(France) Patrice Evra (c)	(substituted off) 46'
DM	16	(England) Michael Carrick	(substituted off) 72'
CM	8	(Brazil) Anderson
CM	23	(England) Tom Cleverley
RW	25	(England) Wilfried Zaha	(substituted off) 81'
LW	18	(England) Ashley Young	(substituted off) 46'
CF	19	(England) Danny Welbeck	(substituted off) 46'
Substitutions:
GK	13	(Denmark) Anders Lindegaard
DF	2	(Brazil) Rafael	(substituted in) 72'
DF	4	(England) Phil Jones	(substituted in) 72'
DF	5	(England) Rio Ferdinand
MF	11	(Wales) Ryan Giggs
FW	20	(Netherlands) Robin van Persie	(substituted in) 81'
DF	28	(Netherlands) Alexander Büttner	(substituted in) 46'
MF	35	(England) Jesse Lingard	(substituted in) 46'
MF	44	(Belgium) Adnan Januzaj	(substituted in) 46'
Coach:
(Scotland) David Moyes

=== Premier League Asia Trophy ===
24 July 2013 Semi-finals	Manchester City (England)	1–0	(Hong Kong) South China	So Kon Po, Hong Kong
20:30 UTC+8	Džeko 21'	Report		Stadium: Hong Kong Stadium; Attendance: 35,950; Referee: Anthony Taylor (England)

27 July 2013 3rd Place Playoff	Tottenham Hotspur (England)	6–0	(Hong Kong) South China	So Kon Po, Hong Kong
18:00 UTC+8	Tse 12' (o.g.); Dempsey 34'; Defoe 45', 54', 80'; Townsend 86'			Stadium: Hong Kong Stadium; Attendance: 39,544; Referee: Anthony Taylor (England)

Match detail

GK	25	(France) Hugo Lloris
RB	28	(England) Kyle Walker	(substituted off) 46'
CB	20	(England) Michael Dawson (c)
CB	33	(England) Steven Caulker
LB	3	(England) Danny Rose	(substituted off) 70'
DM	8	(England) Scott Parker	(substituted off) 70'
AM	19	(Belgium) Mousa Dembélé	(substituted off) 70'
AM	22	(Iceland) Gylfi Sigurðsson
RM	7	(England) Aaron Lennon	(substituted off) 70'
LM	2	(United States) Clint Dempsey	(substituted off) 46'
CF	18	(England) Jermain Defoe
Substitutes:
GK	1	(Brazil) Heurelho Gomes
MF	6	(England) Tom Huddlestone	(substituted in) 70'
DF	16	(England) Kyle Naughton	(substituted in) 46'
GK	24	(United States) Brad Friedel
MF	29	(England) Jake Livermore	(substituted in) 70'
MF	31	(England) Andros Townsend	(substituted in) 70'
DF	32	(Cameroon) Benoît Assou-Ekotto
DF	35	(England) Zeki Fryers	(substituted in) 70'
MF	46	(England) Tom Carroll	(substituted in) 46'
Coach:
(Portugal) André Villas-Boas

GK	28	(Hong Kong) Zhang Chunhui
RB	22	(Hong Kong) Jack Sealy
CB	4	(Hong Kong) Sean Tse
CB	30	(Brazil) Joel Bertoti Padilha	(substituted off) 46'
LB	18	(Hong Kong) Kwok Kin Pong (c)	(substituted off) 82'
DM	8	(Brazil) Ticão
DM	11	(Brazil) Aender Naves Mesquita	(substituted off) 82'
CM	23	(Hong Kong) Luk Michael Chi Ho	(substituted off) 61'
RM	24	(Hong Kong) Lo Kong Wai	(substituted off) 46'
LW	19	(Hong Kong) Dhiego de Souza Martins
CF	29	(Guinea) Mamadou Barry	(substituted off) 73'
Substitutions:
GK	1	(Hong Kong) Tsang Man Fai
DF	5	(Hong Kong) Chak Ting Fung
DF	6	(Australia) Jovo Pavlović	(substituted in) 46'
MF	9	(Hong Kong) Lee Wai Lim	(substituted in) 73'
MF	10	(Brazil) João Emir Porto Pereira	(substituted in) 82'
DF	15	(Hong Kong) Chan Wai Ho
MF	16	(Hong Kong) Chan Siu Kwan	(substituted in) 82'
MF	17	(Hong Kong) Lee Hong Lim	(substituted in) 61'
DF	20	(Australia) Liu Stephen Garlock	(substituted in) 46'
GK	25	(Hong Kong) Tin Man Ho
FW	31	(Hong Kong) Cheng Lai Hin
GK	33	(Hong Kong) Yapp Hung Fai
MF	36	(Hong Kong) Kouta Jige
Coach:
(Hong Kong) Cheung Po Chun
