= Shing Mun Valley Sports Ground =

Sports ground in Tsuen Wan, Hong Kong

Coordinates: 22.376414°N 114.128149°E

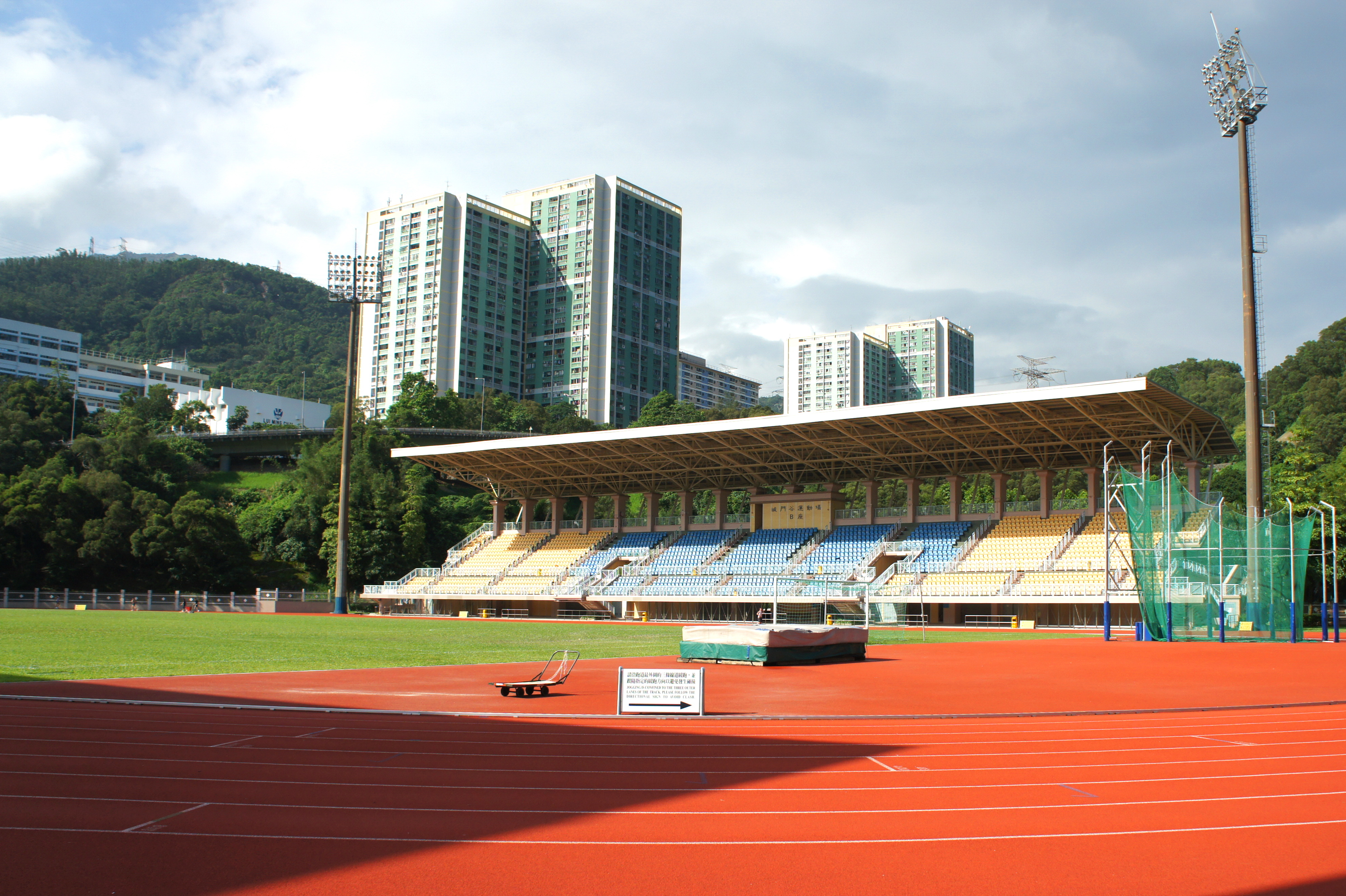
- Shing Mun Valley Sports Ground
- Interactive map of Shing Mun Valley Sports Ground
- Location: 21 Shing Mun Road, Tsuen Wan, Hong Kong
- Owner: Leisure and Cultural Services Department
- Operator: Leisure and Cultural Services Department
- Capacity: 5,000
- Surface: Grass

Construction
- Opened: 1 August 1998; 28 years ago

Tenant
- Eastern Salon (2013–)

Shing Mun Valley Sports Ground (Chinese: 城門谷運動場) is a sports ground located in Tsuen Wan, New Territories, Hong Kong. It consists of a Tartan track and a football pitch. It replaces Tsuen Wan Sports Ground as the only sports ground in Tsuen Wan after Tsuen Wan Sports Ground was demolished.

The football pitch hosts Hong Kong First Division League club Eastern Salon's home match starting in the 2013–14 Hong Kong First Division League.

== See also ==
- Shing Mun Valley
