= Kwai Chung Sports Ground =

Sports venue in Kwai Fong, Hong Kong

Coordinates: 22°21′29″N 114°07′31″E

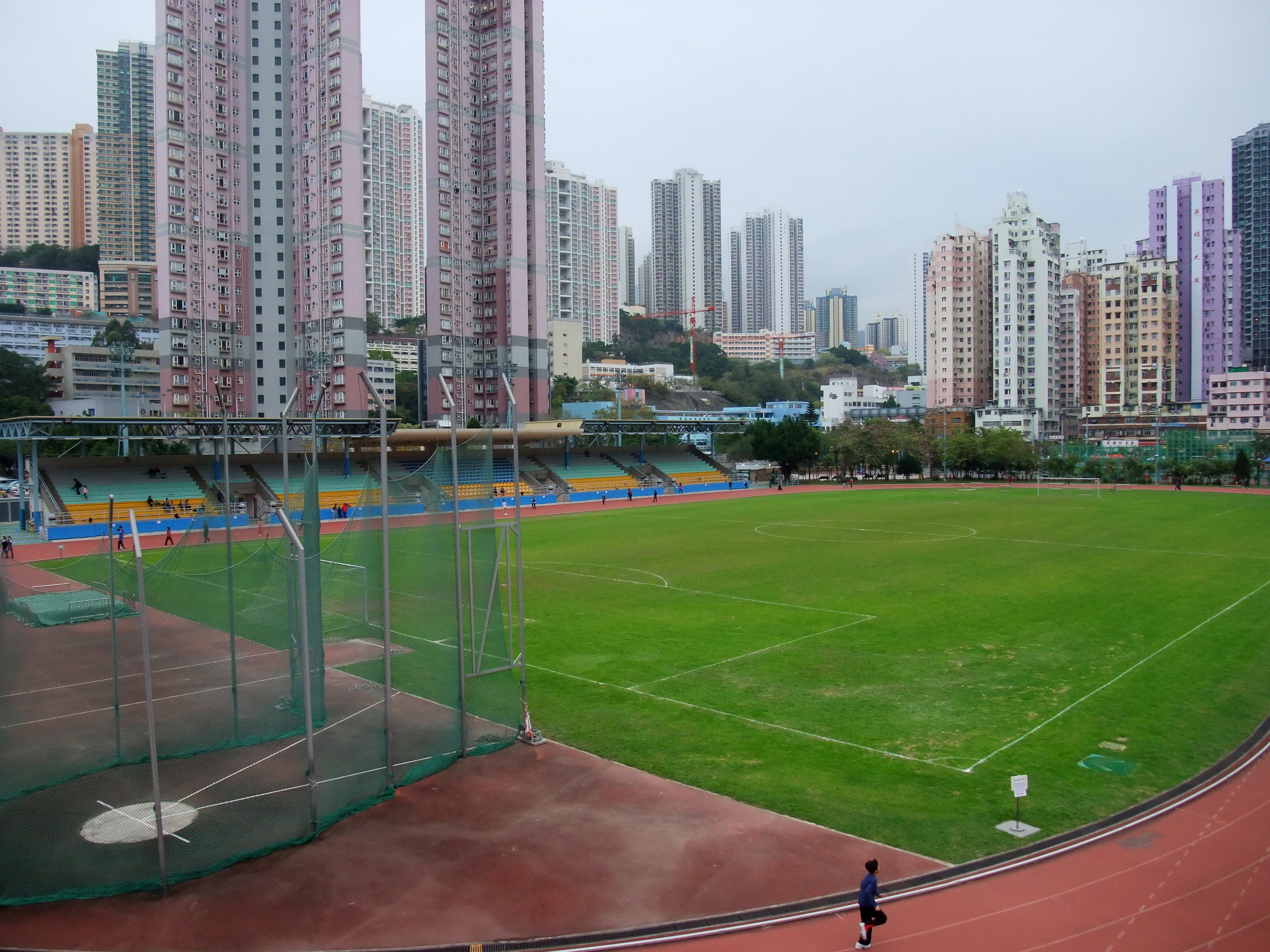
- Main pitch and running track

- Location within Hong Kong
- Location: 93 Hing Shing Road; Kwai Chung, New Territories
- Operator: Leisure and Cultural Services Department
- Capacity: 1,500
- Surface: Grass
- Scoreboard: Yes
- Public transit: Kwai Fong station

Construction
- Opened: 2 December 1978; 47 years ago

Tenant
- Kwai Tsing District FC

Kwai Chung Sports Ground
- Traditional Chinese: 葵涌運動場
- Simplified Chinese: 葵涌运动场
Transcriptions
Standard Mandarin
- Hanyu Pinyin: Kuíchōng Yùndòngchǎng
Yue: Cantonese
- Jyutping: kwai4 cung1 wan6 dung6 coeng4

Kwai Chung Sports Ground (Chinese: 葵涌運動場) is one of the major sports grounds in the Kwai Tsing District, located in Kwai Fong, Hong Kong. It opened in 1978.

It provides facilities for track and field and football. It is the first such ground constructed with tartan track in the district. It has a covered grandstand. It is located alongside Hing Fong Road (興芳路), opposite to the Metroplaza.

The sports ground is mainly used for school sports days and Hong Kong Second Division League games.

== History ==
The sports ground was built by the Hong Kong government as part of the Tsuen Wan New Town development project. The site of the sports ground, once part of Gin Drinkers Bay, was reclaimed in the late 1960s. The complex cost around HK$4.7 million, and initially included a full-size football pitch, two mini-pitches, two basketball courts, an eight-lane running track, and a 1,500-seat spectator stand with a canteen. It was officially opened by legislative councillor Oswald Cheung on 2 December 1978.

On 1 January 2000, management of the sports ground was transferred from the Regional Council to the newly formed Leisure and Cultural Services Department.

== Features ==
The natural turf pitch is surrounded by an eight-lane, 400-metre running track which is regularly open for public use. The 1,500-seat spectator stand is covered, and has 261 plastic seats and 1,239 concrete seats.

Aside from the main pitch, the sports ground complex also includes two hard-surfaced mini football pitches, three basketball courts, a gateball court, a beach volleyball cum handball court, and sitting-out areas.

== Transport ==
The sports ground is a five-minute walk from Kwai Fong MTR station. It is also adjacent to bus stops served by minibuses and Kowloon Motor Bus.
