= Sai Kung Tang Shiu Kin Sports Ground =

Sports venue in Hong Kong

Coordinates: 22.3835°N 114.2734°E

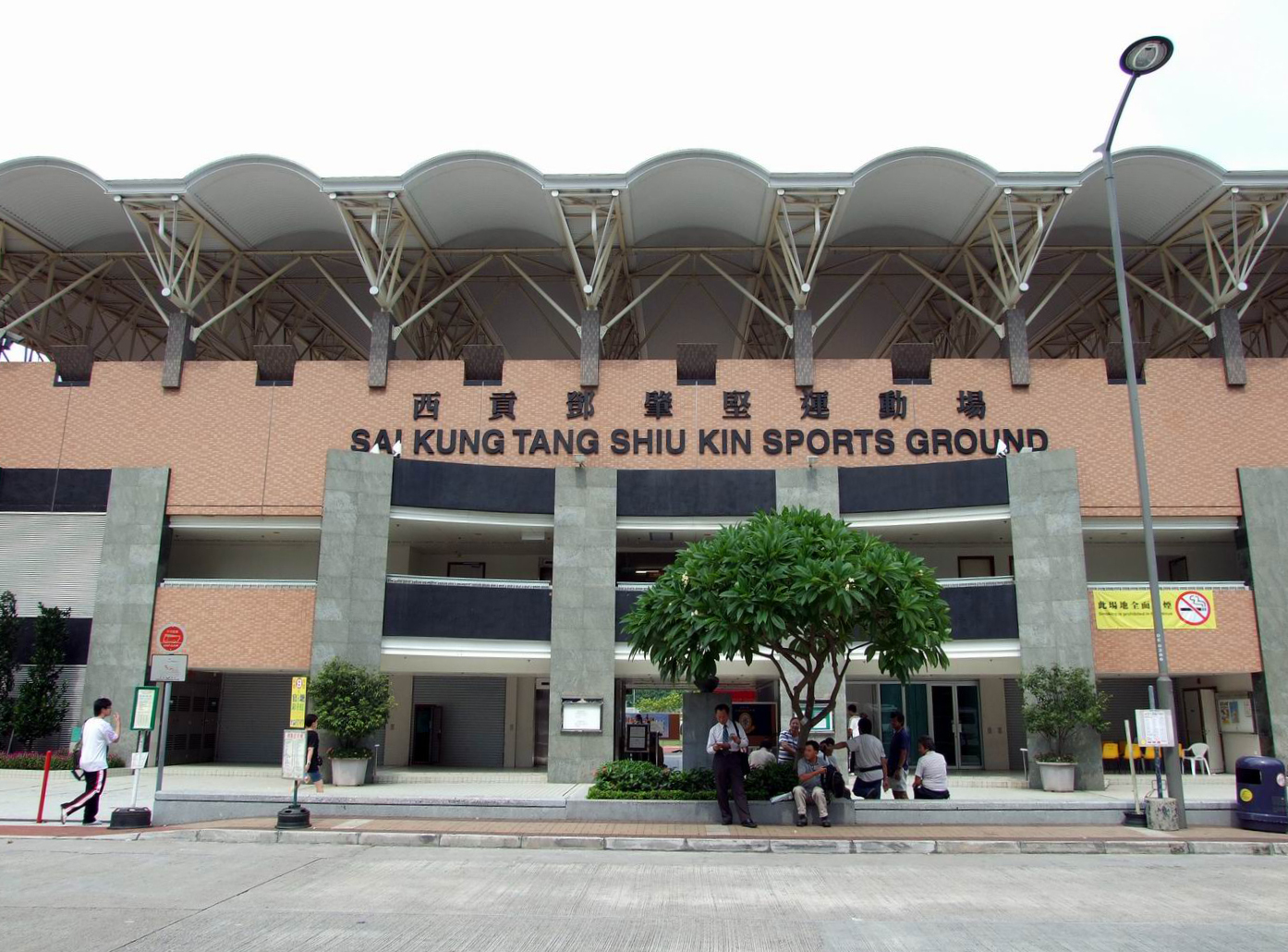
- Interactive map of Sai Kung Tang Shiu Kin Sports Ground
- Location: 41 Fuk Man Road, Sai Kung, New Territories, Hong Kong
- Operator: Leisure and Cultural Services Department
- Capacity: 1,500
- Surface: Grass
- Field size: 102 x 65 metres (111 x 71 yards)

Construction
- Opened: 27 May 1983; 43 years ago

Sai Kung Tang Shiu Kin Sports Ground is a rugby union stadium on Fuk Man Road, Sai Kung, New Territories, Hong Kong. It is managed by the Leisure and Cultural Services Department of the Hong Kong Government.

The sports ground includes a football field and a running track and holds 5,000 spectators. It is the home ground of Sai Kung Stingrays Rugby Club. The sports ground is located near the Sai Kung bus terminus.

== Facilities ==
- Covered grandstand
- Standard running track
- Natural grass football field
