= Martin Jančula =

Slovak footballer

Personal information
- Date of birth: 26 February 1975 (age 51)
- Place of birth: Czechoslovakia

Senior career*
Years	Team	Apps	(Gls)
–2001	ŠK Slovan Bratislava		
1999	→ FC Senec (loan)		
2001	Instant-Dict		
2001–2002	South China		
2002–?	Happy Valley		
2004–2005	Kitchee		
2005–?	ŠK Slovan Bratislava		
- * Club domestic league appearances and goals

Martin Jančula (甄馬田, born 26 February 1975) is a former Slovak footballer who played as a midfielder. He played in Slovakia for ŠK Slovan Bratislava and spent time on loan at FC Senec in 1999. He played football in Hong Kong for numerous clubs, before returning to Slovakia in 2005.

== Career ==
Jančula played in Slovakia for ŠK Slovan Bratislava and spent time on loan at FC Senec in 1999.

Jančula joined Hong Kong side Instant-Dict in April 2001. He scored four goals on his debut in an 11–1 FA Cup victory against Rangers. He scored 10 goals in his three months at the club, which won the FA Cup and finished second in the league.

Jančula was signed by South China from ŠK Slovan Bratislava in October 2001. On 29 November 2001, during an Asian Cup Winners' Cup match, he scored a hat-trick against Japanese side Shimizu S-Pulse, with his goals coming in the 9th, 54th and 59th minutes, as he sent a crowd of 10,343 spectators into raptures with a fine display. He left South China in 2002 after the expiry of his contract and joined Happy Valley, where he formed a partnership with Kittitian striker Keith Gumbs. Jančula scored in the opening round of the 2003–04 season, a 4–2 win against Sun Hei. He later played for Kitchee, scoring in a 4–2 away defeat to Buler Rangers in October 2004.

Jančula returned to Slovakia from Hong Kong in 2005, signing to play for Slovan Bratislava in the winter break of the 2004–05 2. Liga (Slovakia). He was unavailable for selection after signing for the club due to recovery from surgery on a knee injury.

== Personal life ==
His wife Katarína is a model.
