= Fire Services (football club) =

Five Services
- Full name: HK Fire Services Sports and Welfare Club
- Dissolved: 2015
- League: Hong Kong Second Division
- 2014–15: Second Division, 11th
Home colours	Away colours

Fire Services (Chinese: 消防) was a Hong Kong football team. The majority of the players are working for the Hong Kong Fire Services Department and playing for the club on an amateur basis. The club was dissolved after the 2014–15 season.

== Honours ==
- Hong Kong Viceroy Cup
  - Runners-up (1): 1969–70
