= 2015–16 Kitchee SC season =

Kitchee
2015–16 season
- General Manager: Ken Ng
- Head Coach: Abraham García
- Home Ground: Mong Kok Stadium (Capacity: 6,680)
- Premier League: 2nd
- Senior Shield: TBC
- FA Cup: TBC
Home colours	Away colours

The 2015–16 season is Kitchee's 37th season in the top-tier division in Hong Kong football. Kitchee will compete in the Premier League, Senior Challenge Shield, FA Cup and 2015 AFC Cup in this season.

== Key events ==
- 1 June 2015: The club extends a 2-year contract with club captain Lo Kwan Yee.
- 4 June 2015: Hong Kong defender Tong Kin Man joins the club from Sun Pegasus on a free transfer. Brazilian midfielder Fernando Augusto Azevedo joins the club from YFCMD for an undisclosed fee.
- 12 June 2015: Hong Kong midfielder Xu Deshuai leaves the club and joins Eastern for an undisclosed fee.
- 16 June 2015: Hong Kong defender Cheung Kin Fung leaves the club and joins South China on a free transfer.
- 4 July 2015: Spanish striker Borja Rubiato leaves the club and joins Talavera CF on a free transfer.
- 8 July 2015: Hong Kong defender Tsang Chi Hau leaves the club and joins Eastern for an undisclosed fee.
- 9 July 2015: Hong Kong defender Tsang Kam To leaves the club and joins Eastern for an undisclosed fee.
- 13 July 2015: Hong Kong midfielder Emmet Wan, Ho Chuck Hang and defender Wang Hecun join KC Southern on loan until the end of the season.
- 15 July 2015: Hong Kong striker Sham Kwok Keung joins the club from Sun Pegasus on a free transfer. On the other hand, Brazil-born Hong Kong striker Alessandro Leonardo joins the club from Wong Tai Sin on a free transfer.
- 15 July 2015: Ngan Chuck Ban, Cheng Chin Lung, Harima Hirokane and Law Tsz Chun are promoted from the youth system.
- 23 July 2015: Hong Kong midfielder To Hon To leaves the club and joins Wong Tai Sin for an undisclosed fee.
- 23 July 2015: Hong Kong defender Yu Wai Lim leaves the club and joins Tai Po on a free transfer.
- 27 July 2015: Hong Kong midfielder Lee Kai Chi leaves the club and joins Yuen Long on a free transfer.
- 1 August 2015: Hong Kong midfielder Cho Sung-min leaves the club and joins Citizen on a free transfer.

== Players ==
=== Squad information ===
N	P	Nat.	Name	Date of birth	Age	Since	Previous club	Notes
1	GK	(Hong Kong)	Wang Zhenpeng^{LP}	5 May 1984	31	2005	(China) Dalian Shide	Second nationality: China
2	DF	(Spain)	Fernando Recio^{FP}	22 December 1982	32	2010	(Spain) Tortosa	
3	DF	(Spain)	Dani Cancela^{FP}	23 September 1981	33	2010	(Spain) Lugo	
5	DF	(Brazil)	Hélio José de Souza Gonçalves^{LP}	31 January 1986	29	2014	(Hong Kong) Citizen	
6	MF	(Hong Kong)	Gao Wen^{LP}	18 January 1985	29	2006	(China) Shanghai Shenhua	Second nationality: China
7	MF	(Brazil)	Fernando^{FP}	14 November 1986	29	2015	(Hong Kong) Citizen	
8	FW	(Nigeria)	Alex Tayo Akande^{LP}	9 February 1989	26	2013	(Hong Kong) Wofoo Tai Po	
9	FW	(Spain)	Juan Belencoso^{FP}	1 September 1981	33	2013	(Spain) Cádiz	
10	MF	(Hong Kong)	Lam Ka Wai^{LP}	5 June 1985	30	2008	(Hong Kong) Bulova Rangers	Team 2nd vice captain
11	FW	(Brazil)	Sandro^{LP}	10 March 1987	28	2015	(Hong Kong) Wong Tai Sin	
12	DF	(Hong Kong)	Lo Kwan Yee^{LP}	9 October 1984	30	2007	(Hong Kong) Rangers	Team 1st vice captain
13	DF	(Hong Kong)	Li Ngai Hoi^{LP}	15 October 1994	20	2008	Youth system	
14	MF	(Hong Kong)	Cheung Kwok Ming^{LP}	23 December 1990	24	2014	(Hong Kong) Sunray Cave JC Sun Hei	
15	FW	(Hong Kong)	Christian Annan^{LP}	3 May 1978	37	2013	(Hong Kong) Wofoo Tai Po	Second nationality: Hong Kong
17	MF	(Brazil)	Paulinho Piracicaba^{LP}	16 January 1983	32	2014	(Hong Kong) Citizen	
18	FW	(Spain)	Jordi Tarrés^{FP}	16 March 1981	34	2010	(Spain) Hospitalet	
19	MF	(Hong Kong)	Huang Yang^{LP}	19 October 1983	31	201	Free agent	Second nationality: China
20	MF	(Canada)	Matt Lam^{LP}	10 September 1989	25	2013 (Winter)	(Canada) FC Edmonton	Second nationality: Hong Kong
21	DF	(Hong Kong)	Tong Kin Man^{LP}	10 January 1985	30	2015	(Hong Kong) Sun Pegasus	
22	MF	(Hong Kong)	Emmet Wan^{NR}	13 March 1993	22	2014 (Winter)	Free agent	Second nationality: Republic of Ireland; On loan to KC Southern
23	GK	(Hong Kong)	Guo Jianqiao^{LP}	20 July 1983	32	2011	(Hong Kong) Tai Chung	Second nationality: Hong Kong
24	MF	(Hong Kong)	Ngan Chuck Ban^{LP}	23 January 1998	17	2011	Youth system	
26	DF	(Hong Kong)	Wang Hecun^{NR}	26 December 1996	19	2013	Youth system	On loan to KC Southern
27	GK	(Hong Kong)	Chan Ka Ho^{LP}	27 January 1996	19	2012	Youth system	
28	MF	(Hong Kong)	Cheng Chin Lung^{LP}	18 January 1998	17	2013	Youth system	
29	FW	(Hong Kong)	Harima Hirokane^{LP}	31 January 1998	17	2013	Youth system	Second nationality: Japan
30	DF	(Hong Kong)	Leung Robson Augusto Ka Hai^{LP}	22 April 1993	22	2008	Youth system	Second nationality: Brazil; On loan to KC Southern
31	DF	(Hong Kong)	Law Tsz Chun^{LP}	22 March 1997	18	2011	Youth system	
33	FW	(Hong Kong)	Sham Kwok Keung^{LP}	10 September 1985	29	2015	(Hong Kong) Sun Pegasus	
38	MF	(Hong Kong)	Ngan Lok Fung^{LP}	26 January 1993	22	2008	Youth system	
44	DF	(South Korea)	Kim Tae-Min^{FP}	25 May 1982	33	2014	(Thailand) Police United F.C.	
	MF	(Hong Kong)	Ho Chuck Hang^{NR}	May 1997	18	2013	Youth system	On loan to KC Southern

Last update: 28 July 2015
Source: South China Football Team
Ordered by squad number.
^{LP}Local player; ^{FP}Foreign player; ^{NR}Non-registered player

== Transfers ==
=== In ===
==== Summer ====
No.	Pos	Player	Transferred from	Fee	Date	Source
7	MF	(Brazil) Fernando	(Hong Kong) YFCMD	Undisclosed	4 June 2015	
21	DF	(Hong Kong) Tong Kin Man	(Hong Kong) Sun Pegasus	Free transfer	4 June 2015	
11	FW	(Hong Kong) Sandro	(Hong Kong) Wong Tai Sin	Free transfer	15 July 2015	
33	FW	(Hong Kong) Sham Kwok Keung	(Hong Kong) Sun Pegasus	Free transfer	15 July 2015	
24	MF	(Hong Kong) Ngan Chuck Ban	Youth system	N/A	15 July 2015	
28	MF	(Hong Kong) Cheng Chin Lung	Youth system	N/A	15 July 2015	
29	FW	(Hong Kong) Harima Hirokane	Youth system	N/A	15 July 2015	
31	DF	(Hong Kong) Law Tsz Chun	Youth system	N/A	15 July 2015	

=== Out ===
==== Summer ====
No.	Pos	Player	Transferred to	Fee	Date	Source
7	MF	(Hong Kong) Xu Deshuai	(Hong Kong) Eastern	Undisclosed	12 June 2015	
13	DF	(Hong Kong) Cheung Kin Fung	(Hong Kong) South China	Free transfer	16 June 2015	
88	FW	(Spain) Borja Rubiato	(Spain) Talavera CF	Free transfer	4 July 2015	
16	DF	(Hong Kong) Tsang Chi Hau	(Hong Kong) Eastern	Undisclosed	8 July 2015	
21	DF	(Hong Kong) Tsang Kam To	(Hong Kong) Eastern	Undisclosed	9 July 2015	
11	MF	(Hong Kong) To Hon To	(Hong Kong) Wong Tai Sin	Undisclosed	23 July 2015	
	DF	(Hong Kong) Yu Wai Lim	(Hong Kong) Tai Po	Free transfer	23 July 2015	
	MF	(Hong Kong) Lee Kai Chi	(Hong Kong) Yuen Long	Free transfer	27 July 2015	
24	MF	(Hong Kong) Cho Sung-min	(Hong Kong) Citizen	Free transfer	1 August 2015	

=== Loan in ===
==== Summer ====
No.	Pos	Player	Loaned from	Start	End	Source

=== Loan out ===
==== Summer ====
No.	Pos	Player	Loaned to	Start	End	Source

== Club ==
=== Coaching staff ===
Position	Staff
Head Coach	(Spain) Abraham García
Goalkeeper Coach	(Hong Kong) Tung Ho Yin

Last updated: 18 July 2015
Source: Southern District RSA

== Squad statistics ==
=== Overall stats ===
	League	Senior Shield	FA Cup	Total stats
Games played	0	0	0	0
Games won	0	0	0	0
Games drawn	0	0	0	0
Games lost	0	0	0	0
Goals for	0	0	0	0
Goals against	0	0	0	0
Players used	0	0	0	0
Yellow cards	0	0	0	0
Red cards	0	0	0	0

Last updated: 25 July 2015
Source: Squad Stats

=== Appearances and goals ===
Key

No. = Squad number

Pos. = Playing position

Nat. = Nationality

Apps = Appearances

GK = Goalkeeper

DF = Defender

MF = Midfielder

FW = Forward

Numbers in parentheses denote appearances as substitute. Players with number struck through and marked † left the club during the playing season.

As of 25 July 2015

No.	Pos.	Nat.	Name	Premier League		Senior Shield		FA Cup		League Cup		AFC Cup		Total	
No.	Pos.	Nat.	Name	Apps	Goals	Apps	Goals	Apps	Goals	Apps	Goals	Apps	Goals	Apps	Goals
1	GK	HKG	Wang Zhenpeng	0	0	0	0	0	0	0	0	0	0	0	0
2	DF	ESP	Fernando Recio	0	0	0	0	0	0	0	0	0	0	0	0
3	DF	ESP	Dani Cancela	0	0	0	0	0	0	0	0	0	0	0	0
5	DF	BRA	Hélio José de Souza Gonçalves	0	0	0	0	0	0	0	0	0	0	0	0
6	MF	HKG	Gao Wen	0	0	0	0	0	0	0	0	0	0	0	0
7	MF	BRA	Fernando Augusto Azevedo	0	0	0	0	0	0	0	0	0	0	0	0
8	FW	NIG	Alex Tayo Akande	0	0	0	0	0	0	0	0	0	0	0	0
9	FW	ESP	Juan Belencoso	0	0	0	0	0	0	0	0	0	0	0	0
10	MF	HKG	Lam Ka Wai	0	0	0	0	0	0	0	0	0	0	0	0
11	FW	BRA	Alessandro Leonardo	0	0	0	0	0	0	0	0	0	0	0	0
12	DF	HKG	Lo Kwan Yee	0	0	0	0	0	0	0	0	0	0	0	0
13	DF	HKG	Li Ngai Hoi	0	0	0	0	0	0	0	0	0	0	0	0
14	MF	HKG	Cheung Kwok Ming	0	0	0	0	0	0	0	0	0	0	0	0
15	FW	HKG	Christian Annan	0	0	0	0	0	0	0	0	0	0	0	0
17	MF	BRA	Paulinho Piracicaba	0	0	0	0	0	0	0	0	0	0	0	0
18	FW	ESP	Jordi Tarrés	0	0	0	0	0	0	0	0	0	0	0	0
19	MF	HKG	Huang Yang	0	0	0	0	0	0	0	0	0	0	0	0
20	MF	CAN	Matt Lam	0	0	0	0	0	0	0	0	0	0	0	0
21	DF	HKG	Tong Kin Man	0	0	0	0	0	0	0	0	0	0	0	0
23	GK	HKG	Guo Jianqiao	0	0	0	0	0	0	0	0	0	0	0	0
24	MF	HKG	Ngan Chuck Ban	0	0	0	0	0	0	0	0	0	0	0	0
26	DF	HKG	Wang Hecun	0	0	0	0	0	0	0	0	0	0	0	0
27	GK	HKG	Chan Ka Ho	0	0	0	0	0	0	0	0	0	0	0	0
28	MF	HKG	Cheng Chin Lung	0	0	0	0	0	0	0	0	0	0	0	0
29	FW	HKG	Harima Hirokane	0	0	0	0	0	0	0	0	0	0	0	0
30	DF	HKG	Leung Robson Augusto Ka Hai	0	0	0	0	0	0	0	0	0	0	0	0
31	DF	HKG	Law Tsz Chun	0	0	0	0	0	0	0	0	0	0	0	0
33	FW	HKG	Sham Kwok Keung	0	0	0	0	0	0	0	0	0	0	0	0
38	MF	HKG	Ngan Lok Fung	0	0	0	0	0	0	0	0	0	0	0	0
44	DF	KOR	Kim Tae-Min	0	0	0	0	0	0	0	0	0	0	0	0

=== Top scorers ===
Last updated: 25 July 2015.
Source: Hong Kong Football Association

The list is sorted by shirt number when total goals are equal.

Rnk	Pos	No.	Player	Premier League	Senior Shield	FA Cup	Total
Own goals							
TOTALS							

=== Disciplinary record ===
Includes all competitive matches.Players listed below made at least one appearance for Southern first squad during the season.

N	P	Nat.	Name	League			Shield			FA Cup			Others			Total			Notes
N	P	Nat.	Name	Yellow card	Second yellow card	Red card	Yellow card	Second yellow card	Red card	Yellow card	Second yellow card	Red card	Yellow card	Second yellow card	Red card	Yellow card	Second yellow card	Red card	Notes

Last updated: 25 July 2015
Source: Competitive matches
Ordered by (red card) , (second yellow card) and (yellow card)
(yellow card) = Number of bookings; (second yellow card) = Number of sending offs after a second yellow card; (red card) = Number of sending offs by a direct red card.

=== Substitution record ===
Includes all competitive matches.

			League		Shield		FA Cup		Others		Total	
No.	Pos	Name	subson	subsoff	subson	subsoff	subson	subsoff	subson	subsoff	subson	subsoff
Goalkeepers
1	GK	Wang Zhenpeng	0	0	0	0	0	0	0	0	0	0
23	GK	Guo Jianqiao	0	0	0	0	0	0	0	0	0	0
27	GK	Chan Ka Ho	0	0	0	0	0	0	0	0	0	0
Defenders
2	CB	Fernando Recio	0	0	0	0	0	0	0	0	0	0
3	LB	Dani Cancela	0	0	0	0	0	0	0	0	0	0
5	CB	Hélio José de Souza Gonçalves	0	0	0	0	0	0	0	0	0	0
12	RB	Lo Kwan Yee	0	0	0	0	0	0	0	0	0	0
13	LB	Li Ngai Hoi	0	0	0	0	0	0	0	0	0	0
21	RB	Tong Kin Man	0	0	0	0	0	0	0	0	0	0
26	LB	Wang Hecun	0	0	0	0	0	0	0	0	0	0
30	RB	Leung Robson Augusto Ka Hai	0	0	0	0	0	0	0	0	0	0
31	CB	Law Tsz Chun	0	0	0	0	0	0	0	0	0	0
44	CB	Kim Tae-Min	0	0	0	0	0	0	0	0	0	0
Midfielders
6	DM	Gao Wen	0	0	0	0	0	0	0	0	0	0
7	AM	Fernando Augusto Azevedo	0	0	0	0	0	0	0	0	0	0
10	AM	Lam Ka Wai	0	0	0	0	0	0	0	0	0	0
14	LM	Cheung Kwok Ming	0	0	0	0	0	0	0	0	0	0
17	AM	Paulinho Piracicaba	0	0	0	0	0	0	0	0	0	0
19	DM	Huang Yang	0	0	0	0	0	0	0	0	0	0
20	CM	Matt Lam	0	0	0	0	0	0	0	0	0	0
24	CM	Ngan Chuck Ban	0	0	0	0	0	0	0	0	0	0
28	RM	Cheng Chin Lung	0	0	0	0	0	0	0	0	0	0
38	AM	Ngan Lok Fung	0	0	0	0	0	0	0	0	0	0
Forwards
8	CF	Alex Tayo Akande	0	0	0	0	0	0	0	0	0	0
9	CF	Juan Belencoso	0	0	0	0	0	0	0	0	0	0
11	CF	Alessandro Leonardo	0	0	0	0	0	0	0	0	0	0
15	CF	Christian Annan	0	0	0	0	0	0	0	0	0	0
18	CF	Jordi Tarrés	0	0	0	0	0	0	0	0	0	0
29	CF	Harima Hirokane	0	0	0	0	0	0	0	0	0	0
33	CF	Sham Kwok Keung	0	0	0	0	0	0	0	0	0	0

Last updated: 25 July 2015

=== Captains ===
No.	P	Name	Country	No. games	Notes

Last updated: 25 July 2015
Source: Competitive match reports.
Competitive matches only
Matches started as captain only
Country: FIFA nationality; No.: Squad number; P: Position; Name: Player name; No. Games: Number of games started as captain.

== Competitions ==
=== Overall ===
Competition	Started round	Current position / round	Final position / round	First match	Last match
Hong Kong Premier League	—	5th		12 September 2015	
Senior Shield	—	—			
FA Cup	—	—			

Updated to match played 25 July 2015
Source: Competitions

=== Premier League ===
==== Classification ====
Pos	Team	Pld	W	D	L	GF	GA	GD	Pts	Qualification or relegation
1	Eastern	16	12	2	2	35	13	+22	38	Qualification to Champions League group stage
2	Kitchee	16	11	4	1	32	11	+21	37	Qualification to season play-off and Champions League preliminary round 2
3	South China	16	9	2	5	26	21	+5	29	Qualification to season play-off (Note: Since the winners of the Senior Shield, Eastern, and the winners of the League Cup, Kitchee, qualified for AFC competitions and the Season Play-off respectively based on league position, the spots awarded to the Senior Shield winner and the League Cup winner for the Season Play-off were awarded to the third and fourth placed team in the league. Pegasus qualified as winners of the FA Cup.)
4	Southern	16	6	5	5	26	21	+5	23	Qualification to season play-off
5	Pegasus	16	4	5	7	22	27	−5	17	Qualification to season play-off

Source: Hong Kong Football Association
Rules for classification: 1) Points; 2) Head-to-head points; 3) Head-to-head goal difference; 4) Head-to-head goals scored; 5) Goal difference; 6) Goals scored; 7) Fair-play points; 8) Drawing lots (Play-off if the winner has to be decided)

==== Results summary ====
Overall								Home						Away					
Pld	W	D	L	GF	GA	GD	Pts	W	D	L	GF	GA	GD	W	D	L	GF	GA	GD
0	0	0	0	0	0	0	0	0	0	0	0	0	0	0	0	0	0	0	0

Last updated: 25 July 2015.
Source: Premier League
