= 2014–15 Kitchee SC season =

Kitchee SC
2014–15 season
- Chairman: Ken Ng
- Manager: José Molina
- Premier League: 1st
- Senior Shield: Runners-up
- FA Cup: Champions
- League Cup: Champions
- AFC Cup: Quarter-finals
- Top goalscorer: League: Juan Belencoso (13); All: Juan Belencoso (31)

The 2014–15 season was the 36th season of top-tier competitive association football played by Kitchee SC, a professional football club based in Mong Kok, Kowloon, Hong Kong. Their first-place finish in the Hong Kong Premier League meant it was their second successive championship in Hong Kong's top division, and seventh overall.

== Season overview ==
=== Pre-season ===
In May, following the conclusion of the 2013–14 season, chairman Ken Ng revealed that Kitchee would host French Champions Paris Saint-Germain on the 29th of July at the Hong Kong Stadium. At the press conference where this information was first revealed to the public, Ng detailed both clubs' ambitions with scheduling the friendly match, stating that Kitchee "would like to present the best football clubs to fans in Hong Kong every year and especially this year, following the World Cup. Paris Saint-Germain will be led by their world class star, Zlatan Ibrahimović, and the match against Kitchee will serve as Paris Saint-Germain’s final preparation before the team travel to Beijing for the French Super Cup.”

Paris Saint-Germain defeated Kitchee 6–2 in the July 29th friendly. Juan Belencoso headed in the opening goal at the five minute mark, but PSG's Hervin Ongenda equalized seven minutes later. Jean-Christophe Bahebeck and Zlatan Ibrahimović contributed to Paris Saint Germain's dominating performance with a brace and a hat-trick, respectively. Alex Tayo Akande netted a stoppage time goal on the counter attack to close the scoring.

== Squad ==
As of the end of the season

Note: Flags indicate national team as defined under FIFA eligibility rules; some limited exceptions apply. Players may hold more than one non-FIFA nationality.

| No. | Pos. | Nation | Player |
|---|---|---|---|
| 1 | GK | (Hong Kong) HKG | Wang Zhenpeng |
| 2 | DF | (Spain) ESP | Fernando Recio |
| 3 | DF | (Spain) ESP | Dani Cancela |
| 4 | DF | (Hong Kong) HKG | Chan Cham Hei |
| 5 | DF | (Brazil) BRA | Hélio |
| 6 | MF | (Hong Kong) HKG | Gao Wen |
| 7 | MF | (Hong Kong) HKG | Xu Deshuai |
| 8 | FW | (Nigeria) NGA | Alex Tayo Akande |
| 9 | FW | (Spain) ESP | Juan Belencoso |
| 10 | MF | (Hong Kong) HKG | Lam Ka Wai |
| 11 | MF | (Hong Kong) HKG | To Hon To |
| 12 | DF | (Hong Kong) HKG | Lo Kwan Yee |
| 13 | DF | (Hong Kong) HKG | Cheung Kin Fung |
| 14 | MF | (Hong Kong) HKG | Cheung Kwok Ming |
| 15 | MF | (Hong Kong) HKG | Christian Annan |

| No. | Pos. | Nation | Player |
|---|---|---|---|
| 16 | DF | (Hong Kong) HKG | Tsang Chi Hau |
| 17 | MF | (Brazil) BRA | Paulinho |
| 18 | FW | (Spain) ESP | Jordi Tarrés |
| 19 | MF | (Hong Kong) HKG | Huang Yang |
| 20 | MF | (Canada) CAN | Matt Lam |
| 21 | DF | (Hong Kong) HKG | Tsang Kam To |
| 22 | MF | (Hong Kong) HKG | Emmet Wan |
| 23 | GK | (China) CHN | Guo Jianqiao |
| 24 | MF | (South Korea) KOR | Cho Sung-Min |
| 26 | DF | (Hong Kong) HKG | Wang Hecun |
| 27 | GK | (Hong Kong) HKG | Chan Ka Ho |
| 30 | DF | (Hong Kong) HKG | Leung Ka Hai |
| 38 | MF | (Hong Kong) HKG | Ngan Lok Fung |
| 44 | MF | (South Korea) KOR | Kim Tae-min |
| 88 | FW | (Spain) ESP | Borja Rubiato |

== League table ==
| Pos | Team | Pld | W | D | L | GF | GA | GD | Pts | Qualification or relegation |
|---|---|---|---|---|---|---|---|---|---|---|
| 1 | Kitchee | 16 | 11 | 3 | 2 | 40 | 18 | +22 | 36 | Qualification to Champions League preliminary round 2 |
| 2 | Eastern | 16 | 10 | 3 | 3 | 34 | 20 | +14 | 33 | Qualification to season play-off (Note: As Kitchee won the FA Cup, Eastern finished 2nd in Premier League and won the Senior Challenge Shield, teams finishing 4th and 5th in Premier League entered the season play-off as well.) |
| 3 | Pegasus | 16 | 8 | 3 | 5 | 34 | 23 | +11 | 27 (Note: Pegasus wins head-to-head against South China.) | Qualification to season play-off |
| 4 | South China | 16 | 7 | 6 | 3 | 30 | 17 | +13 | 27 | Qualification to AFC Cup group stage (Note: As winners of the season play-off.) |
| 5 | YFCMD | 16 | 8 | 2 | 6 | 25 | 29 | −4 | 26 | Qualification to season play-off |

Source: Hong Kong Football Association
Rules for classification: 1) Points; 2) Head-to-head points; 3) Head-to-head goal difference; 4) Head-to-head goals scored; 5) Goal difference; 6) Goals scored; 7) Fair-play points; 8) Drawing lots (Play-off if the winner has to be decided)

== Match details ==
=== Key ===
Win Draw Loss

=== Premier League ===
| 12 September 2014 9 | Kitchee | 4–1 | Wofoo Tai Po | Mong Kok Stadium |
| 20:00 UTC+8 | Jordi 11'; Lam Ka Wai 58', 67'; Recio 86' | Report | Chen Jingde 87' | Attendance: 1,472 |

| 19 October 2014 5 | Kitchee | 2–1 | I-Sky Yuen Long | Mong Kok Stadium |
| 17:30 UTC+8 | Jordi 34'; Xu Deshuai 79' | Report | Cheng King Ho 17' | Attendance: 926 |

| 31 October 2014 6 | Kitchee | 2–1 | Biu Chun Rangers | Mong Kok Stadium |
| 20:00 UTC+8 | Jordi 69'; Belencoso 87' | Report | James Ha 86' | Attendance: 638 |

| 23 November 2014 7 | South China | 2–2 | Kitchee | Hong Kong Stadium |
| 14:30 UTC+8 | Leung Chun Pong 12'; Chan Wai Ho 51' | Report | Belencoso 71'; Lam Ka Wai 87' | Attendance: 2,289 |

| 6 December 2014 8 | Sun Pegasus | 0–1 | Kitchee | Mong Kok Stadium |
| 17:30 UTC+8 | | Report | Belencoso 17' | Attendance: 1,836 |

| 11 January 2015 10 | Kitchee | 2–2 | South China | Mong Kok Stadium |
| 17:30 UTC+8 | Belencoso 52', 58' | Report | Russell 24'; Awal 90+4' | Attendance: 3,523 |

| 24 January 2015 11 | Kitchee | 1–3 | Eastern | Mong Kok Stadium |
| 17:30 UTC+8 | Paulinho 45+2' | Report | Šarić 32'; Liang Zicheng 71'; Macallister 79' | Attendance: 2,416 |

| 28 January 2015 2 | Kitchee | 4–1 | YFCMD | Mong Kok Stadium |
| 20:00 UTC+8 | Xu Deshuai 11', 30'; Belencoso 22' (pen.); Paulinho 65' | Report | Hady Barry 90+1' | Attendance: 518 |

| 6 February 2015 3 | Kitchee | 1–0 | Wong Tai Sin | Mong Kok Stadium |
| 20:00 UTC+8 | Xu Deshuai 15' | Report | | Attendance: 634 |

| 28 February 2015 1 | Eastern | 0–4 | Kitchee | Tseung Kwan O Sports Ground |
| UTC+8 20:00 | | Report | Belencoso 25', 55' (pen.); Xu Deshuai 87'; Jordi 90+2' | Attendance: 1,639 |

| 7 March 2015 13 | Kitchee | 2–1 | Sun Pegasus | Mong Kok Stadium |
| 17:30 UTC+8 | Jordi 16' (pen.); Matt Lam 56' | Report | Raščić 60' | Attendance: 1,849 |

| 29 March 2015 14 | Biu Chun Rangers | 0–5 | Kitchee | Kowloon Bay Park |
| 15:00 UTC+8 | | Report | Jordi 23'; Matt Lam 41'; Xu Deshuai 64', 90'; Annan 83' | Attendance: 582 |

| 7 April 2015 12 | Wong Tai Sin | 0–2 | Kitchee | Hammer Hill Road Sports Ground |
| 14:30 UTC+8 | | Report | Lam Ka Wai 51'; Xu Deshuai 65' | Attendance: 941 |

| 19 April 2015 16 | I-Sky Yuen Long | 0–3 | Kitchee | Yuen Long Stadium |
| 17:30 UTC+8 | | Report | Jordi 3'; Belencoso 70', 90+2' | Attendance: 1,340 |

| 2 May 2015 17 | Wofoo Tai Po | 3–3 | Kitchee | Tai Po Sports Ground |
| 14:30 UTC+8 | Weijl 73', 88', 90+5' | Report | Belencoso 15', 86'; Paulinho 43' | Attendance: 1,063 |

| 9 May 2015 18 | YFCMD | 3–2 | Kitchee | Sham Shui Po Sports Ground |
| 14:30 UTC+8 | Tan Chun Lok 26'; Fong Pak Lun 64'; Fernando 90' (pen.) | Report | Belencoso 24'; Lo Kwan Yee 56' | Attendance: 606 |

=== Senior Shield ===
| 29 November 2014 Quarter-finals | Wofoo Tai Po | 2–3 | Kitchee | Tsing Yi Sports Ground |
| 14:30 UTC+8 | Lam Ngai Tong 6'; Chan Yuk Chi 50' | Report | Jordi 32' (pen.), 69'; Paulinho 61' | Attendance: 413 |

| 27 December 2014 Semi-finals | Wong Tai Sin | 0–3 | Kitchee | Mong Kok Stadium |
| 14:30 UTC+8 | | Report | Lam Ka Wai 27'; Jordi 68'; Belencoso 83' | Attendance: 1,283 |

| 17 January 2015 Final | Kitchee | 2–3 | Eastern | Hong Kong Stadium |
| 14:30 UTC+8 | Belencoso 38'; Jordi 90+3' | Report | Miroslav 11', 83'; Macallister 64' | Attendance: 6,133 |

=== FA Cup ===
| 11 April 2015 Quarter-finals | Kitchee | 3–1 | Wofoo Tai Po | Mong Kok Stadium |
| 14:30 (UTC+8) | Rubiato 42'; Emmet Wan 60'; Christian Annan 78' | Report | Aender 70' |

| 25 April 2015 Semi-finals | Kitchee | 0–0 (a.e.t.) (5–4 p) | YFCMD | Mong Kok Stadium |
| 15:00 (UTC+8) | | Report | | Attendance: 1,211 |
| | Penalties |
| | Belencoso (penalty scored); Paulinho (penalty scored); Emmet Wan (penalty scored); Jordi (penalty scored); Tsang Kam To (penalty scored) | | (penalty scored) Fong Pak Lun (penalty missed); (penalty scored) Díaz; (penalty scored) Moses; (penalty scored) Fernando |

| 17 May 2015 Final | Kitchee | 2–0 (a.e.t.) | Eastern | Mong Kok Stadium |
| 15:00 (UTC+8) | Belencoso 100', 116' | Report | | Attendance: 4,348 |

=== League Cup ===
| 28 October 2014 Group B | Wofoo Tai Po | 1–4 | Kitchee | Mong Kok Stadium |
| 20:00 UTC+8 | So Yau Tin 89' | Report | Belencoso 7', 56', 65', 90+2' | Attendance: 497 |

| 20 December 2014 Group B | Kitchee | 8–0 | Biu Chun Rangers | Kowloon Bay Park |
| 14:30 UTC+8 | Paulinho 10', 11'; Belencoso 30', 62', 67', 77'; Cheung Kwok Ming 74'; Annan 89' | Report | | Attendance: 470 |

| 22 March 2015 Semi-finals | Wong Tai Sin | 0–1 | Kitchee | Mong Kok Stadium |
| 17:30 UTC+8 | | Report | Lo Kwan Yee 37' | Attendance: 1,031 |

| 22 April 2015 Final | South China | 0–4 | Kitchee | Mong Kok Stadium |
| 20:00 UTC+8 | | Report | Paulinho 5', 12'; Belencoso 77'; Jordi 90+6' | Attendance: 5,082 |

=== AFC Cup ===
==== Group stage ====
| Pos | Team | Pld | W | D | L | GF | GA | GD | Pts | Qualification | JDT | KIT | EBG | BAL |
|---|---|---|---|---|---|---|---|---|---|---|---|---|---|---|
| 1 | (Malaysia) Johor Darul Ta'zim | 6 | 5 | 0 | 1 | 11 | 3 | +8 | 15 | Advance to knockout stage | — | 2–0 | 4–1 | 3–0 |
| 2 | (Hong Kong) Kitchee | 6 | 3 | 2 | 1 | 10 | 6 | +4 | 11 | Advance to knockout stage | 2–0 | — | 2–2 | 3–0 |
| 3 | (India) East Bengal | 6 | 1 | 2 | 3 | 8 | 10 | −2 | 5 | | 0–1 | 1–1 | — | 3–0 |
| 4 | (Singapore) Balestier Khalsa | 6 | 1 | 0 | 5 | 3 | 13 | −10 | 3 | | 0–1 | 1–2 | 2–1 | — |

Source: AFC
Rules for classification: Group stage tiebreakers

=== Pre–season and friendlies ===
| 29 July 2014 Friendly | Paris Saint-Germain | 6–2 | Kitchee | Hong Kong Stadium |
| 20:00 UTC+8 | Ongenda 12'; Bahebeck 22', 58'; Ibrahimović 25', 28', 74' | Report | Belencoso 5'; Akande 90' |
