= 2014–15 Hong Kong FA Cup final =

2014-15 Hong Kong FA Cup final
- Event: 2014–15 Hong Kong FA Cup
Kitchee	Eastern
2	0
- Date: 17 May 2015
- Venue: Mong Kok Stadium, Mong Kok
- Attendance: 4,348

The 2014–15 Hong Kong FA Cup final was a football match that took place on 17 May 2015 at Mong Kok Stadium, Hong Kong. It was the final match of the 2014–15 Hong Kong FA Cup, a football competition including teams in the Hong Kong Premier League.

== Details ==
17 May 2015
15:00 GMT+8

Kitchee	2-0	Eastern
Belencoso 100', 116'

Mong Kok Stadium, Mong Kok
Attendance: 4,348

Kitchee	Eastern

GK	1	(Hong Kong) Wang Zhenpeng
RB	12	(Hong Kong) Lo Kwan Yee (c)	(yellow card) 120'
CB	2	(Spain) Fernando Recio
CB	5	(Brazil) Hélio
LB	3	(Spain) Dani Cancela	(yellow card) 35'
RW	20	(Canada) Matt Lam		(substituted off) 119'
CM	19	(Hong Kong) Huang Yang
LW	17	(Brazil) Paulinho	(yellow card) 24'
CF	18	(Spain) Jordi Tarrés		(substituted off) 104'
CF	9	(Spain) Juan Belencoso
CF	7	(Hong Kong) Xu Deshuai		(substituted off) 89'
Substitutes:
GK	23	(Hong Kong) Guo Jianqiao
MF	10	(Hong Kong) Lam Ka Wai		(substituted on) 119'
DF	13	(Hong Kong) Cheung Kin Fung
CF	15	(Hong Kong) Christian Annan		(substituted on) 89'
MF	22	(Hong Kong) Emmet Wan Chun
FW	38	(Hong Kong) Ngan Lok Fung
DF	44	(South Korea) Kim Tae-min		(substituted on) 104'
Head Coach:
(Spain) José Francisco Molina

GK	1	(Hong Kong) Yapp Hung Fai (c)
RB	15	(Brazil) Roberto Orlando Affonso Júnior
CB	14	(Hong Kong) Lee Chi Ho	(yellow card) 47' (yellow-red card) 103'
CB	2	(Hong Kong) Jean-Jacques Kilama	(yellow card) 105'
LB	13	(Hong Kong) Tse Man Wing	(yellow card) 66'
DM	3	(Brazil) Diego Eli Moreira	(yellow card) 29'	(substituted off) 90+1'
DM	88	(Hong Kong) Andy Nägelein	(yellow card) 105'
CM	8	(Croatia) Miroslav Šarić	(yellow card) 49'	(substituted off) 90+1'
RW	22	(Brazil) Giovane Alves da Silva
LW	18	(China) Liang Zicheng	(yellow card) 45+4'	(substituted off) 107'
CF	19	(Spain) Dylan Macallister
Substitutes:
GK	17	(Hong Kong) Li Hon Ho
FW	7	(Brazil) Michel Lugo		(substituted on) 90+1'
MF	11	(England) Rohan Ricketts		(substituted on) 105+1'
MF	19	(Hong Kong) Cheng Siu Wai
DF	21	(Hong Kong) Kwok Kin Pong
DF	28	(Hong Kong) Wong Chi Chung		(substituted on) 107'
MF	32	(Hong Kong) Lo Chi Kwan
Head Coach:
(Spain) Cristiano Cordeiro

Match rules

- 90 minutes.
- 30 minutes of extra time if necessary.
- Penalty shoot-out if scores still level.
- Seven named substitutes, of which three may be used.

== See also ==
- The Hong Kong Football Association
- Hong Kong Premier League
