= Edgar Cardoso =

Edgar Cardoso may refer to:

- Edgar Cardoso (engineer) (1913–2000), Portuguese civil engineer and university professor
- Edgar Cardoso (football manager) (born 1983), Portuguese football manager
