= Hirokane Harima =

Hong Kong footballer (born 1998)

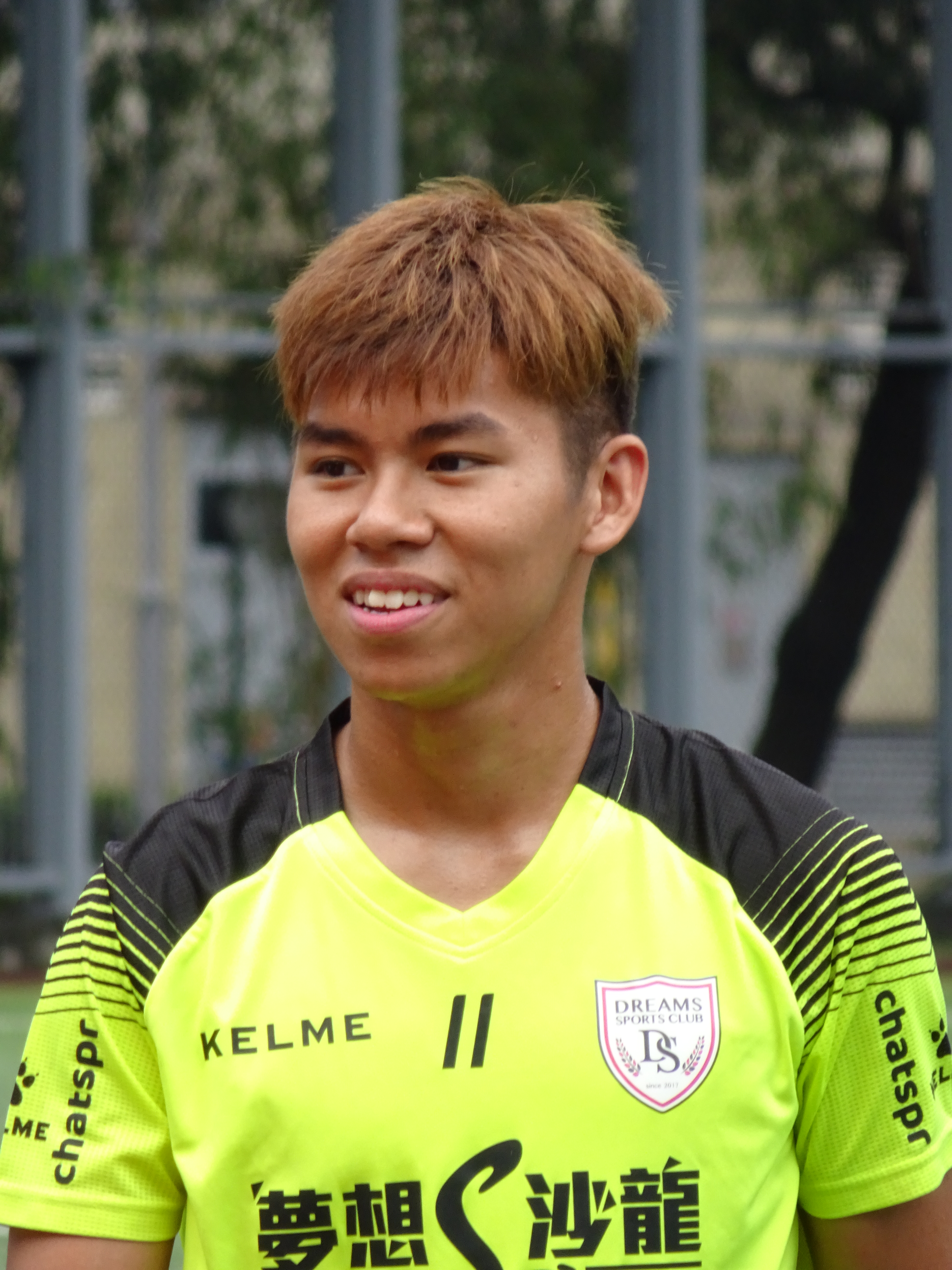

Personal information
- Full name: Hirokane Harima
- Date of birth: 31 January 1998 (age 28)
- Place of birth: Hong Kong
- Height: 1.78 m (5 ft 10 in)
- Position: Forward

Youth career
- 2010–2012: Eastern
- 2012–2013: Rangers (HKG)
- 2013–2016: Kitchee

Senior career*
Years	Team	Apps	(Gls)
2016–2019	Kitchee	1	(0)
2017–2018	→ Dreams (loan)	12	(0)
2018–2019	→ Hoi King (loan)	9	(0)
2019–2020	Eastern	0	(0)
2020–2021	Rangers (HKG)	13	(1)
2021–2023	Resources Capital	13	(0)
2023	HKFC	3	(0)
2024–2025	Ravia		
2025	Tsun Tat		

International career
2013–2014	Hong Kong U16		
2016	Hong Kong U19	1	(0)
2017	Hong Kong U22	1	(0)
- * Club domestic league appearances and goals as of 22 October 2023

Hirokane Harima (播磨 浩謙, Harima Hirokane; Chinese: 播磨浩謙; Cantonese Yale: Bo-moh Houh-hīm; born 31 January 1998) is a former Hong Kong former professional footballer who played as a forward.

== Club career ==
=== Kitchee ===
Born in Hong Kong to a Japanese father and Hong Kong mother, Harima spent time with Eastern and Rangers before joining Kitchee in 2013. He signed his first professional contract in July 2015, and was named among the substitutes the next month in a 2015 AFC Cup game against Kuwait SC, but did not appear in his side's 6–0 defeat.

He would have to wait until March 2016 to make his senior debut, which came in a group stage 2016 AFC Cup game against Balestier Khalsa. He came on as a 64th-minute substitute for Sham Kwok Keung in the 0–1 defeat.

Harima scored his first professional goal in April 2016, the only goal in a 1–0 win over Filipino side Kaya, having replaced Lo Kwan Yee only 3 minutes earlier.

On 7 May 2016, Harima made his league debut for Kitchee in a 2–0 win over Eastern, again replacing Sham Kwok Keung, in the 62nd minute.

=== Dreams ===
On 8 July 2017, Harima was loaned to Dreams for the 2017–18 season along with Cheng Chin Lung and Law Tsz Chun.

=== Hoi King ===
On 24 July 2018, following a preseason friendly, Hoi King confirmed that they had acquired Harima on loan. On 16 January 2019, Harima's loan was terminated and the player returned to Kitchee.

=== Eastern ===
On 30 June 2019, it was reported that Harima would return to Eastern.

=== Rangers ===
On 31 October 2020, it was reported that Harima would join Rangers.

Harima departed the club on 10 July 2021.

=== Resources Capital ===
On 30 August 2021, Harima joined Resources Capital.

=== HKFC ===
On 29 July 2023, Harima joined HKFC.

== Career statistics ==
=== Club ===
As of 29 March 2019.

Club	Season	League			National Cup		League Cup		Continental		Other		Total	
Club	Season	Division	Apps	Goals	Apps	Goals	Apps	Goals	Apps	Goals	Apps	Goals	Apps	Goals
Kitchee	2015–16	Hong Kong Premier League	1	0	0	0	1 (Note: Appearances in the Hong Kong Sapling Cup)	0	4 (Note: Appearances in the AFC Cup)	1	0	0	5	1
Kitchee	2016–17	Hong Kong Premier League	0	0	0	0	1	0	1 (Note: Appearances in the AFC Champions League)	0	1 (Note: Appearances in the Hong Kong Community Cup)	0	3	0
Kitchee	2017–18	Hong Kong Premier League	0	0	0	0	0	0	0	0	0	0	0	0
Kitchee	2018–19	Hong Kong Premier League	0	0	0	0	2	0	0	0	0	0	0	0
Kitchee	Total		1	0	0	0	4	0	5	1	1	0	11	1
Dreams (loan)	2017–18	Hong Kong Premier League	12	0	0	0	3	1	–		1 (Note: Appearances in the Hong Kong Senior Shield)	0	16	1
Hoi King (loan)	2018–19	Hong Kong Premier League	9	0	0	0	0	0	–		0	0	9	0
Career total			22	0	0	0	7	1	5	1	2	0	36	2

== Honours ==
=== Club ===
Eastern

- Hong Kong Senior Shield: 2019–20
- Hong Kong FA Cup: 2019–20

Kitchee

- Hong Kong Senior Shield: 2018–19
- Hong Kong FA Cup: 2018–19
