= 2005 Hong Kong–Shanghai Cup =

2005 Hong Kong–Shanghai Cup was the last set of Hong Kong-Shanghai Cup.

Shanghai Shenhua won Kitchee 1–0.

== Result ==
2005-02-16
15:00 GMT+8

Kitchee	0 – 1	Shanghai Shenhua
	(Report)	Sun Ji 66'

Mong Kok Stadium, Hong Kong
Attendance: 1,549
