= Juanjo García =

Spanish football manager (1945–1987)

Personal information
- Full name: Juan José García Santos
- Date of birth: 11 September 1945
- Place of birth: Spain
- Date of death: 23 May 1987 (aged 41)
- Place of death: Spain

Managerial career
- Years: Team
- 1979–1981: Real Madrid Castilla
- 1982–1983: Rayo Vallecano
- 1984: Tenerife
- 1984–1985: Real Jaén
- Cultural Leonesa

Juan José García Santos (11 September 1945 – 23 May 1987) was a Spanish football manager and former footballer who last managed Cultural Leonesa.

== Playing career ==
García retired from professional football at the age of twenty-six after suffering a knee injury.

== Managerial career ==
García started his managerial career with Spanish side Real Madrid Castilla, helping the club reach the 1980 Copa del Rey final. After that, he was appointed manager of Spanish fourth tier side Cultural Leonesa, helping them earn promotion to the Spanish third tier.

== Personal life ==
He is the father of Spanish football manager Abraham García.
