= Abraham García =

Spanish football manager

Personal information
- Full name: Abraham García Aliaga
- Date of birth: 11 January 1974 (age 52)
- Place of birth: Madrid, Spain

Youth career
- Years: Team
- Escolapios

Managerial career
- 1990–1991: Escolapios (youth)
- 1991–1998: Rayo Majadahonda (youth)
- 1998–2003: Atlético Madrid (youth)
- 2003–2004: Atlético Madrid C
- 2004–2007: Real Madrid C
- 2007–2009: Atlético Madrid B
- 2010–2011: Montañeros
- 2012: Estepona
- 2012–2013: Toledo
- 2014: Yinchuan Helanshan
- 2015–2016: Kitchee
- 2016–2018: Segoviana

Abraham García Aliaga (born 11 January 1974) is a Spanish football manager.

== Coaching career ==
Madrid-born García began his managerial career at lowly locals CD Escolapios Alcalá at the age of just 16, while also playing in the club's youth setup. He then joined CF Rayo Majadahonda, working in various youth categories before joining Atlético Madrid in 1998 and being appointed manager of the Cadete A squad.

García was appointed manager of Atleti's Juvenil A squad in 2000, being the last coach of Fernando Torres before his senior career kickstarter; he was credited by Torres as one of the most important managers of his career. In 2003, he was named manager of the C-team in Tercera División.

In 2004, García moved to city rivals Real Madrid, being appointed in charge of the C-team also in the fourth division. He left the club in July 2007, immediately returning to Atlético to take over the reserves in Segunda División B.

García left Atlético in 2009, remaining nearly one year without a club before being appointed manager of Montañeros CF on 19 June 2010. He was sacked the following 13 January, and was named in charge of Unión Estepona CF in April 2012; after missing out promotion in the play-offs two months later, he left the club.

On 21 June 2012, García was appointed manager of CD Toledo, freshly relegated to the fourth tier. After achieving promotion to division three, he moved to China to manage newly-formed side Yinchuan Helanshan FC; he left the club at the end of the 2014 China League Two.

On 29 July 2015, García switched teams and countries again after being named in charge of Hong Kong Premier League side Kitchee SC. He resigned on 5 March of the following year, and returned to his home country, being appointed manager of Gimnástica Segoviana CF on 22 June 2016.

García led the Castilian-Leonese side back to the third division after a five-year absence, but could not avoid the club's subsequent relegation, and left on 21 May 2018. He subsequently started to work for the Madrid Football Federation as an under-18 coach.

== Personal life ==
García's father Juanjo was also a manager, notably coaching Real Madrid Castilla, CD Tenerife and Rayo Vallecano in Segunda División. He died on 23 May 1987 after having a heart attack.
