= Edgar Cardoso (football manager) =

Portuguese football manager (born 1983)

Personal information
- Full name: Edgar Filipe Martins Cardoso
- Date of birth: 16 March 1983 (age 43)
- Place of birth: Portugal

Managerial career
- Years: Team
- 2002–2014: Benfica (youth)
- 2016–2019: Qatar U23 (assistant)
- 2020–2023: Shakhtar (youth)
- 2023–2024: Kitchee (assistant)
- 2024–2025: Kitchee
- 2025–: Estoril (assistant)

Edgar Filipe Martins Cardoso (born 16 March 1983) is a Portuguese football

== Life and career ==
Cardoso never played professional football. In 2002, he was appointed as a youth manager of Portuguese side Benfica. After that, he worked as a youth manager for the Aspire Academy in Qatar. In 2016, Cardoso was appointed assistant manager of the Qatar national under-23 football team. He worked as assistant manager to Spanish manager Félix Sánchez. In 2020, he was appointed youth manager of Ukrainian side Shakhtar. In 2021, he renewed his contract with the club until 2023. He worked for the club during the Russian invasion of Ukraine.

After that, he worked as a consultant for Belgian football consultant group Double Pass. In 2024, he was appointed manager of Hong Kong side Kitchee. He previously worked as assistant manager of the club. He worked as assistant manager to South Korean manager Kim Dong-jin. He was described as "unable to arrest Kitchee’s slide at the back end of [the 2023/24 season]". He remained as their manager for the 2024/25 season.

Cardoso was born on 16 March 1983 in Portugal. He obtained the UEFA Pro License.
