= Law Tsz Chun =

Hong Kong footballer (born 1997)

Law Tsz Chun 羅梓駿
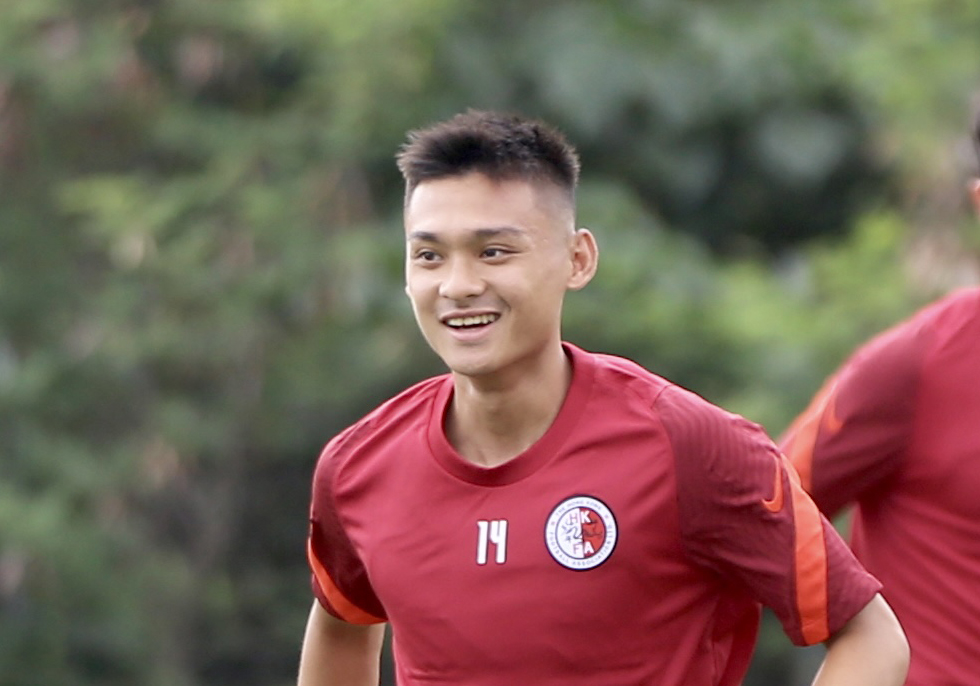
- Law in Hong Kong training in 2021

Personal information
- Full name: Law Tsz Chun
- Date of birth: 2 March 1997 (age 29)
- Place of birth: Hong Kong
- Height: 1.71 m (5 ft 7 1/2 in)
- Positions: Right back; right wing; left-back

Team information
- Current team: Sha Tin
- Number: 31

Youth career
- 2008–2015: Kitchee

Senior career*
Years	Team	Apps	(Gls)
2015–2026	Kitchee	85	(3)
2017–2018	→ Dreams FC (loan)	15	(0)
2026–	Sha Tin	6	(0)

International career^{‡}
2014	Hong Kong U18	1	(0)
2017–2019	Hong Kong U22	4	(0)
2019–2024	Hong Kong	25	(1)
- * Club domestic league appearances and goals as of 22 November 2026 ‡ National team caps and goals as of 1 January 2024

Law Tsz Chun (Chinese: 羅梓駿; born 2 March 1997) is a Hong Kong professional footballer who currently plays as a full-back for Hong Kong Premier League club Sha Tin.

== Club career ==
Law joined the Kitchee academy in May 2008 and trained there until July 2015 when he signed a professional contract. On 28 October 2015, he made his debut in a Sapling Cup match against Yuen Long.

In July 2017, Law joined Dreams FC on loan in search of more first team football. In December, he was named on the 40 man preliminary squad for the 2018 Guangdong–Hong Kong Cup but did not make the final squad.

On 30 June 2026, Law left Kitchee after 18 years at the club.

On 8 August 2026, Law joined newly promoted Sha Tin.

== International career ==
On 10 September 2019, Law made his senior international debut for Hong Kong in the World Cup qualifiers against Iran.

On 26 December 2023, Law was named in Hong Kong's squad for the 2023 AFC Asian Cup.

== Career statistics ==
=== Club ===
As of 13 May 2023

Club	Season	League			National Cup		Other Cups		Continental		Other		Total	
Club	Season	Division	Apps	Goals	Apps	Goals	Apps	Goals	Apps	Goals	Apps	Goals	Apps	Goals
Kitchee	2014–15	Hong Kong Premier League	0	0	0	0	0	0	0	0	0	0	0	0
Kitchee	2015–16	Hong Kong Premier League	2	0	0 (Note: Appearances in the FA Cup)	0	1 (Note: Appearances in the Sapling Cup)	0	5 (Note: Appearances in the AFC Cup)	0	1 (Note: Appearances in the League Cup)	0	9	0
Kitchee	2016–17	Hong Kong Premier League	0	0	2	0	1	0	1 (Note: Appearances in the AFC Champions League qualification)	0	0	0	4	0
Kitchee	2017–18	Hong Kong Premier League	0	0	0	0	0	0	0	0	0	0	0	0
Kitchee	2018–19	Hong Kong Premier League	8	0	0	0	2	0	6 (Note: Appearances in the AFC Champions League qualification and AFC Cup)	0	2 (Note: Appearances in the Senior Shield)	0	18	0
Kitchee	2019–20	Hong Kong Premier League	11	1	0	0	5	0	0	0	1	0	17	1
Kitchee	2020–21	Hong Kong Premier League	10	0	0	0	4	0	6 (Note: Appearances in the AFC Champions League)	0	0	0	20	0
Kitchee	2021–22	Hong Kong Premier League	0	0	2	0	6	0	5	1	0	0	13	1
Kitchee	2022–23	Hong Kong Premier League	13	1	3	0	7	0	0	0	2	0	25	1
Total			44	2	7	0	26	0	23	1	6	0	106	3
Dreams FC (Loan)	2017–18	Hong Kong Premier League	15	0	0	0	5	0	0	0	1	0	21	0
Career total			69	2	7	0	31	0	23	1	7	0	127	3

=== International ===
As of 1 January 2024

National team	Year	Apps	Goals
Hong Kong	2019	7	0
Hong Kong	2020	0	0
Hong Kong	2021	1	0
Hong Kong	2022	9	1
Hong Kong	2023	7	0
Hong Kong	2024	1	0
Total		25	1

#	Date	Venue	Opponent	Result	Competition
2019
1	10 September 2019	Hong Kong Stadium, Hong Kong	Iran	0–2	2022 FIFA World Cup qualification – AFC second round
2	10 October 2019	Basra International Stadium, Basra, Iraq	Iraq	0–2	2022 FIFA World Cup qualification – AFC second round
3	14 November 2019	Hong Kong Stadium, Hong Kong	Bahrain	0–0	2022 FIFA World Cup qualification – AFC second round
4	19 November 2019	Hong Kong Stadium, Hong Kong	Cambodia	2–0	2022 FIFA World Cup qualification – AFC second round
5	11 December 2019	Busan Asiad Main Stadium, Busan, South Korea	South Korea	0–2	2019 EAFF E-1 Football Championship
6	14 December 2019	Busan Gudeok Stadium, Busan, South Korea	Japan	0–5	2019 EAFF E-1 Football Championship
7	18 December 2019	Busan Asiad Main Stadium, Busan, South Korea	China	0–2	2019 EAFF E-1 Football Championship
2021
8	15 June 2021	Bahrain National Stadium, Riffa, Bahrain	Bahrain	0–4	2022 FIFA World Cup qualification – AFC second round
2022
9	1 June 2022	National Stadium Bukit Jalil, Kuala Lumpur, Malaysia	Malaysia	0–2	Friendly
10	8 June 2022	Salt Lake Stadium, Kolkata, India	Afghanistan	2–1	2023 AFC Asian Cup qualification – third round
11	11 June 2022	Salt Lake Stadium, Kolkata, India	Cambodia	3–0	2023 AFC Asian Cup qualification – third round
12	14 June 2022	Salt Lake Stadium, Kolkata, India	India	0–4	2023 AFC Asian Cup qualification – third round
13	19 July 2022	Kashima Stadium, Kashima, Japan	Japan	0–6	2022 EAFF E-1 Football Championship
14	24 July 2022	Toyota Stadium, Toyota, Japan	South Korea	0–3	2022 EAFF E-1 Football Championship
15	27 July 2022	Toyota Stadium, Toyota, Japan	China	0–1	2022 EAFF E-1 Football Championship
16	21 September 2022	Mong Kok Stadium, Mong Kok, Hong Kong	Myanmar	2–0	Friendly
17	24 September 2022	Hong Kong Stadium, Hong Kong	Myanmar	0–0	Friendly
2023
18	23 March 2023	Mong Kok Stadium, Mong Kok, Hong Kong	Singapore	1–1	Friendly
19	28 March 2023	Sultan Ibrahim Stadium, Johor, Malaysia	Malaysia	0–2	Friendly
20	15 June 2023	Lạch Tray Stadium, Hai Phong, Hong Kong	Vietnam	0–1	Friendly
21	19 June 2023	Hong Kong Stadium, So Kon Po, Hong Kong	Thailand	0–1	Friendly
22	11 September 2023	Hong Kong Stadium, So Kon Po, Hong Kong	Brunei	10–0	Friendly
23	12 October 2023	Hong Kong Stadium, So Kon Po, Hong Kong	Bhutan	4–0	2026 FIFA World Cup qualification – AFC first round
24	16 November 2023	Azadi Stadium, Tehran, Iran	Iran	0–4	2026 FIFA World Cup qualification – AFC second round
2024
25	1 January 2024	Baniyas Stadium, Abu Dhabi, United Arab Emirates	China	2–1	Friendly

=== International goals ===
No	Date	Cap	Venue	Opponent	Score	Result	Competition
1.	21 September 2022	16	Mong Kok Stadium, Mong Kok, Hong Kong	Myanmar	2–0	2–0	Friendly

== Honours ==
=== Club ===
Kitchee

- Hong Kong Premier League: 2016–17, 2019–20, 2020–21, 2022–23, 2025–26
- Hong Kong Senior Shield: 2016-17, 2018–19, 2022–23, 2023–24
- Hong Kong FA Cup: 2016–17, 2018–19, 2022–23
- Hong Kong League Cup: 2015–16
- Hong Kong Sapling Cup: 2019–20
