= Dani Cancela =

Spanish-born Hong Kong footballer (born 1981)

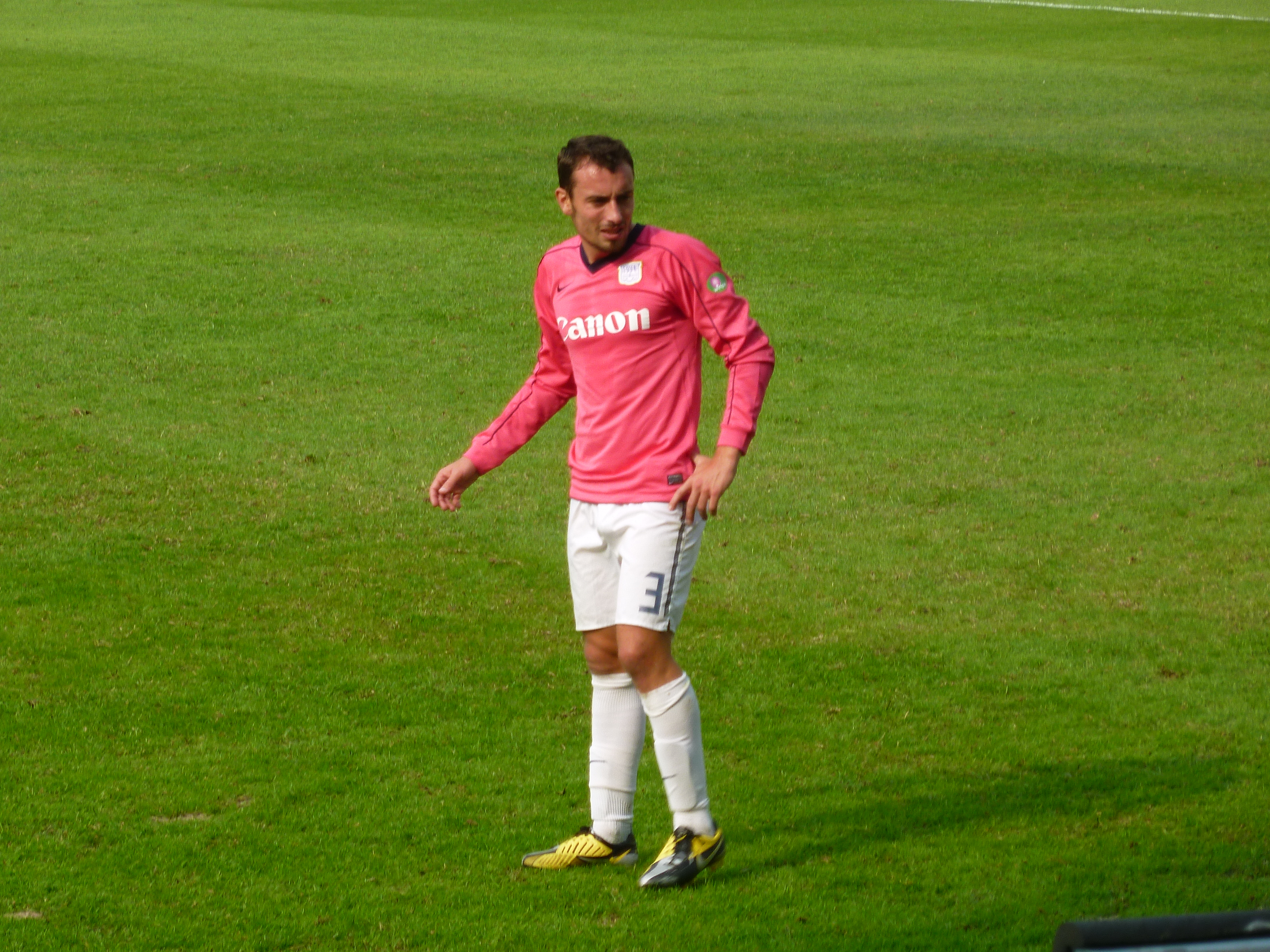
- Cancela with Kitchee in 2012

Personal information
- Full name: Daniel Cancela Rodríguez
- Date of birth: 23 September 1981 (age 45)
- Place of birth: A Coruña, Spain
- Height: 1.76 m (5 ft 9 in)
- Position: Left-back

Youth career
- Deportivo La Coruña

Senior career*
Years	Team	Apps	(Gls)
2000–2006	Deportivo B	158	(12)
2000–2001	→ Malpica (loan)	37	(6)
2006–2008	Fuenlabrada	60	(0)
2008–2010	Lugo	38	(1)
2010–2022	Kitchee	155	(4)
Total		448	(23)

International career
2017–2019	Hong Kong	15	(0)
- * Club domestic league appearances and goals

Daniel "Dani" Cancela Rodríguez (Chinese: 丹尼; born 23 September 1981) is a former professional footballer who played as a left-back.

Born in Spain, he spent most of his career with Kitchee in Hong Kong after signing in 2010, eventually going on to represent the Hong Kong national team.

== Club career ==
=== Spain ===
Born in A Coruña, Galicia, Cancela played several years for Deportivo de La Coruña, but only appeared officially for the reserves where he spent five seasons, four in the Tercera División. He was also loaned to amateurs Malpica SDC during his contract.

After leaving the Estadio Riazor in 2006, Cancela moved to the Segunda División B, competing two seasons apiece with CF Fuenlabrada and CD Lugo.

=== Hong Kong ===
Cancela signed for Kitchee SC in Hong Kong on 26 July 2010, alongside compatriots Fernando Recio and Jordi Tarrés. On 28 January of the following year, he renewed his contract for another two years.

On 19 August 2022, after a match against BG Pathum United F.C. in the round of 16 of the AFC Champions League, Cancela announced his retirement at the age of 40. He made 250 competitive appearances during his spell at the Mong Kok Stadium, winning several honours including eight Premier Leagues.

== International career ==
Cancela received his Hong Kong passport in October 2017, at the age of 36. He made his debut for the national team on 5 October, in a 4–0 friendly win over Laos.

== Career statistics ==
=== Club ===
Appearances and goals by club, season and competition
Club	Season	League			Cup		Other		Total	
Club	Season	Division	Apps	Goals	Apps	Goals	Apps	Goals	Apps	Goals
Fuenlabrada	2006–07	Segunda División B	29	0	1	0	0	0	30	0
Fuenlabrada	2007–08	Segunda División B	31	0	0	0	0	0	31	0
Fuenlabrada	Total		60	0	1	0	0	0	61	0
Lugo	2008–09	Segunda División B	16	0	1	0	0	0	17	0
Lugo	2009–10	Segunda División B	22	1	0	0	0	0	22	1
Lugo	Total		38	1	1	0	0	0	39	1
Kitchee	2010–11	Hong Kong First Division League	15	0	3	0	0	0	18	0
Kitchee	2011–12	Hong Kong First Division League	15	0	5	0	7	0	27	0
Kitchee	2012–13	Hong Kong First Division League	10	0	5	0	0	0	15	0
Kitchee	2013–14	Hong Kong First Division League	19	3	4	0	0	0	23	3
Kitchee	2014–15	Hong Kong Premier League	11	0	8	0	0	0	19	0
Kitchee	2015–16	Hong Kong Premier League	12	0	7	1	0	0	19	1
Kitchee	2016–17	Hong Kong Premier League	19	1	7	0	0	0	26	1
Kitchee	2017–18	Hong Kong Premier League	8	0	10	0	4	0	22	0
Kitchee	2018–19	Hong Kong Premier League	17	0	8	0	7	1	32	1
Kitchee	2019–20	Hong Kong Premier League	10	0	3	0	0	0	13	0
Kitchee	2020–21	Hong Kong Premier League	16	0	6	0	5	0	27	0
Kitchee	2021–22	Hong Kong Premier League	3	0	5	0	1	0	9	0
Kitchee	Total		155	4	71	1	24	1	250	6
Career total			253	5	73	1	24	1	350	7

=== International ===
Appearances and goals by national team and year
National team	Year	Apps	Goals
Hong Kong	2017	4	0
Hong Kong	2018	6	0
Hong Kong	2019	5	0
Total		15	0

== Honours ==
Kitchee

- Hong Kong Premier League: 2014–15, 2016–17, 2017–18, 2019–20, 2020–21
- Hong Kong First Division: 2010–11, 2011–12, 2013–14
- Hong Kong Senior Shield: 2016–17, 2018–19
- Hong Kong FA Cup: 2011–12, 2012–13, 2014–15, 2016–17, 2017–18, 2018–19
- Hong Kong Sapling Cup: 2017–18, 2019–20
- Hong Kong League Cup: 2011–12, 2014–15, 2015–16
