= Kitchee SC =

Association football club in Hong Kong

Kitchee
- Full name: Kitchee Sports Club
- Nicknames: The Bluewaves (香港巴塞); The Bluebirds (藍鳥)
- Founded: 1931; 95 years ago
- Ground: Tseung Kwan O Sports Ground
- Capacity: 3,500
- President: Ken Ng
- Head coach: Iñigo Calderón
- League: Hong Kong Premier League
- 2025–26: Hong Kong Premier League, 1st of 10
- Website: www.kitchee.com
Home colours	Away colours

Kitchee Sports Club (Chinese: 傑志體育會; Jyutping: Git6zi3 Tai2juk6wui2; [kit̚˨ tsi˧ tʰɐj˧˥ jʊk̚˨ wuj˧˥]; pinyin: Jiézhì tǐyù huì) is a Hong Kong professional football club based in Kowloon. It was founded in 1931 and currently competes in the Hong Kong Premier League.

Throughout the club history, Kitchee is one of the most successful club in Hong Kong where they won 13 league titles, including 7 Hong Kong First Division titles and 7 Hong Kong Premier League titles. They also won 7 FA Cups, 5 League Cup and 9 Senior Shield. The club is also the first Hong Kong club to win a game in the AFC Champions League group stage and to advance to the round of 16 of the competition.

== History ==
=== Formation of the club (1931–1938) ===
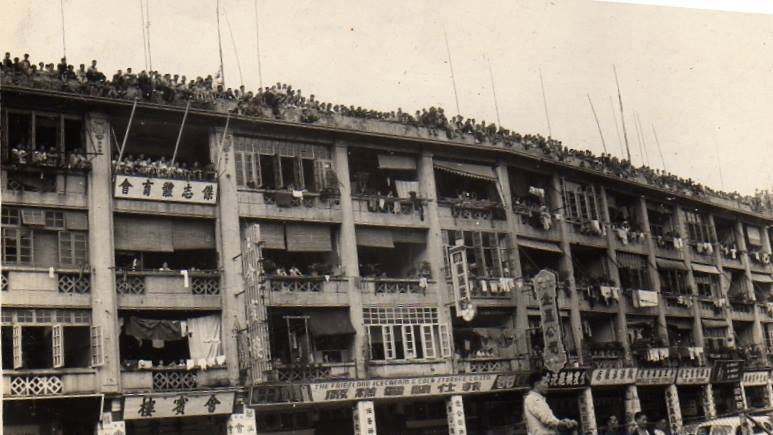
Kitchee's first headquarters at 130 Johnston Road, Wan Chai.

In the late 1920s, a group of Hong Kongers formed a football team in order to compete in the Hong Kong Third Division. It was not until 1931, however, that the team was established as Kitchee Sports Club.

Kitchee was founded as a grassroots organization, as such, they lacked the funding to pay the administrative and facilities costs necessary to become a multi sports club.

It was not until 1934 when the club were able to raise the money to rent an office at 130 Johnston Road in Wan Chai, that they were admitted as members of the Hong Kong Football Association.

=== World War II era (1939–1946) ===
In 1939, Japanese bombs hit Hong Kong during the Second Sino-Japanese War. The club's records during this time were destroyed during the bombing.

As the Pacific War began, Hong Kong fell to the Japanese on 25 December 1941, therefore the club's operations were suspended during the three-year, eight-month Japanese occupation of Hong Kong.

After the Japanese surrender of Hong Kong in August 1945, former members of Kitchee returned to the club. They resolved to help revitalize the Chinese Amateur Athletic Federation of Hong Kong and establish the Chinese Football Association of Hong Kong, the Hong Kong Chinese Football Referees’ Association and the Hong Kong Chinese Footballer's Fraternity.

=== Rise to prominence and first dynasty (1947–1964) ===
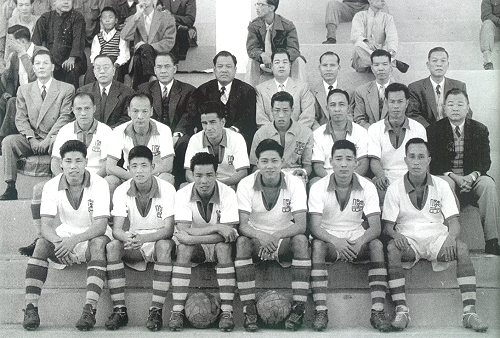
Kitchee squad in Macau ahead of a charity exhibition match in 1959.

Following the war, Kitchee were admitted into the 1947–48 Hong Kong First Division League where they won the league title, the club's first major trophy. Between 1947 and 1964, the club won three Hong Kong First Division titles, one Second Division title, four Hong Kong Senior Shield's and one Hong Kong Junior Shield.

During this period, Kitchee discovered Hong Kong football legends Yiu Cheuk Yin and Lam Sheung Yee. Yiu led the club to its first two First Division titles and later became known as the "Treasure of Hong Kong Football." Lam spent a total 14 years at Kitchee, split between two spells, and was a part of every Kitchee squad which won a trophy between 1948 and 1964.

=== Yo-yo years (1965–2000) ===
In 1965–66, Kitchee won only one game while drawing four others in the season, finishing second bottom of the table. The club were relegated after a 17-year spell in the top flight. In the subsequent season, Kitchee slid into the Third Division for the first time in three decades.

In the late 1980s, Law Ding Chun was hired as the new chairman of Kitchee. Law moved quickly to modernize the operations of Kitchee, buying insurance for all of his players in order to provide them with peace of mind in the event of an injury. His changes worked as Kitchee were soon promoted back to the Second Division.

In 1991–92, Kitchee won the Second Division title, returning to the top flight for the first time in 26 years. The squad during this period featured many future Hong Kong internationals including Yau Kin Wai, Chung Ho Yin, Yeung Hei Chi, Yeung Ching Kwong, Dale Tempest, as well as former England international Mark Barham. Kitchee spent three seasons in the top flight before they were relegated along with Kui Tan at the end of the 1994–95 season.

During the 1998–99 season, Kitchee won promotion back to the First Division as well as the Hong Kong Junior Shield. The following year, the squad were led by a backbone of young local players such as Lee Wai Lun, Man Pei Tak and Ng Wai Chiu.

However, these were soon poached by bigger clubs and due to inadequate replacements, the performance of the team suffered and Kitchee were once again relegated at the conclusion of the 2000–01 season.

Ahead of the 2002–03 season, former Hong Kong national team manager Chan Hung Ping was hired as Kitchee's manager. He led the team to the Second Division title in his one and only season as manager.

=== Back to the top flight (2003–2009) ===
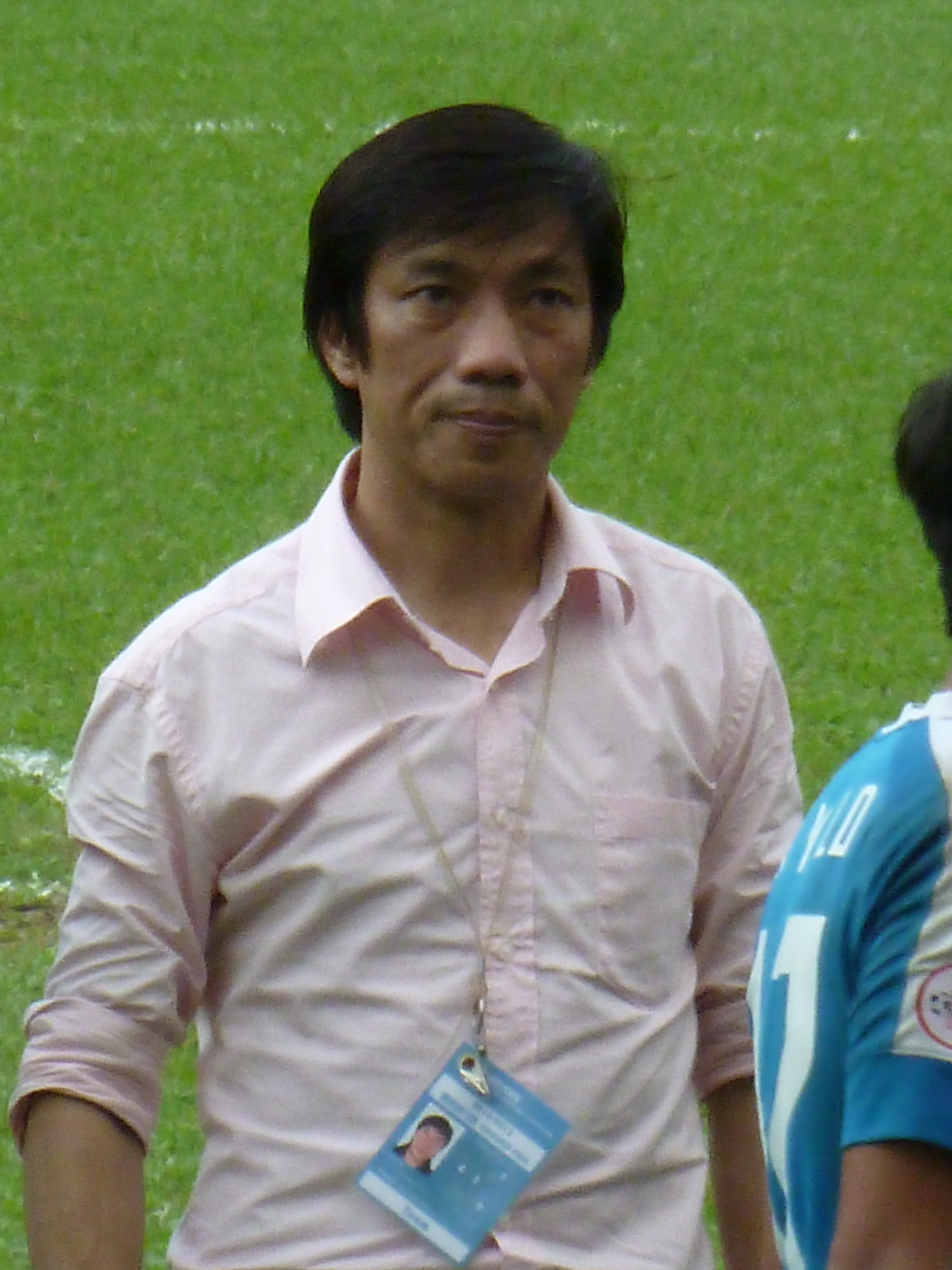
Chu Chi Kwong is the most decorated manager in the club history helping Kitchee to win 16 titles and also won the Hong Kong Coach of the Year award on three occasions.

Following their return to the First Division in 2003, Kitchee became one of the most prominent teams in Hong Kong, winning three trophies in two seasons under coach Dejan Antonic: two in 2005–06 and one in 2006–07 season.

The club secured 2nd place in the league, along with league champions South China who had already qualified for the AFC Cup as the Hong Kong Senior Shield winners. As a result, Kitchee became one of two Hong Kong representatives in the 2008 AFC Cup. In the 2008 AFC Cup, Kitchee was drawn in Group E where they were drawn alongside Malaysian club Perak, Singaporean club Singapore Armed Forces and Maldivian club New Radiant. Kitchee recorded their win first in a 2–0 win over New Radiant on 18 March 2008 where Wilfred Bamnjo and Goran Stankovski scored the goal. However, Kitchee was bowed out from the tournament after finishing third in the group stage.

=== Rebuilding and decade of dominance (2009–2023) ===
==== Josep Gombau era (2009–2013) ====
In the 2010–11 season, under coach Josep Gombau, Kitchee won its first league title in 47 years by one point over arch rival South China, allowing the club to compete in both the 2011 Premier League Asia Trophy, where they lost 0–4 to Chelsea and 0–3 to Blackburn Rovers, and in the 2012 AFC Cup.

Kitchee were invited to take part in the 2010 Singapore Cup, becoming the first Hong Kong team to take part in the tournament. The club lost to Étoile 4–6 over two legs in the quarter-final.

==== Domestic treble ====

Kitchee 2011–12 season domestic treble winning squad

In the 2011–12 season, Kitchee won the domestic treble after successfully defending their league title and also winning both the 2011–12 Hong Kong FA Cup after defeating TSW Pegasus 5–3 on penalties and the 2011–12 Hong Kong League Cup defeating the same opponent 2–1 in the league cup final. In the 2012 AFC Cup, Kitchee was drawn in Group F alongside Malaysian club Terengganu, Singaporean club Tampines Rovers and Vietnamese club Sông Lam Nghệ An. Kitchee manage to topped the group and advance to the round of 16 where the club faced off against Indonesian club Arema, however, Kitchee lost 2–0 thus crashing out from the tournament.

Kitchee won the 2013–14 First Division league title after both co-caretakers, Chu Chi Kwong and Cheng Siu Chung guided the team to their first top flight title after 3 years.

==== José Francisco Molina era (2014–2015) ====
On 23 May 2014, Kitchee appointed former Atlético Madrid goalkeeper José Francisco Molina as the club manager ahead of the inaugural revamp Hong Kong Premier League season. Molina helms the club to win the 2014–15 league title, the 2014–15 HKFA Cup and the 2014–15 League Cup, completing the domestic treble for the second time in the club history.

Between 2011 and 2014, Kitchee players combined to win the Footballer of the Year award for four straight years. The recipients of this award were Roberto Losada in 2011, Lo Kwan Yee in 2012, Huang Yang in 2013 and Fernando Recio in 2014.

In 2016–17, Kitchee completed a treble for the third time, capturing the Senior Shield, the Hong Kong FA Cup and the Hong Kong Premier League title. The club promoted long time assistant coach Chu Chi Kwong to head coach role and Director of Football. Brazilian attacking midfielder Fernando won the 2017 Footballer of the Year award while striker Sandro won the Golden Boot.

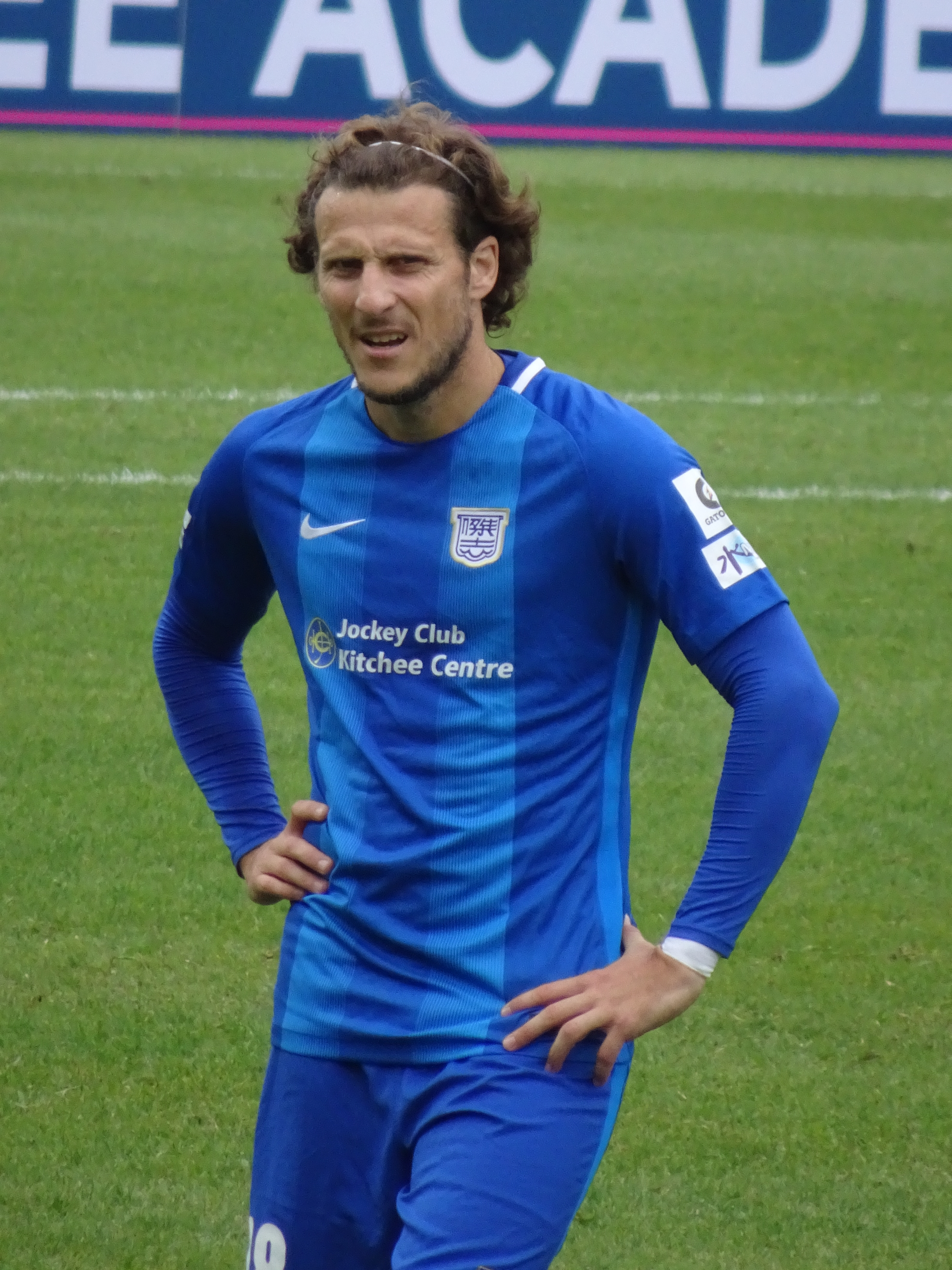
Diego Forlán from Uruguay ended his professional football career with Kitchee

During the 2017 AFC Champions League qualifiers, Kitchee won against Vietnam's Hanoi 3–2 but lost in the playoff rounds to Ulsan Hyundai in penalties.

==== AFC Champions League debut ====
The following season, Kitchee directly qualified 2018 AFC Champions League group stage after winning the 2016–17 season league title. To prepare for the competition, the club signed former FIFA World Cup Golden Ball winner, Uruguayan footballer Diego Forlán. Kitchee was drawn in Group E alongside Japanese club Kashiwa Reysol, Korean club Jeonbuk Hyundai Motors and Chinese club Tianjin Quanjin. On 14 March 2018, Cheng Chin Lung scored in stoppage time to secure Kitchee a 1–0 win over Kashiwa Reysol at home, becoming the first team from Hong Kong to win a game in the history of the AFC Champions League group stage. Domestically, Kitchee won the Premier League, FA Cup and the Sapling Cup, completing a treble for the second consecutive season and the fourth in club history.

In 2021, Kitchee signed former Montenegrin international Dejan Damjanović, who won the Golden Boot with 17 goals. ls in his first season with the club. Kitchee won the 2020–21 Hong Kong Premier League title on the final day of the season, beating rivals Eastern 2–0. Kitchee followed up their domestic success by accumulating 11 points in their 2021 AFC Champions League, a record for a Hong Kong club in the competition.

2022 AFC Champions League Round of 16 match vs BG Pathum United at the Saitama Urawa Komaba Stadium

During the 2022 AFC Champions League, Kitchee made history by becoming the first Hong Kong club to advance to the round of 16. However, the club suffered a 4–0 thrashing defeat to Thai club BG Pathum United.

In 2022–23 season, Kitchee completed a treble again by winning the Senior Shield, the Hong Kong FA Cup and the Hong Kong Premier League title.

=== Club overhaul (2024–present) ===
During the 2023–24 season, Kitchee went through a complete overhaul which saw the likes of Charlie Scott, Mikael, Cleiton depart. However they have internally hired Portuguese Edgar Cardoso as their new head coach along with several new signings which include former Blackburn Rovers youth academy player Jay Haddow as well as English goalkeeper Fynn Talley, Portuguese winger Luis Machado and Brazilian striker Welthon for the 2024–25 season.

However, the club once again failed to acquire any silverware and after Kitchee's humiliating loss to Hong Kong Premier League rivals Lee Man, the club confirmed Edgar Cardoso's departure and will leave once the 2024–25 season ends.

On 4 July 2025, the club unveiled former Brighton & Hove Albion defender Iñigo Calderón as their newest manager to succeed Edgar Cardoso for the 2025–26 season. On 16 September 2025, Kitchee signed former Spanish international and Real Madrid player, Asier Illarramendi on a free transfer.

== Team image ==
=== Supporters ===
Established in 2011, the Blue Wave is the official fans club organised by Kitchee to offer fans with special perks and offers.

Originally a fans-organised cheering group, the Blue Wave became the club's official fans club in 2011, while retaining the name Blue Wave after the reorganisation.

Since its formation, the Blue Wave has become an identity shared by all Kitchee fans as they come to the stadium every match day, cheering and supporting the players on the field.

== Stadium ==
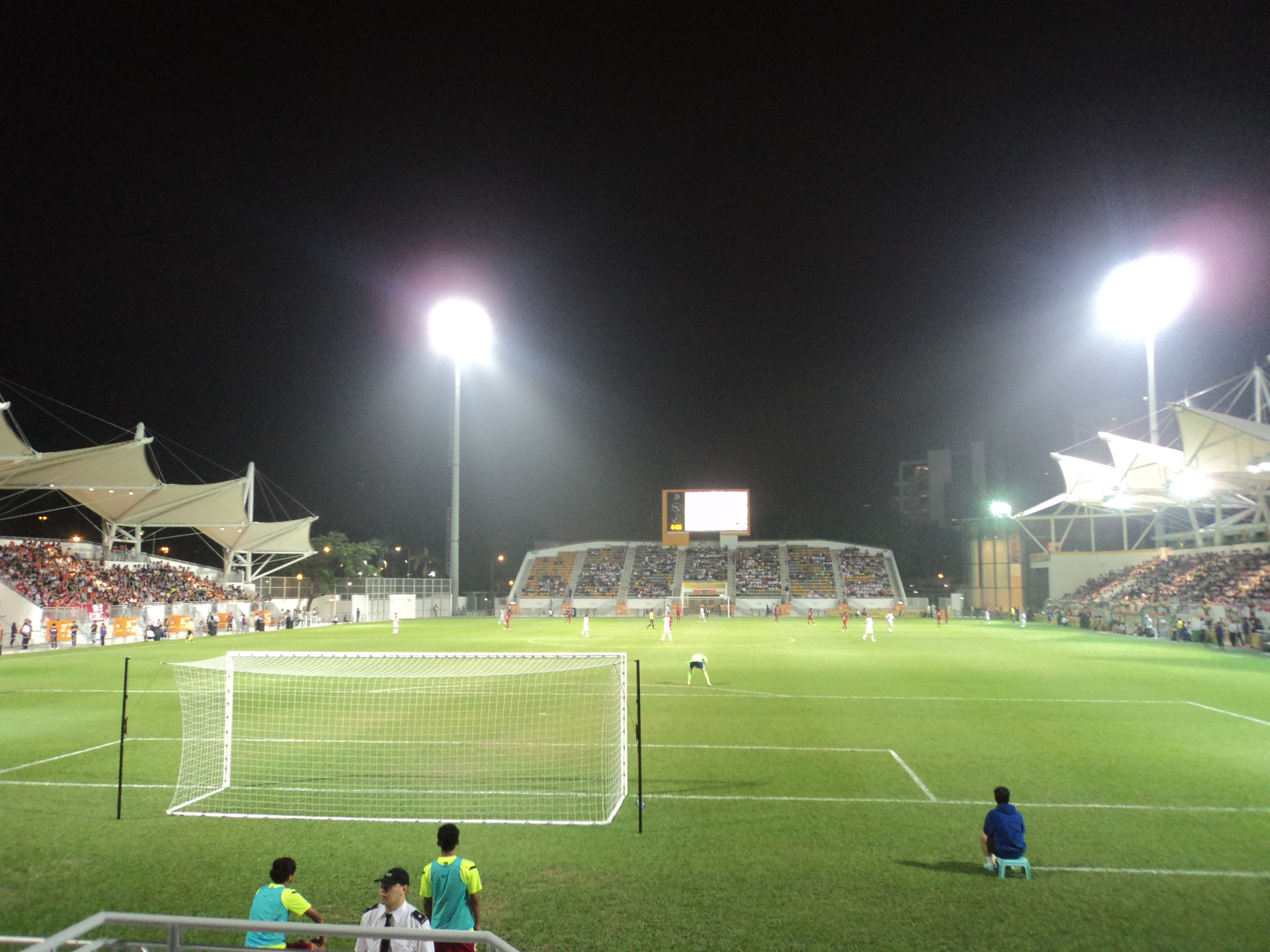
Mong Kok Stadium has been the home ground for the club from 2013 until 2025.

From 2010 to 2012, Kitchee played its home matches at Tseung Kwan O Sports Ground, which served as the club's home venue during this period. In 2013, the club moved to Mong Kok Stadium in Kowloon with a capacity of 6,664, where it established a long-term home ground and played its matches for the following twelve seasons. Mong Kok Stadium remained Kitchee's principal home venue from 2013 through the 2025 season, hosting the club's domestic league and cup fixtures. However, the club host most of their AFC Champions League home matches at the Hong Kong Stadium as it matches the specific requirements set by Asian Football Confederation standard of the tournament.

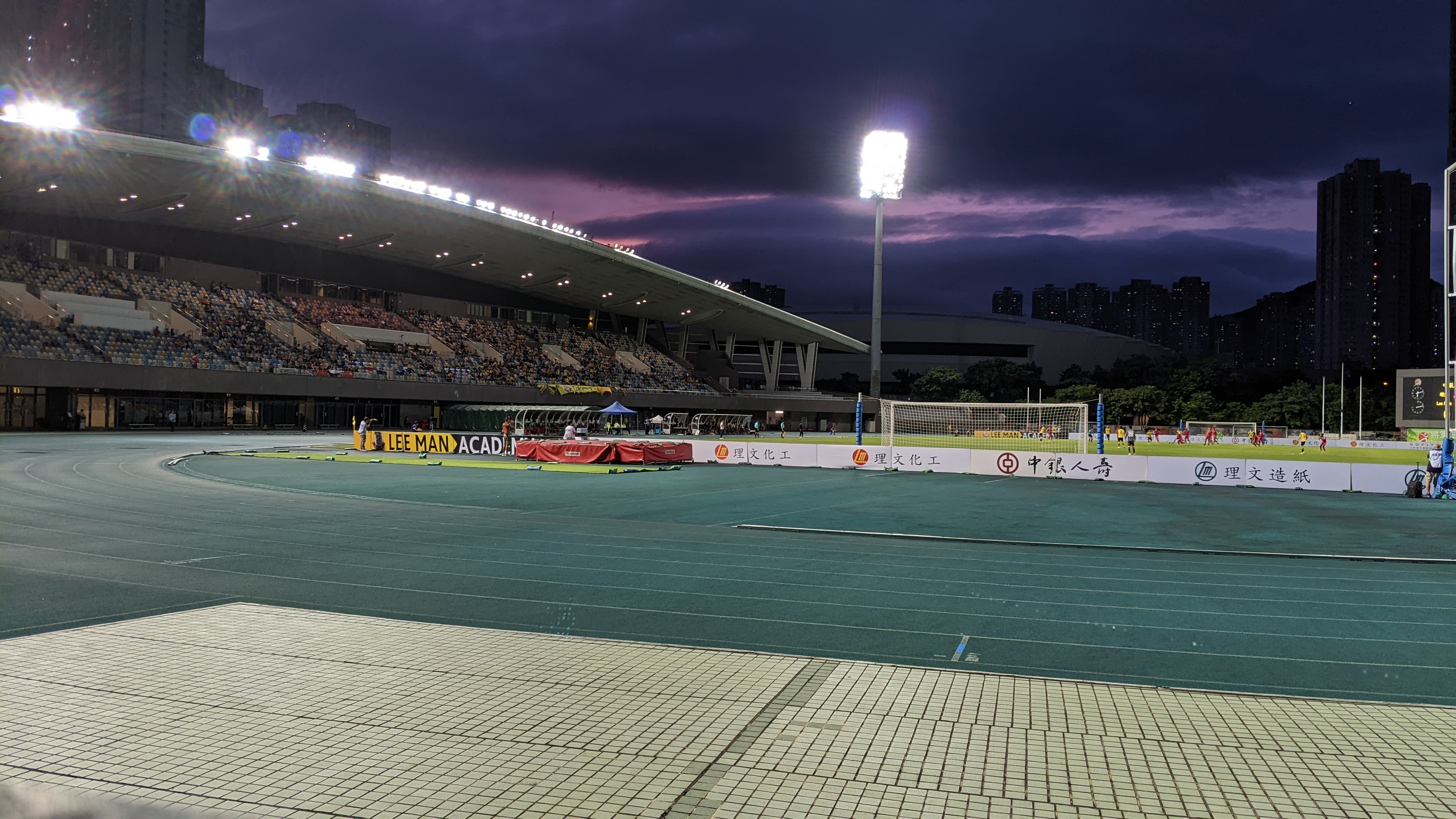
Tseung Kwan O Sports Ground

In 2026, Kitchee returned to Tseung Kwan O Sports Ground, marking the club's return to the venue for the first time since 2012. The move restored the stadium as Kitchee's home ground after thirteen seasons at Mong Kok Stadium. Tseung Kwan O Sports Ground has a seating capacity of approximately 3,500 spectators.

Location	Stadium	Capacity	Year
Tseung Kwan O	Tseung Kwan O Sports Ground	3,500	2010–2012, 2026–present
Mong Kok	Mong Kok Stadium	6,664	2013–2025

== Academy development ==
In 2012, Kitchee Foundation submitted a successful proposal to The Hong Kong Jockey Club Charities Trust for a youth football training centre. The club received over HK$44 million from the trust for the establishment of a training ground at Shek Mun, Shatin, New Territories. The Jockey Club Kitchee Centre, as it was later called, opened in 2014. The trust provided 90% of the funding, with the rest coming in part from the proceeds of a Kitchee vs Arsenal exhibition match where they drew 2–2. Apart from serving as the training ground of Kitchee first team and Kitchee Academy, the centre also provides facilities for the Education Bureau-approved Professional Footballer Preparatory Programme, which Kitchee jointly offers with Yan Chai Hospital Tung Chi Ying Memorial Secondary School, in order to integrate football training into regular school curriculum and schedule. In October 2012, Arsenal donated HK$780,000 to Kitchee Foundation in support of the youth training centre.

Since 2009, Kitchee has been a partner of the Chinese University of Hong Kong in its Injury Prevention and Performance Enhancement (IPPE) program.

== Kit suppliers and shirt sponsors ==
Period	Kit manufacturer	Kit sponsor
2003–2004	(Italy) Diadora	(Hong Kong) Xplore
2004–2008	(Japan) Mizuno	(Japan) Canon
2008–2013	(United States) Nike	(Japan) Canon
2013–2018	(United States) Nike	(Hong Kong) Jockey Club Kitchee Centre
2018–present	(United States) Nike	(Hong Kong) EDPS Systems Ltd.

== Players ==
=== First-team squad ===
As of 2 November 2026

Note: Flags indicate national team as defined under FIFA eligibility rules; some limited exceptions apply. Players may hold more than one non-FIFA nationality.

No.	Pos.	Nation	Player
2	DF	BRA	Marcão
3	DF	ESP	Roger Riera
5	MF	ESP	Asier Illarramendi
6	DF	HKG	Jay Haddow
7	MF	TKM	Ruslan Mingazow (vice-captain)
8	MF	HKG	Cheng Chin Lung
9	FW	ESP	Adrián Revilla
10	MF	BRA	Kendy
11	MF	JPN	Yumemi Kanda
13	GK	CHN	Enikar Mehmud
14	DF	HKG	Kam Chi Kin
15	MF	ESP	Víctor Camarasa
16	MF	HKG	Tan Chun Lok (captain)
17	GK	HKG	Pong Cheuk Hei
18	FW	HKG	Everton Camargo
20	DF	HKG	Dudu

No.	Pos.	Nation	Player
21	FW	ESP	Koldo Obieta
22	DF	HKG	Callum Beattie
23	GK	HKG	Tuscany Shek
24	MF	ESP	Aarón Rey
27	MF	HKG	Jordan Lam
30	FW	HKG	Juninho
37	MF	HKG	Chan Shing Chun
40	MF	HKG	Li Siu Hin
41	DF	HKG	Lam Pak Yin
42	FW	HKG	Cheung Yiu Hin
47	DF	HKG	Yu Ching Wai
50	MF	HKG	Pang Hing Lun
56	FW	HKG	Ma Lok
58	DF	HKG	Lee Sen Hei
61	DF	HKG	Fong Chun Kit

=== Out on loan ===
Note: Flags indicate national team as defined under FIFA eligibility rules; some limited exceptions apply. Players may hold more than one non-FIFA nationality.

No.	Pos.	Nation	Player
—	MF	HKG	Yuen Chun Him (at Eastern District until 31 May 2027)
—	FW	HKG	Chen Ngo Hin (at Kowloon City until 31 May 2027)

=== Retired numbers ===
Note: Flags indicate national team as defined under FIFA eligibility rules; some limited exceptions apply. Players may hold more than one non-FIFA nationality.

No.	Pos.	Nation	Player
19	MF	HKG	Huang Yang

== Management and staff ==
=== Club personnel ===
Position	Name
President	(Hong Kong) Ken Ng
Executive director	(Hong Kong) Ave Ip
Vice president	(Hong Kong) Jessica Ng
Technical director of academy	(Hong Kong) Jordi Tarrés
Customer service manager	(Hong Kong) Cheng Ching Yu

=== Coaching staff ===
Position	Name
Head Coach	(Spain) Iñigo Calderón
Assistant Coaches	(Hong Kong) Fernando Recio
Assistant Coaches	(Hong Kong) Yeung Ching Kwong
Goalkeeper Coach	(Hong Kong) Guo Jianqiao
Strength and Conditioning Lead Coach	(Spain) David Ramos
Technical Analyst	(Hong Kong) Seb Buddle
Women team head coach	(Hong Kong) Paulinho
Women U18 youth team coach	(Hong Kong) Paulinho
Kitchee academy coach	(Hong Kong) Gao Wen
Club consultant doctor	(Hong Kong) Dr. Yung Shu Hang / (Hong Kong) Samuel Ling
Club consultant dietitian	(Hong Kong) Sylvia Lam

=== Basic information ===
Item	Name
Youth training system and football academy	(Hong Kong) The Kitchee Academy
Training ground	(Hong Kong) Jockey Club Kitchee Centre
Youth football training academy	(Hong Kong) Kitchee Academy powered by (Spain) DV7 Soccer Academy
Kitchee academy honors	The first and only Hong Kong “Two-Star Elite Youth Academy" AFC “Youth Academy of the Year (Boys) 2025”"
Chinese University of Hong Kong (CUHK) Sports Medicine Clinic@Kitchee	The Asian Football Confederation AFC Medical Centre/Clinic of Excellence
Football players diets and nutritional restaurant	(Hong Kong) The Kitchee Bistro
Systematic football & physical training program for young players	Kitchee Top Talent Elite Project for "Hong Kong 2034"
Official fans club	The Blue Wave
Official mascot	Kit Jai (A Little Blue Bird)
Official anthem	We Are Kitchee!
Home stadium for Hong Kong Premier League	(Hong Kong) Tseung Kwan O Sports Ground
Home stadium for AFC Champions League Two	(Hong Kong) Mong Kok Stadium
Youth football training system consultant	(Belgium) Double Pass Company
Training Techniques and Research Sharing Platform	(Qatar) Aspire Academy’s"Aspire in the World Fellows"

== Managerial history ==
Manager	Years	Achievements
(Hong Kong) Chan Fai Hung	1992–1995	
(Taiwan) Chan Hung Ping	2002–2003	– 2002–03 Hong Kong Second Division League
(Hong Kong) Cheng Siu Chung (Hong Kong) Lam Hing Lun	2003–2005	
(Serbia) Dejan Antonić	2005–2007	– 2005–06 Hong Kong League Cup – 2005–06 Hong Kong Senior Shield – 2006–07 Hong Kong League Cup
(Hong Kong) Chu Chi Kwong (caretaker)	2007–2008	
(Chile) Julio César Moreno	2008–2009	
(Hong Kong) Cheng Siu Chung (caretaker) (2)	2009	
(Spain) Josep Gombau	2009–2013	– 2010–11 Hong Kong First Division League – 2011–12 Hong Kong First Division League – 2011–12 Hong Kong FA Cup – 2011–12 Hong Kong League Cup – 2012–13 Hong Kong FA Cup
(Spain) Àlex Gómez	2013	
(Hong Kong) Chu Chi Kwong (caretaker) (2) (Hong Kong) Cheng Siu Chung (caretaker) (3)	2013–2014	– 2013–14 Hong Kong First Division League
Hong Kong Premier League era (2014–present)
(Spain) José Francisco Molina	2014–2015	– 2014–15 Hong Kong Premier League – 2014–15 Hong Kong FA Cup – 2014–15 Hong Kong League Cup
(Spain) Abraham García	2015–2016	
(Hong Kong) Chu Chi Kwong (4)	2016–2019	– 2015–16 Hong Kong League Cup – 2016–17 Hong Kong Premier League – 2016–17 Hong Kong FA Cup – 2016–17 Hong Kong Senior Shield – 2017–18 Hong Kong Premier League – 2017–18 Hong Kong FA Cup – 2017–18 Hong Kong Sapling Cup – 2018–19 Hong Kong Senior Shield – 2018–19 Hong Kong FA Cup
(Bosnia and Herzegovina) Blaž Slišković	2019–2020	
(Hong Kong) Chu Chi Kwong (5)	2020–2021	– 2019–20 Hong Kong Premier League – 2019–20 Hong Kong Sapling Cup
(South Korea) Kim Dong-jin (interim)	2021–2022	
(Hong Kong) Chu Chi Kwong (6)	2022–2023	– 2022–23 Hong Kong Premier League – 2022–23 Hong Kong FA Cup – 2022–23 Hong Kong Senior Shield
(South Korea) Kim Dong-jin (interim) (2)	2023–2024	– 2023–24 Hong Kong Senior Shield – 2023–24 Hong Kong Premier League Committee Cup
(Portugal) Edgar Cardoso	2024–2025	
(Spain) Iñigo Calderón	2025–present	

== Honours ==
Type	Competition	Titles	Season
League	Hong Kong Premier League	7	2014–15, 2016–17, 2017–18, 2019–20, 2020–21, 2022–23, 2025–26
League	Hong Kong First Division	6	1947–48, 1949–50, 1963–64, 2010–11, 2011–12, 2013–14
League	Hong Kong Second Division (Note: Upon its formation in 2014, Hong Kong Premier League became the top tier of Hong Kong football; the First and Second Divisions then became the second and third tiers, respectively.)	3	1950–51, 1991–92, 2002–03
League	Hong Kong Third Division	1	1997–98
Cup	Hong Kong FA Cup	7	2011–12, 2012–13, 2014–15, 2016–17, 2017–18, 2018–19, 2022–23
Cup	Hong Kong League Cup	5	2005–06, 2006–07, 2011–12, 2014–15, 2015–16
Cup	Hong Kong Senior Shield	9	1949–50, 1953–54, 1959–60, 1963–64, 2005–06, 2016–17, 2018–19, 2022–23, 2023–24
Cup	Hong Kong Sapling Cup	2	2017–18, 2019–20
Cup	Hong Kong Premier League Committee Cup	1	2023–24
Cup	Hong Kong Junior Shield	2	1951–52, 1998–99
Cup	Hong Kong Community Cup	3	2009, 2017, 2018

Bold is for those competition that are currently active.

== Season by season record ==
Season	League	League Position	Senior Shield	FA Cup	League Cup	Season Play-offs	Community Cup	Asia Tournament		Top scorer(s) and Goals		Notes
1938–39	Third Division	—	Did not enter	Not held	Not held	Not held	Not held	Not held		—	—	Promoted
1946–47	Second Division	—	Did not enter	Not held	Not held	Not held	Not held	Not held		—	—	Promoted
1947–48	First Division	Champion	—	Not held	Not held	Not held	Not held	Not held		—	—	—
1949–50	First Division	Champion	Champion	Not held	Not held	Not held	Not held	Not held		—	—	Double Champions
1950–51	Second Division	Champion	Did not enter	Not held	Not held	Not held	Not held	Not held		—	—	—
1951–52	Second Division	—	—	Not held	Not held	Not held	Not held	Not held		—	—	Junior Shield Champion
1953–54	First Division	—	Champion	Not held	Not held	Not held	Not held	Not held		—	—	—
1959–60	First Division	—	Champion	Not held	Not held	Not held	Not held	Not held		—	—	—
1963–64	First Division	Champion	Champion	Not held	Not held	Not held	Not held	Not held		—	—	Double Champions
1964–65	First Division	—	—	Not held	Not held	Not held	Not held	Not held		—	—	Relegated
1971–72	First Division	—	—	Not held	Not held	Not held	Not held	Did not enter		—	—	Relegated
1990–91	Third Division	—	Did not enter	—	Not held	Not held	Not held	Did not enter		—	—	Promoted
1991–92	Second Division	Champion	Did not enter	—	Not held	Not held	Not held	Did not enter		—	—	Promoted
1993–94	First Division	—	—	—	Not held	Not held	Not held	Did not enter		—	—	Relegated
1995–96	Second Division	—	Did not enter	—	Not held	Not held	Not held	Did not enter		—	—	Relegated
1997–98	Third Division	Champion	Did not enter	—	Not held	Not held	Not held	Did not enter		—	—	Promoted
1998–99	Second Division	—	—	—	Not held	Not held	Not held	Did not enter		—	—	Junior Shield Champion
1999–2000	First Division	8th	—	—	Not held	Not held	Not held	Did not enter		—	—	Relegated
2002–03	Second Division	Champion	Did not enter	—	—	Not held	Not held	Did not enter		—	—	Promoted
2003–04	First Division	Runners-up	Second round	Runners-up	Group stage	Not held	Not held	Did not enter		—	—	—
2004–05	First Division	3rd	Semi-finals	Semi-finals	Group stage	Not held	Not held	Did not enter		—	—	—
2005–06	First Division	4th	Champion	1st round	Champion	Not held	Not held	Did not enter		(Saint Kitts and Nevis) Keith Gumbs	15	Double Champions
2006–07	First Division	Runners-up	Semi-finals	Semi-finals	Champion	Not held	Not held	Did not enter		(Saint Kitts and Nevis) Keith Gumbs	13	—
2007–08	First Division	6th	Runners-up	Quarter-finals	Runners-up	Not held	Not held	2008 AFC Cup	Group stage	(North Macedonia) Goran Stankovski	12	—
2008–09	First Division	Runners-up	Quarter-finals	Quarter-finals	Semi-finals	Not held	Not held	Did not enter		(Cameroon) Paul Ngue	14	—
2009–10	First Division	3rd	Runners-up	1st round	Not held	Not held	Champion	Did not enter		(Equatorial Guinea) Baruc Nsue	7	—
2010–11	First Division	Champion	Quarter-finals	1st round	Semi-finals	Not held	Not held	2010 Singapore Cup	Quarter-finals	(Spain) Jordi Tarrés	15	Double Champions
2011–12	First Division	Champion	1st round	Champion	Champion	Not held	Not held	2012 AFC Cup	Round of 16	(Spain) Roberto Losada	13	Treble Champions
2012–13	First Division	Runners-up	Quarter-finals	Champion	Not held	Champion	Not held	2013 AFC Cup	Quarter-finals	(Spain) Jordi Tarrés	18	Double Champions
2013–14	First Division	Champion	1st round	Runners-up	Not held	Did not enter	Not held	2014 AFC Cup	Semi-finals	(Spain) Juan Belencoso	22	—

=== Premier League era ===
Season	Premier League	Senior Shield	FA Cup	League Cup	Sapling Cup	Season Play-offs	Community Cup	HKPLC Cup	Asia Tournament		Top scorer(s) and Goals		Notes
2014–15	Champion	Runners-up	Champion	Champion	Not held	Did not enter	Runners-up	Not held	2015 AFC Champions League; 2015 AFC Cup	Pre. round 2 Quarter-finals	(Spain) Juan Belencoso	34	Treble Champions
2015–16	Runners-up	Semi-finals	Quarter-finals	Champion	Group stage	Champion	Runners-up	Not held	2016 AFC Champions League; 2016 AFC Cup	Pre. round 2 Round of 16	(Spain) Rufino Segovia	17	Double Champions
2016–17	Champion	Champion	Champion	Defunct	first round	Did not enter	Runners-up	Not held	2017 AFC Champions League	Play-off round	(Hong Kong) Sandro	25	Treble Champions
2017–18	Champion	Semi-finals	Champion	Defunct	Champion	Defunct	Champion	Not held	2018 AFC Champions League	Group stage	(Brazil) Lucas Silva (Hong Kong) Sandro	16	Quadruple Champions
2018–19	4th	Champion	Champion	Defunct	Group; Stage	Defunct	Champion	Not held	2019 AFC Cup	East Asia Zone; Group stage	(Brazil) Fernando (Brazil) Lucas Silva	17	Treble Champions
2019–20	Champion	Quarter-finals	Quarter-finals	Defunct	Champion	Defunct	Defunct	Not held	Cancelled due to COVID-19 pandemic		(Brazil) Wellingsson	14	Double Champions
2020–21	Champion	Cancelled due to COVID-19 pandemic		Defunct	Semi-finals	Defunct	Defunct	Not held	2021 AFC Champions League	Group stage	(Montenegro) Dejan Damjanović	21	—
2021–22	Cancelled due to COVID-19 pandemic			Defunct		Defunct	Defunct	Not held	2022 AFC Champions League	East Asia Quarter-finals	(Montenegro) Dejan Damjanović	15	—
2022–23	Champion	Champion	Champion	Defunct	Group stage	Defunct	Defunct	Not held	Not held		(Montenegro) Dejan Damjanović	25	Treble Champions
2023–24	4th	Champion	Semi-finals	Defunct	Runners-up	Defunct	Defunct	Champion	2023–24 AFC Champions League	Group stage	(Brazil) Mikael	26	Double Champions
2024–25	4th	Semi-finals	Quarter-finals	Defunct	Group stage	Defunct	Defunct	Defunct	Did not enter		(Uzbekistan) Sherzod Temirov	15	—
2025–26	Champion	Quarter-finals	Quarter-finals	Runners-up	Defunct	Defunct	Defunct	Defunct	Did not enter		(Spain) Adrián Revilla	13	—
2026–27		Quarter-finals			Defunct	Defunct	Defunct	Defunct	2026–27 AFC Champions League Two				

== Continental record ==
=== AFC competitions ===
All results list Kitchee's goal tally first.

Win	Draw	Loss

Season	Competition	Round	Club	Home	Away	Aggregate
2008	AFC Cup	Group E	(Malaysia) Perak	2–2	1–2	3rd
2008	AFC Cup	Group E	(Maldives) New Radiant	2–0	1–2	3rd
2008	AFC Cup	Group E	Singapore Armed Forces	0–2	0–4	3rd
2012	AFC Cup	Group F	(Singapore) Tampines Rovers	3–1	0–0	1st
2012	AFC Cup	Group F	(Malaysia) Terengganu	2–2	2–0	1st
2012	AFC Cup	Group F	(Vietnam) Sông Lam Nghệ An	2–0	0–1	1st
2012	AFC Cup	Round of 16	(Indonesia) Arema	0–2		
2013	AFC Cup	Group E	(India) Churchill Brothers	3–0	4–0	2nd
2013	AFC Cup	Group E	(Singapore) Warriors	5–0	4–2	2nd
2013	AFC Cup	Group E	(Indonesia) Semen Padang	1–2	1–3	2nd
2013	AFC Cup	Round of 16	(Malaysia) Kelantan	2–0		
2013	AFC Cup	Quarter-finals	(Jordan) Al-Faisaly	1–2	1–2	2–4
2014	AFC Cup	Group H	(Singapore) Tampines Rovers	4–0	5–0	1st
2014	AFC Cup	Group H	(Myanmar) Nay Pyi Taw	2–0	2–1	1st
2014	AFC Cup	Group H	(India) Pune	2–2	0–2	1st
2014	AFC Cup	Round of 16	(Indonesia) Arema Cronus	2–0		
2014	AFC Cup	Quarter-finals	(Vietnam) Vissai Ninh Bình	0–1	4–2	4–3
2014	AFC Cup	Semi-finals	(Iraq) Erbil	1–2	1–1 (Note: Played at a neutral venue.)	2–3
2015	AFC Champions League	Preliminary Round 2	(Thailand) Chonburi	1–4		
2015	AFC Cup	Group F	(Singapore) Balestier Khalsa	3–0	2–1	2nd
2015	AFC Cup	Group F	(India) East Bengal	2–2	1–1	2nd
2015	AFC Cup	Group F	(Malaysia) Johor Darul Ta'zim	2–0	0–2	2nd
2015	AFC Cup	Round of 16	(Indonesia) Persib Bandung	2–0		
2015	AFC Cup	Quarter-finals	Al-Kuwait	1–1	0–6	1–7
2016	AFC Champions League	Preliminary Round 2	(Vietnam) Hanoi FC	0–1		
2016	AFC Cup	Group F	(Philippines) Kaya FC	1–0	1–0	1st
2016	AFC Cup	Group F	(Maldives) New Radiant	0–0	2–0	1st
2016	AFC Cup	Group F	(Singapore) Balestier Khalsa	4–0	0–1	1st
2016	AFC Cup	Round of 16	(India) Bengaluru FC	2–3		
2017	AFC Champions League	Preliminary Round 2	(Vietnam) Hanoi FC	3–2 (aet)		
2017	AFC Champions League	Play-off Round	(South Korea) Ulsan Hyundai	1–1 (3–4 p)		
2018	AFC Champions League	Group E	(Japan) Kashiwa Reysol	1–0	0–1	4th
2018	AFC Champions League	Group E	(South Korea) Jeonbuk Hyundai Motors	0–6	0–3	4th
2018	AFC Champions League	Group E	(China) Tianjin Quanjin	0–1	0–3	4th
2019	AFC Champions League	Preliminary Round 2	(Malaysia) Perak	1–1 (5–6 p)		
2019	AFC Cup	East Asia Zone Group I	(North Korea) April 25	1–0	0–2	2nd
2019	AFC Cup	East Asia Zone Group I	(Chinese Taipei) Hang Yuen	3–0	2–1	2nd
2019	AFC Cup	East Asia Zone Group I	(Hong Kong) Tai Po	2–4	3–3	2nd
2020	AFC Cup	East Asia Zone Group I	(Chinese Taipei) Tatung FC	Cancelled due to COVID-19 pandemic		
2020	AFC Cup	East Asia Zone Group I	(Macau) MUST CPK	Cancelled due to COVID-19 pandemic		
2020	AFC Cup	East Asia Zone Group I	(Chinese Taipei) / (Mongolia) Winners of Play-off East Asia	Cancelled due to COVID-19 pandemic		
2021	AFC Champions League	Group J	(China) Guangzhou FC	1–0	1–0	2nd
2021	AFC Champions League	Group J	(Thailand) Port FC	2–0	1–1	2nd
2021	AFC Champions League	Group J	(Japan) Cerezo Osaka	0–0	1–2	2nd
2022	AFC Champions League	Group J	(Thailand) Chiangrai United	1–0	3–2	2nd
2022	AFC Champions League	Group J	(Japan) Vissel Kobe	2–2	1–2	2nd
2022	AFC Champions League	Round of 16	(Thailand) BG Pathum United	0–4		
2023–24	AFC Champions League	Group F	(Singapore) Lion City Sailors	1–2	2–0	4th
2023–24	AFC Champions League	Group F	(Thailand) Bangkok United	1–2	1–1	4th
2023–24	AFC Champions League	Group F	(South Korea) Jeonbuk Hyundai Motors	1–2	1–2	4th
2026–27	AFC Champions League Two	Group H	(South Korea) Gangwon FC	0–0	–	
2026–27	AFC Champions League Two	Group H	(Malaysia) Kuching City	–	1–1	
2026–27	AFC Champions League Two	Group H	(Cambodia) Phnom Penh Crown	2–1	0–2	

=== Asia Football Clubs Ranking ===
Asia Football Clubs Ranking	Team Name	Total Points	One year change	Club Ranking History Chart	Reference	Notes
180	Kitchee SC	1290	+0 points			Updated on 1 July 2025

=== Friendlies and invitational tournaments ===
All results list Kitchee's goal tally first.

Win	Draw	Loss

Season	Competition	Round	Club	First leg	Second leg	Aggregate
2004		Friendly	(Italy) AC Milan	2–1		
2004		Friendly	(England) Newcastle United	1–1 (6–7 penalties)		
2005	Hong Kong–Shanghai Cup	Friendly	(China) Shanghai Shenhua	0–1		
2005		Friendly	(Italy) Juventus	2–2 (5–3 penalties)		
2010	Lunar New Year Cup	Friendly	(South Korea) Pohang Steelers	1–1		
2010		Friendly	(Spain) Villarreal B	1–2		
2010		Friendly	(Spain) Barcelona B	3–3		
2010		Friendly	(Spain) Espanyol B	0–5		
2010		Friendly	(Spain) CF Amposta	1–1		
2010	Singapore Cup	Preliminary Round	(China) Beijing Guoan Talent	2–1 (aet)		
2010	Singapore Cup	Quarter-finals	(France) Etoile FC	4–4	0–2	4–6
2010	Canon Cup	Friendly	(Spain) Villarreal	0–3		
2011	Premier League Asia Trophy	Semi-finals	(England) Chelsea	0–4		
2011	Premier League Asia Trophy	Third-place playoff	(England) Blackburn Rovers	0–3		
2012	Hong Kong–Shanghai Inter Club Championship	Friendly	(China) Shanghai Tellace	0–4	2–3	2–7
2012	The HKJC Charity Trust Challenge Cup	Friendly	(England) Arsenal	2–2		
2012		Friendly	(Spain) Gimnàstic de Tarragona	0–1		
2012		Friendly	(Spain) Villarreal B	2–0		
2013		Friendly	(England) Manchester United	2–5		
2014	Hong Kong–Shanghai Inter Club Championship	Friendly	(China) Shanghai SIPG	1–6	0–0	1–6
2014	Meeting Of CHAMPIONS	Friendly	(France) Paris Saint-Germain	2–6		
2017	Lunar New Year Cup	Semi-finals	(Thailand) Muangthong United	1–1 (5–4 penalties)		
2017	Lunar New Year Cup	Final	(New Zealand) Auckland City	0–1		
2017	Jockey Club Kitchee Centre Challenge Cup	Friendly	(England) Tottenham Hotspur	1–4		
2019	HKJC Kitchee Centre Cup	Friendly	(England) Manchester City	1–6		
2024	BOC Life Cup	Friendly	(Spain) Atlético Madrid	1–6		
