= Juan Belencoso =

Spanish footballer

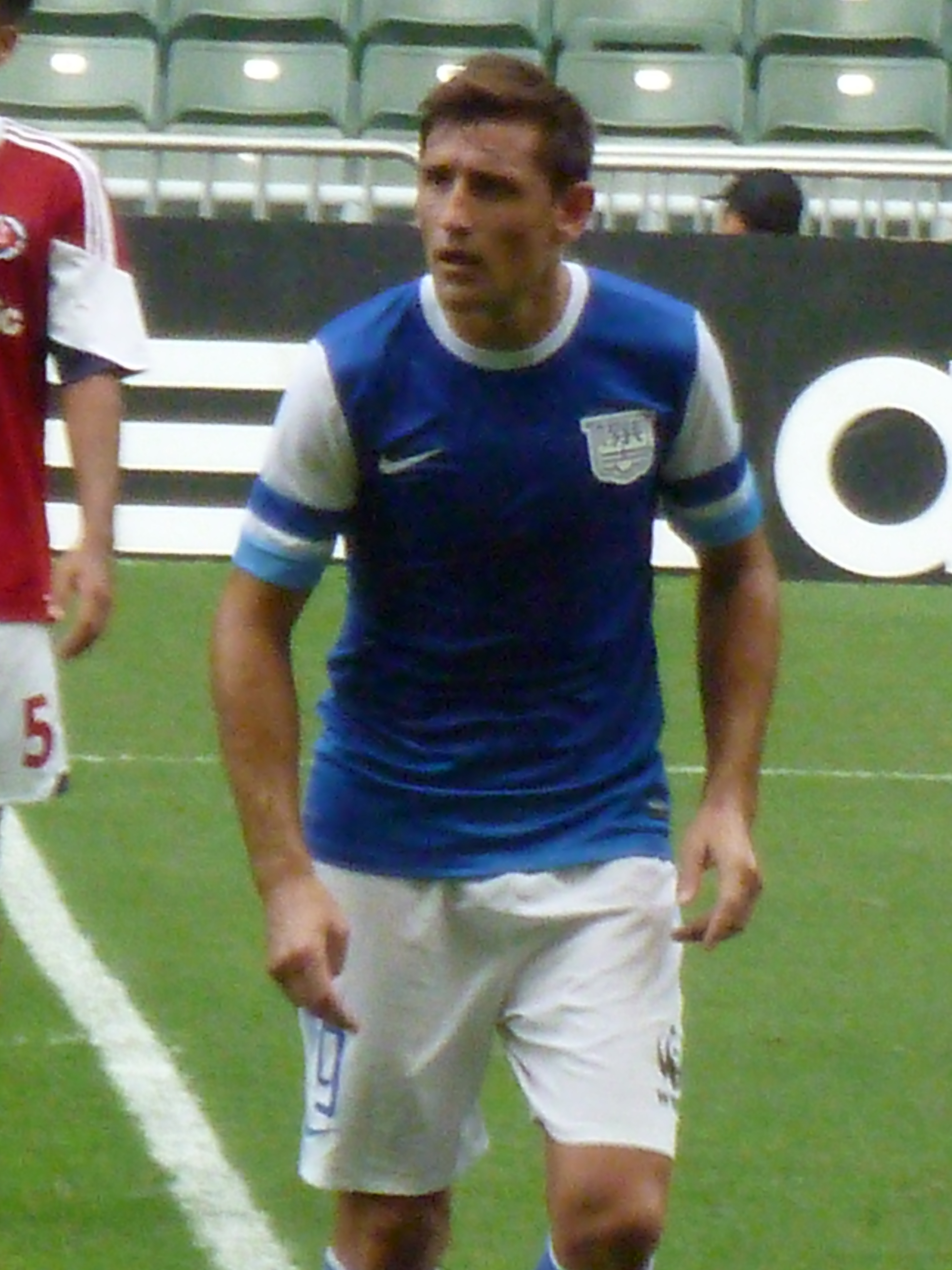
- Belencoso with Kitchee in 2013

Personal information
- Full name: Juan Carlos Rodríguez Belencoso
- Date of birth: 1 September 1981 (age 45)
- Place of birth: Elche de la Sierra, Spain
- Height: 1.86 m (6 ft 1 in)
- Position: Forward

Senior career*
Years	Team	Apps	(Gls)
2000–2001	Rayo Cantabria	28	(12)
2001–2002	Chaves	12	(2)
2002–2004	Jaén	52	(6)
2004–2006	Mérida	55	(26)
2006	Hospitalet	16	(2)
2006–2007	Linense	38	(17)
2007–2008	Baza	38	(16)
2008–2010	Albacete	34	(2)
2010–2011	Conquense	39	(12)
2011–2012	Lugo	41	(14)
2012–2013	Cádiz	27	(4)
2013–2015	Kitchee	39	(30)
2015–2016	Persib Bandung	11	(0)
2016	ATK	16	(2)
2017	Socuéllamos	9	(3)
2017–2018	Mar Menor	34	(21)
2018–2019	Socuéllamos	41	(18)
2019–2020	Villanovense	24	(8)
2020–2021	Minerva	29	(9)
2021–2024	La Unión Atlético	83	(17)
2024	Atlético Pulpileño	16	(5)
2024–2025	Minerva	18	(4)
- * Club domestic league appearances and goals

Juan Carlos Rodríguez Belencoso (born 1 September 1981) is a Spanish former footballer who played as a forward.

== Club career ==
Born in Elche de la Sierra, Albacete, Belencoso started playing as a senior with amateurs Deportivo Rayo Cantabria. From 2002 to 2008, following a brief spell in Portugal, he competed mainly in the Segunda División B, representing at that level Real Jaén, Mérida UD, CE L'Hospitalet and CD Baza.

Aged 27, Belencoso reached Segunda División for the first time in the 2008–09 season, signing with local Castile-La Mancha club Albacete Balompié. He made his debut in the competition on 31 August 2008, coming in as a late substitute in a 2–1 home win against Sevilla Atlético, but only scored twice in the league over the course of two full seasons.

Belencoso returned to division three for the following years, playing with UB Conquense, CD Lugo and Cádiz CF. He achieved promotion with the second team after scoring 14 goals, three in the playoffs.

On 9 July 2013, Belencoso became coach Àlex Gómez's first foreign signing of the new campaign as he joined Kitchee SC in Hong Kong. He made an impressive start to his First Division League adventure, netting twice and providing two assists in a 6–2 victory over Sun Hei SC on 3 September.

== Career statistics ==
As of 22 December 2016

Club	Season	League			Cup		Other		Total	
Club	Season	Division	Apps	Goals	Apps	Goals	Apps	Goals	Apps	Goals
Chaves	2001–02	Segunda Liga	12	2	1	0	0	0	13	2
Chaves	Total		12	2	1	0	0	0	13	2
Jaén	2002–03	Segunda División B	17	2	0	0	0	0	17	2
Jaén	2003–04	Segunda División B	36	5	0	0	0	0	36	5
Jaén	Total		53	7	0	0	0	0	53	7
Mérida	2005–06	Segunda División B	14	0	3	1	0	0	17	1
Mérida	Total		14	0	3	1	0	0	17	1
Hospitalet	2005–06	Segunda División B	16	2	0	0	0	0	16	2
Hospitalet	Total		16	2	0	0	0	0	16	2
Linense	2006–07	Tercera División	38	17	0	0	0	0	38	17
Linense	Total		38	17	0	0	0	0	38	17
Baza	2007–08	Segunda División B	36	16	0	0	2	0	38	16
Baza	Total		36	16	0	0	2	0	38	16
Albacete	2008–09	Segunda División	20	1	1	0	0	0	21	1
Albacete	2009–10	Segunda División	14	1	0	0	0	0	14	1
Albacete	Total		34	2	1	0	0	0	35	2
Conquense	2010–11	Segunda División B	37	11	0	0	2	1	39	12
Conquense	Total		37	11	0	0	2	1	39	2
Lugo	2011–12	Segunda División B	35	11	1	0	6	3	42	14
Lugo	Total		35	11	1	0	6	3	42	14
Cádiz	2012–13	Segunda División B	27	4	2	0	0	0	29	4
Cádiz	Total		27	4	2	0	0	0	29	4
Kitchee	2013–14	First Division League	17	16	2	0	6	8	25	24
Kitchee	2014–15	Hong Kong Premier League	15	13	7	11	12	7	34	31
Kitchee	2015–16	Hong Kong Premier League	7	1	3	2	10	5	20	8
Kitchee	Total		39	30	12	13	28	20	79	63
Persib Bandung	2016	Indonesia Soccer Championship	8	0	6	1	0	0	14	1
Persib Bandung	Total		8	0	6	1	0	0	14	1
ATK	2016	Indian Super League	16	2	0	0	0	0	16	2
ATK	Total		16	2	0	0	0	0	16	2
Career total			365	104	26	14	38	24	429	142
