= Paulinho (footballer, born January 1983) =

Hong Kong footballer

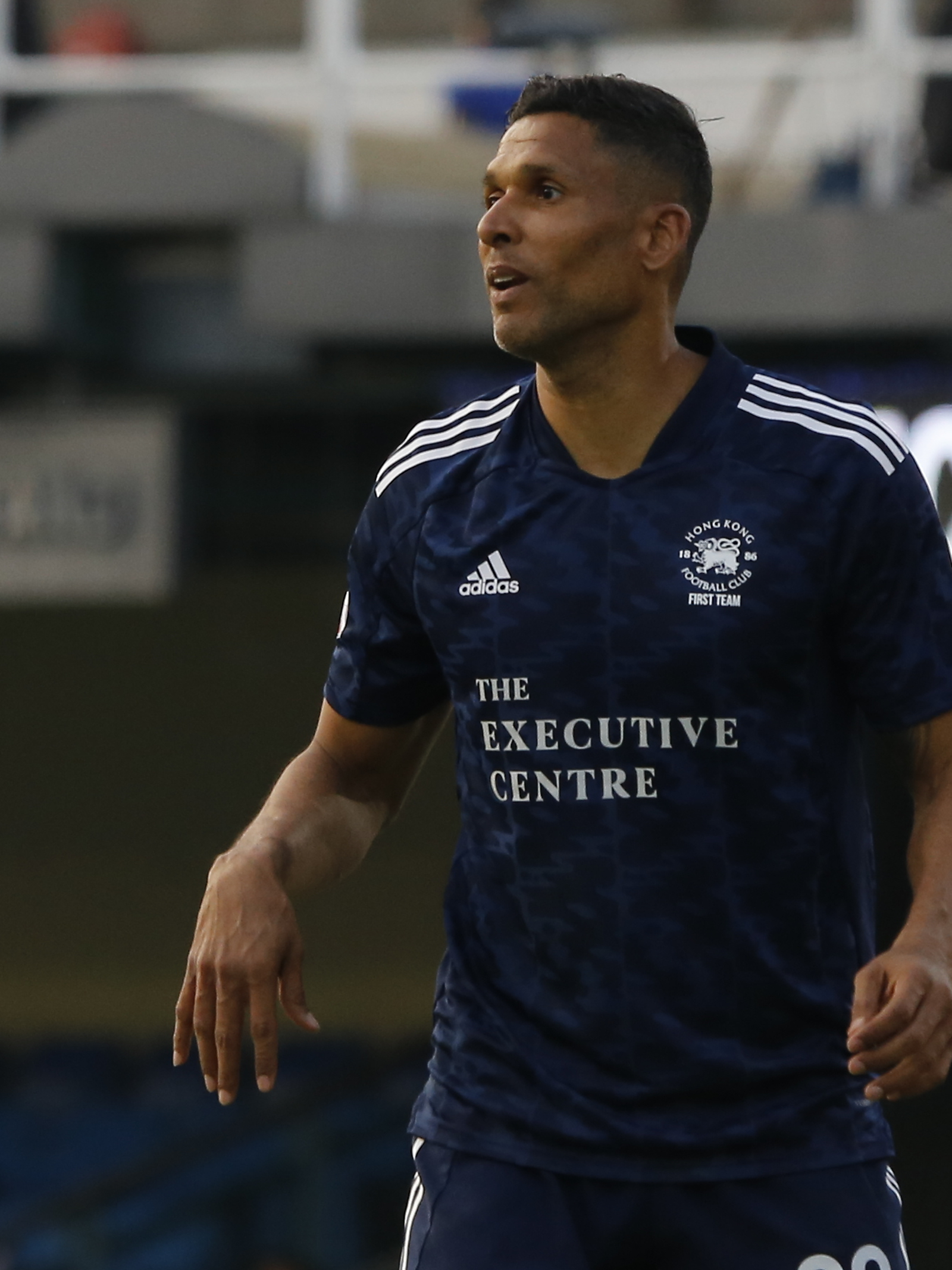
- Paulinho with HKFC in 2023

Personal information
- Full name: Paulo Robspierry Carreiro
- Date of birth: 16 January 1983 (age 43)
- Place of birth: Piracicaba, São Paulo, Brazil
- Height: 1.80 m (5 ft 11 in)
- Positions: Attacking midfielder; striker

Senior career*
| Years | Team | Apps | (Gls) |
| 2007–2008 | Olímpia | | |
| 2008–2014 | Citizen | 85 | (22) |
| 2014–2015 | Kitchee | 17 | (6) |
| 2016–2017 | Shenzhen FC | 4 | (0) |
| 2017–2018 | Kitchee | 8 | (4) |
| 2018–2019 | R&F | 14 | (0) |
| 2020–2021 | Fu Moon | 2 | (2) |
| 2022–2024 | HKFC | 26 | (5) |
| 2024–2025 | Citizen | 20 | (14) |

International career^{‡}
| 2015–2016 | Hong Kong | 4 | (1) |

Managerial career
- 2024–2025: HKFC (assistant coach)
- * Club domestic league appearances and goals as of 30 June 2025 ‡ National team caps and goals as of 24 March 2016

Paulo Robspierry Carreiro
- Traditional Chinese: 福保羅
Transcriptions
Yue: Cantonese
- Jyutping: Fuk1 Bou2lo4
- IPA: [fʊk̚˥ pɔw˧˥ lɔ˩]

Paulinho
- Traditional Chinese: 保連奴
Transcriptions
Yue: Cantonese
- Jyutping: Bou2 Lin4nou4
- IPA: [pɔw˧˥ lin˩ nɔw˩]

Paulo Robspierry Carreiro (Chinese: 福保羅; born 16 January 1983), commonly known as Paulinho (Brazilian Portuguese: [pawˈlĩɲu]; Chinese: 保連奴) or Paulinho Piracicaba, is a former professional footballer who played as an attacking midfielder or a striker. Born in Brazil, he represented Hong Kong internationally.

== Club career ==
=== Shenzhen FC ===
On 31 December 2015, Paulinho transferred to China League One side Shenzhen FC for a 7 unit fee and commanded a 2-year deal. However, due to his recurring injury issues at the club, Paulinho would sit out for most of the season and would make his debut in the league against Qingdao Jonoon until he was subbed off in the 74th minute. Due to his injuries issues again, he would be sent to the Netherlands for surgery twice and making 4 appearances for Shenzhen as a total.

=== Kitchee ===
On 12 July 2017, Kitchee announced that Paulinho would return to the club. Paulinho would make his 2nd debut for the club against Yuen Long as a substitute coming in to replace Lam Zhi Gin in the 63rd minute and helping Kitchee gain a 3–0 victory. He would score his first goal in his return against Rangers, scoring a header 91 minutes in to assist Kitchee in 1 7–0 victory.

=== R&F ===
On 7 August 2018, Paulinho left Kitchee after one season to sign with R&F. He was released at the end of his contract on 19 June 2019.

=== HKFC ===
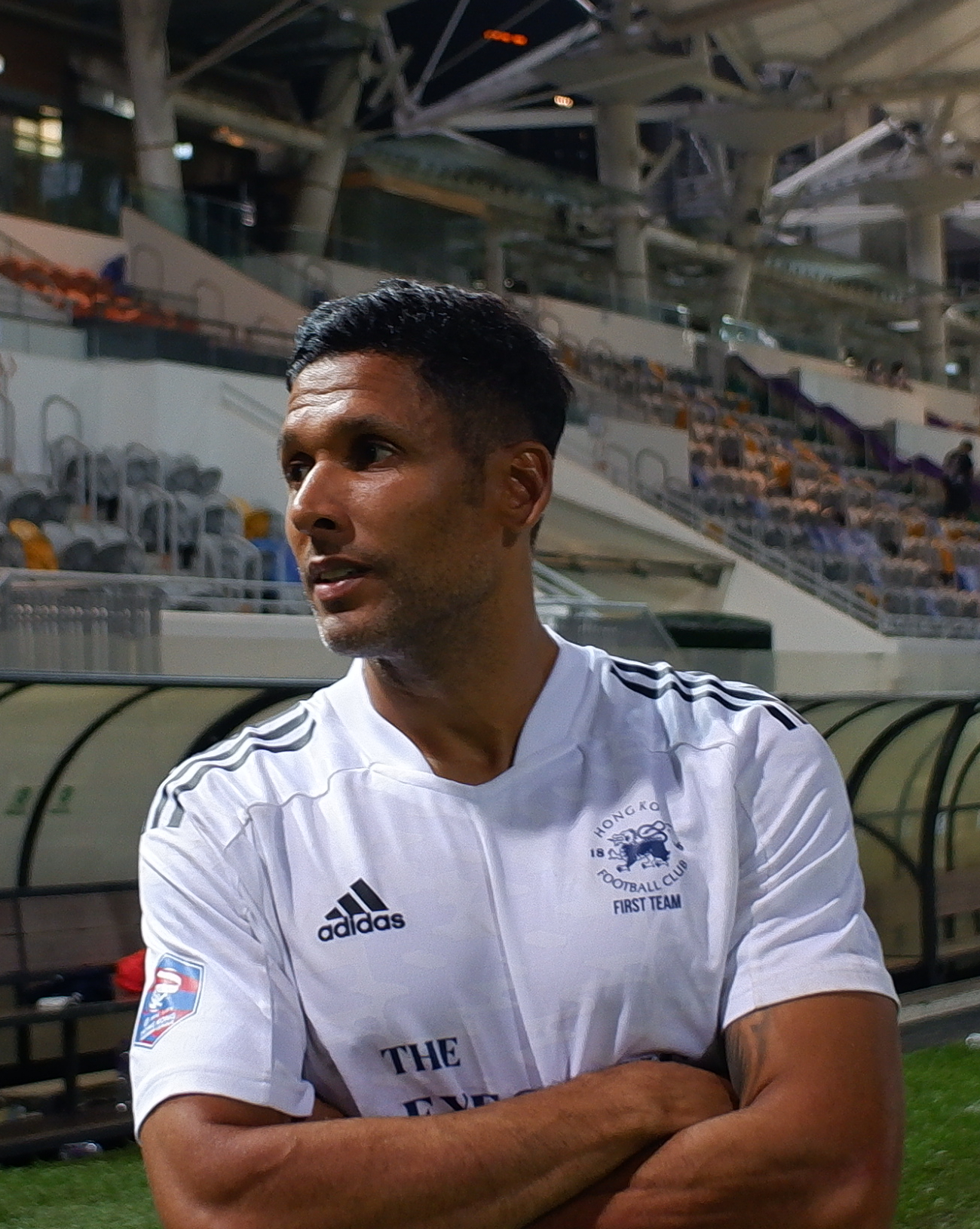
Paulinho with HKFC

In October 2022, Paulinho returned to the top flight and joined HKFC.

On 6 November 2022, Paulinho made his debut for HKFC in the Hong Kong Sapling Cup and scored twice to finish off his debut against Tai Po.

Paulinho retired from professional football at the end of the 2023–24 season. He became the assistant coach and the U-18 manager of the club for the Hong Kong Youth Premier League squad.

== International career ==
Paulinho was born and raised in Brazil, but became a naturalized Hong Kong citizen. Paulinho acquired his HKSAR passport on 31 October 2015, making him eligible to represent Hong Kong on the international level.

Paulinho made his international debut for Hong Kong in a friendly against Myanmar on 7 November 2015 and scored his first goal against Maldives in 2018 FIFA World Cup qualification – AFC second round on 12 November 2015.

== Career statistics ==
=== International ===
As of 24 March 2016

| National team | Year | Apps | Goals |
|---|---|---|---|
| Hong Kong | 2015 | 3 | 1 |
| Hong Kong | 2016 | 1 | 0 |
| Total | | 4 | 1 |

=== International goals ===
Scores and results list Hong Kong's goal tally first.

| Goal | Date | Venue | Opponent | Score | Result | Competition |
|---|---|---|---|---|---|---|
| 1. | 12 November 2015 | National Football Stadium, Malé, Maldives | Maldives | 1–0 | 1–0 | 2018 FIFA World Cup qualification |

== Honours ==
=== Club ===
Citizen

- Hong Kong Senior Shield: 2010–11

Kitchee

- Hong Kong Premier League: 2014–15, 2017–18
- Hong Kong FA Cup: 2017–18
- Hong Kong Sapling Cup: 2017–18
- Hong Kong League Cup: 2014–15

=== Individual ===
- Hong Kong Senior Shield: Top scorer 2010–11

Awards
| Preceded by Chan Siu Ki | Hong Kong Senior Shield; Top Scorer; 2010–11 | Succeeded by Itaparica |
