= Fernando Recio =

Spanish-born Hong Kong footballer

Fernando Recio 列斯奧
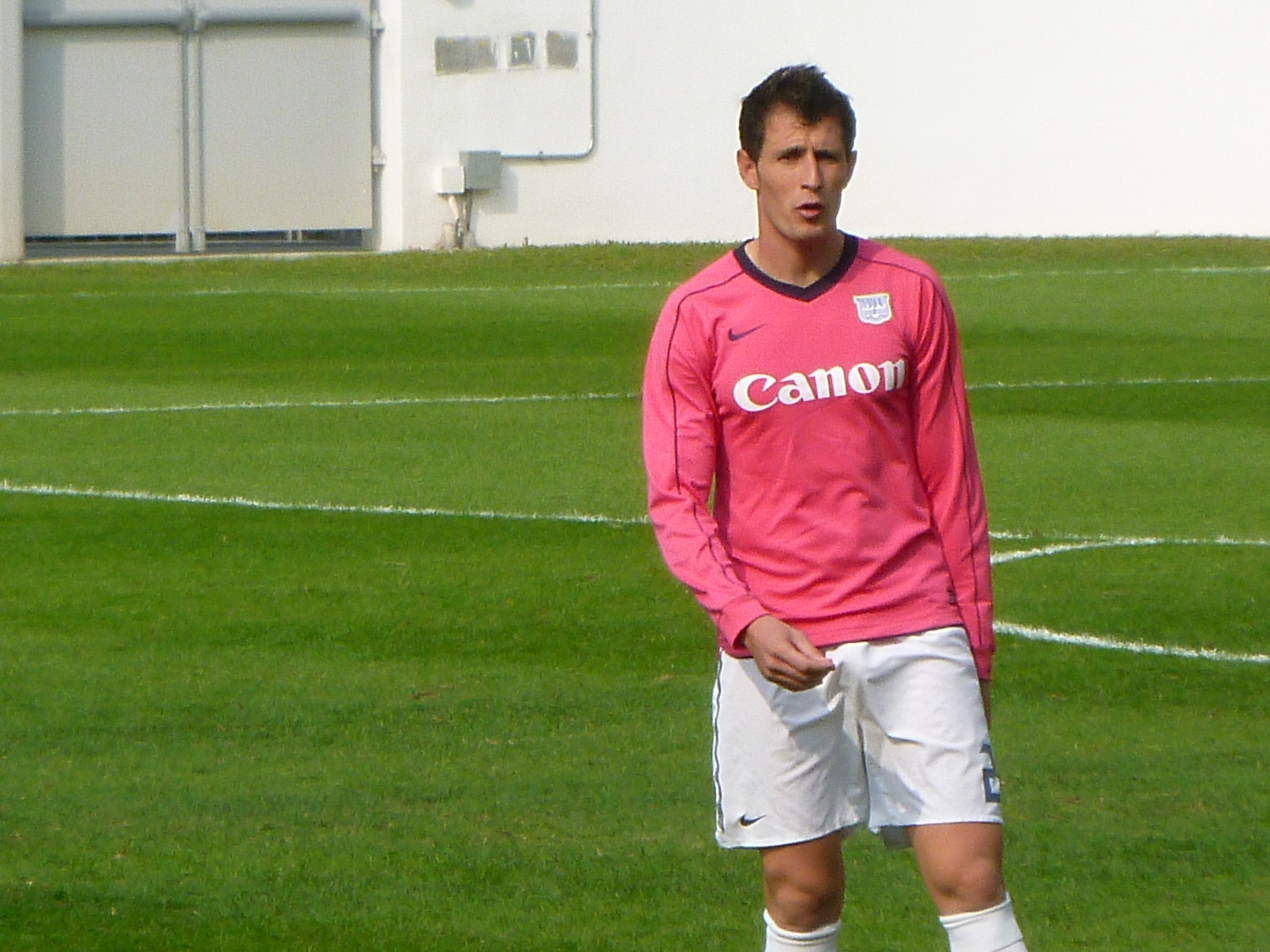
- Recio in action for Kitchee in 2012

Personal information
- Full name: Fernando Recio Comí
- Date of birth: 17 December 1982 (age 43)
- Place of birth: Barcelona, Spain
- Height: 1.84 m (6 ft 0 in)
- Position: Centre-back

Team information
- Current team: Kitchee (assistant)

Senior career*
Years	Team	Apps	(Gls)
2003–2006	Rapitenca		
2006–2009	Amposta		
2009–2010	Tortosa	31	(1)
2010–2019	Kitchee	98	(4)
2016–2017	→ Hong Kong Rangers (loan)	14	(0)
2019–2024	Lee Man	36	(2)

International career
2017	Hong Kong	4	(0)

Managerial career
- 2024–: Kitchee (assistant)
- * Club domestic league appearances and goals

Fernando Recio Comí (Chinese: 列斯奧; born 17 December 1982) is a former professional footballer who played as a centre-back. He is currently the assistant coach of Hong Kong Premier League club Kitchee.

Born in Spain, he spent most of his professional career with Kitchee in Hong Kong after signing in 2010, eventually going on to represent the Hong Kong national team.

== Club career ==
=== Kitchee ===
Born in Barcelona, Catalonia, Recio only played amateur football in his country, representing Rapitenca, Amposta and Tortosa. In June 2010 he was signed by Kitchee in Hong Kong, reuniting with his former teammate – at the first two teams – Ubay Luzardo (also a stopper); the club's manager, compatriot Josep Gombau, had tried to acquire the player in the previous transfer window, but failed.

On 17 October 2013, general manager Ken Ng announced that Recio had renewed his contract until 2016. On 29 May of the following year, he won the Hong Kong Footballer of the Year Award for the 2013–14 season, receiving a HK$35,000 prize.

Following victory in the 2018–19 Hong Kong FA Cup, Recio left Kitchee.

=== Lee Man ===
On 19 July 2019, Recio signed for fellow Hong Kong Premier League side Lee Man. In May 2024, the 41-year-old retired.

== International career ==
Recio received his Hong Kong passport in October 2017 at the age of 34, alongside fellow Spaniards Dani Cancela and Jordi Tarrés. He made his debut for the national team on 5 October that year, in a 4–0 friendly win over Laos.

== Career statistics ==
=== Club ===
As of 18 February 2020

Club	Season	League			Cup		Other		Total	
Club	Season	Division	Apps	Goals	Apps	Goals	Apps	Goals	Apps	Goals
Tortosa	2009–10	Tercera División	31	1	0	0	0	0	31	1
Kitchee	2010–11	Hong Kong First Division League	12	0	2	0	0	0	17	0
Kitchee	2011–12	Hong Kong First Division League	15	0	5	1	7	0	27	1
Kitchee	2012–13	Hong Kong First Division League	14	0	6	0	8	0	28	0
Kitchee	2013–14	Hong Kong First Division League	18	2	4	0	6	1	28	3
Kitchee	2014–15	Hong Kong Premier League	11	1	8	0	8	0	27	1
Kitchee	2015–16	Hong Kong Premier League	9	0	9	0	8	0	26	0
Rangers (loan)	2016–17	Hong Kong Premier League	14	0	2	0	0	0	16	0
Kitchee	2017–18	Hong Kong Premier League	12	1	2	0	2	0	16	1
Kitchee	2018–19	Hong Kong Premier League	7	0	2	0	2	0	11	0
Lee Man	2019–20	Hong Kong Premier League	5	1	2	0	0	0	7	1
Career total			148	6	42	1	41	1	231	8

=== International ===
National team	Year	Apps	Goals
Hong Kong	2017	4	0
Total		4	0

== Honours ==
Kitchee

- Hong Kong Premier League: 2014–15, 2016–17, 2017–18
- Hong Kong First Division: 2010–11, 2011–12, 2013–14
- Hong Kong Senior Shield: 2016–17, 2018–19
- Hong Kong FA Cup: 2011–12, 2012–13, 2014–15, 2016–17, 2017–18, 2018–19
- Hong Kong Sapling Cup: 2017–18
- Hong Kong League Cup: 2011–12, 2014–15, 2015–16

Lee Man

- Hong Kong Premier League: 2023–24

Individual

- Hong Kong Footballer of the Year: 2014
