= 2011–12 TSW Pegasus FC season =

TSW Pegasus FC
2011–12 season
- President: (Hong Kong) Wilson Wong
- Head Coach: (Hong Kong) Chan Hiu Ming
- Home Ground: Yuen Long Stadium (Capacity: 4,932)
- League: 1st
- Senior Shield: N/A(Not Begin)
- FA Cup: N/A(Not Begin)
- League Cup: N/A(Not Begin)
Home colours

This season is TSW Pegasus FC's 4th season in First Division League. They will compete in the First Division League, Senior Shield, FA Cup, and League Cup.

== Player ==
=== First Team Squad ===
As of 18 September 2011.

Note: Flags indicate national team as defined under FIFA eligibility rules; some limited exceptions apply. Players may hold more than one non-FIFA nationality.

No.	Pos.	Nation	Player
1	GK	BRA	Roger Kath
2	DF	HKG	Lee Wai Lun
3	DF	BRA	Lucas
4	DF	HKG	Deng Jinghuang
5	DF	AUS	Karl Dodd
6	DF	HKG	Luk Koon Pong (vice-captain)
8	DF	CHN	Fan Qunxiao
9	MF	HKG	Lau Ka Shing
11	MF	BRA	Itaparica (captain)
13	DF	HKG	Cheung Kin Fung
14	MF	HKG	Chan Ming Kong
16	DF	HKG	Lau Nim Yat (on loan from South China)

No.	Pos.	Nation	Player
17	MF	HKG	Lee Hong Lim
19	DF	HKG	Yuen Tsun Nam
20	FW	HKG	Godfred Karikari
21	MF	HKG	Li Ka Chun (on loan from Kitchee)
22	GK	HKG	Yuen Ho Chun
23	FW	HKG	Jaimes Mckee
24	MF	HKG	Ju Ying Zhi
25	DF	HKG	So Wai Chuen
26	MF	HKG	Lai Yiu Cheong
27	GK	JPN	Hisanori Takada
28	FW	BRA	Leandro Carrijo Silva

=== On Loan ===
Note: Flags indicate national team as defined under FIFA eligibility rules; some limited exceptions apply. Players may hold more than one non-FIFA nationality.

No.	Pos.	Nation	Player
8	MF	CMR	Eugene Mbome (at Hong Kong Sapling)

== Fixtures and results ==
=== Pre-season friendly ===
30 July 2011	South China (Hong Kong)	1 – 1	(Hong Kong) TSW Pegasus	Happy Valley
				Stadium: (Hong Kong) Happy Valley Recreation Ground

6 August 2011	TSW Pegasus (Hong Kong)	3 – 0	(Hong Kong) Biu Chun Rangers	Tsing Yi
	Lee Hong Lim; Lau Ka Shing; Carrijo			Stadium: (Hong Kong) Tsing Yi Northeast Park

19 August 2011	TSW Pegasus (Hong Kong)	1 – 2	(Hong Kong) Wofoo Tai Po	Tsing Yi
	McKee		Li Chun Yip; Lima	Stadium: (Hong Kong) Tsing Yi Northeast Park

28 August 2011	Beijing Sport University (China)	2 – 3	(Hong Kong) TSW Pegasus	Beijing, China
	Goal		Lee Wai Lun; Godfred; Lee Hong Lim	Stadium: (China) Beijing Sport University

29 August 2011	Tianjin Teda Reserves (China)	2 – 2	(Hong Kong) TSW Pegasus	Xianghe County, China
	Goal		Carrijo; Chan Ming Kong	Stadium: (China) Xianghe Training Ground

31 August 2011	Tianjin Teda Reserves (China)	1 – 2	(Hong Kong) TSW Pegasus	Xianghe County, China
	Goal		Lee Hong Lim; Cheung Kin Fung	Stadium: (China) Xianghe Training Ground

31 August 2011	Beijing City Sports (China)	0 – 2	(Hong Kong) TSW Pegasus	Xianghe County, China
			Lee Hong Lim; McKee	Stadium: (China) Xianghe Training Ground

31 August 2011	Beijing Dong Ren Automotive (China)	1 – 7	(Hong Kong) TSW Pegasus	Xianghe County, China
			Carrijo; Godfred; Lai Yiu Cheong; McKee	Stadium: (China) Xianghe Training Ground

=== Hong Kong First Division League ===
9 September 2011 Week 1	TSW Pegasus	4 – 1	Biu Chun Rangers	Yuen Long
20:00(GMT+8)	Itaparica 49' (pen.), 60'; Cheung Kin Fung (yellow card) 74'; Godfred 63', 90'	Report	6' Yan Minghao; (yellow card) 69' Liu Songwei; (yellow card) 81' Tong Kin Man; (yellow card) 84' Chan Siu Yuen; (yellow card) 90' Sandro	Stadium: Yuen Long Stadium (Capacity:4,932); Attendance: 1,215; Referee: Ng Chiu Kok; Assistant referees: Pau Sai Yin; Chan Shui Hung; Fourth official: Yu Chun San

17 September 2011 Week 2	TSW Pegasus	4 – 0	Hong Kong Sapling	Yuen Long
17:30(GMT+8)	Itaparica 47'; Lai Yiu Cheong 53'; McKee 60'; Fan Qunxiao (yellow card) 67'; Godfred Karikari 90'		(yellow card) 32' Wong Yim Kwan; (yellow card) 88' Nam Wing Hang	Stadium: Yuen Long Stadium (Capacity:4,932); Attendance: 923; Referee: Cheng Oi Cho; Assistant referees: Pau Sai Yin; Lam Nai Kei; Fourth official: Yu Chun San

24 September 2011 Week 3	Sham Shui Po	0 - 4	TSW Pegasus	Sham Shui Po
14:30(GMT+8)	Fong Pak Lun (yellow card) 72'	Summary	Karikari 27' 76' 90' (yellow card) 79'; Lee Wai Lun (yellow card) 46'; Santos Manoel 59'	Stadium: Sham Shui Po Sports Ground (Capacity:2,194); Attendance: 1,684

16 October 2011 Week 4	Wofoo Tai Po	3 - 1	TSW Pegasus	Tai Po
14:30(GMT+8)	William Carlos 5'; Annan 40'; Lui Chi Hing 45'	Summary	Ka Chun Li (yellow card) 22'; Leandro Carrijo (yellow card) 76' (yellow-red card) 90' (goal) 80'	Stadium: Tai Po Sports Ground (Capacity:3,000); Attendance: 948

23 October 2011 Week 5	Kitchee	3 - 2	TSW Pegasus	Tseung Kwan O
17:30(GMT+8)	Ubay Luzardo 22' (yellow card) 26' (goal) 84'; Daniel Cancela (yellow card) 67'; Tsang Kam To 86'	Summary	Lau Nim Yat (yellow card) 13'; Santos Manoel 29'; Karikari (yellow card) 42'; Dodd (yellow card) 64'; Mckee Jaimes Anthony 69'; Chan Ming Kong (yellow card) 72'; Fan Qunxiao (yellow card) 90'	Stadium: Tseung Kwan O Sports Ground (Capacity:3,500); Attendance: 1,017

20 November 2011 Week 6	TSW Pegasus	2 - 1	South China	Yuen Long
17:30(GMT+8)	Leandro Carrijo 49'; Santos Manoel 56' (pen.); Takada (yellow card) 67'; Todd (red card) 67'; Karikari (yellow card) 87'	Summary	Joel (yellow card) 17'; Li Hai Qiang 21' (yellow card) 36'; Wellingsson (yellow card) 67'; Chan Siu Ki (yellow card) 67'	Stadium: Yuen Long Stadium (Capacity:4,932)

4 December 2011 Week 7	Citizen	2 - 3	TSW Pegasus	Mong Kok
17:30(GMT+8)	Detinho 7' (yellow card) 40'; Gonçalves 27'	Summary	Leandro Carrijo (yellow card) 8'; Lau Nim Yat (yellow card) 16'; Santos Manoel 24' (pen.) 69'; Karikari 81'	Stadium: Mong Kok Stadium (Capacity:6,680)

17 December 2011 Week 8	TSW Pegasus	3 - 1	Tuen Mun	Yuen Long
17:30(GMT+8)	Lee Hong Lim 30'; Deng Jinghuang (yellow card) 35'; Lau Ka Shing 48'; Santos Manoel 66'; Yuen Tsun Nam (yellow card) 84'	Summary	Chan Hin Kwong (yellow card) 24'; Leung Kwok Wai (yellow card) 61'; Ip Kwok Hei (yellow card) 66'; Trnavac 72'	Stadium: Yuen Long Stadium (Capacity:4,932); Attendance: 1,192

7 January 2012 Week 9	Sunray Cave JC Sun Hei	1 - 3	TSW Pegasus	Mong Kok
17:30(GMT+8)	Ambassa Guy Gerard 2'; Li Hang Wui (yellow card) 63'; Kilama Jean Jacques (red card) 64'; Milovanovic (yellow card) 76' (yellow-red card) 79'	Summary	Mbome (yellow card) 30'; Karikari 47'; Cheung Kin Fung 66' (pen.); Leandro Carrijo 82'	Stadium: Mong Kok Stadium (Capacity:6,680); Attendance: 1,751

4 February 2012 Week 10	TSW Pegasus	3 - 0	Sham Shui Po	Yuen Long
17:30(GMT+8)	Lee Hong Lim (yellow card) 30'; Leandro Carrijo 58' 77'; Poon Yiu Cheuk (yellow card) 73'; Ng Wai Chiu 86'	Summary	Leung Kwun Chung (yellow card) 70'	Stadium: Yuen Long Stadium (Capacity:4,932); Attendance: 955

12 February 2012 Week 11	TSW Pegasus	2 - 1	Kitchee	Yuen Long
17:30(GMT+8)	Lau Nim Yat (yellow card) 26'; Mbome 52' (yellow card) 71'; Leandro Carrijo (yellow card) 58'; Dodd (yellow card) 74'; Santos Manoel (yellow card) 76'; Poon Yiu Cheuk (yellow card) 83'; Wang Zhenpeng 90' (o.g.)	Summary	Daniel Cancela (yellow card) 33'; Yago 36'; Jorge Tarres (yellow card) 40'; Fernando Recio (yellow card) 60'; Chu Siu Kei (yellow card) 78'; Losada (yellow card) 78'	Stadium: Yuen Long Stadium (Capacity:4,932); Attendance: 2,376

2 March 2012 Week 12	Hong Kong Sapling	2 - 2	TSW Pegasus	Kowloon
18:00(GMT+8)	Andreu Ramos 46' (yellow card) 83'; Choi Kwok Wai (yellow card) 64'; Chiu Yu Ming (yellow card) 65'; Akande 71' (yellow card) 90'	Summary	Karikari 28'; Mbome (yellow card) 90'; Dodd (yellow card) 90'; Leandro Carrijo 90+2'	Stadium: Kowloon Bay Park; Attendance: 187

17 March 2012 Week 13	TSW Pegasus	6 - 4	Citizen	Yuen Long
17:30(GMT+8)	Santos Manoel 7' 54'; Lee Hong Lim 34'; Leandro Carrijo 38' 53'; Ng Wai Chiu (yellow card) 61'; Cheung Kin Fung 68'; Takada (yellow card) 88'	Summary	Yang Yuan 61'; Ma Ki Ka (yellow card) 65'; Tam Lok Hin 85'; Campion Michael Xavier 87' (pen.) 90' (pen.)	Stadium: Yuen Long Stadium; Attendance: 881

1 April 2012 Week 14	Tuen Mun	1 - 1	TSW Pegasus	Tuen Mun
17:30(GMT+8)	Lin Zhong (yellow card) 13'; Bhengu (yellow card) 23'; Leung Kwok Wai (yellow card) 27'; Chow Cheuk Fung 80'; Teodorovic (yellow card) 88'	Summary	Lau Nim Yat 36'; Leandro Carrijo 61'; Karikari (yellow card) 82'	Stadium: Tuen Mun Tang Shiu Kin Sports Ground; Attendance: 1,099

7 April 2012 Week 15	Biu Chun Rangers	0 - 3	TSW Pegasus	Hong Kong
15:30(GMT+8)	Guy Junior (yellow card) 27'; Sandro (yellow card) 28'; Ip Chong Long (yellow card) 30' (yellow-red card) 87'	Summary	Cheung Kin Fung 4'; Mckee Jaimes Anthony 31'; Chan Ming Kong (yellow card) 45'; Dodd (yellow card) 54'; Leandro Carrijo 69'	Stadium: Mong Kok Stadium

22 April 2012 Week 16	South China	4 - 0	TSW Pegasus	Kong Kong
18:30(GMT+8)	Xu Deshuai 22'; Giovane 33', 41', 46'; Li Haiqiang (yellow card) 64'; Lee Chi Ho (yellow card) 70'	Summary	Lau Nim Yat (yellow card) 30'	Stadium: Hong Kong Stadium; Attendance: 2,037

5 May 2012 Week 17	TSW Pegasus	4 - 0	Wofoo Tai Po	Yuen Long
18:30(GMT+8)	Karikari (yellow card) 31' (goal) 75'; Deng Jinghuang (yellow card) 45'; Ng Wai Chiu 61'; Leandro Carrijó 80'; Jaimes McKee 85'; Mbome (yellow card) 90'	Summary	Afonso (yellow card) 45'; Ye Jia (yellow card) 80'; William Carlos Gomes (yellow card) 88'; Sze Kin Wai (yellow card) 89'	Stadium: Yuen Long Stadium; Attendance: 715

18 May 2012 Week 18	TSW Pegasus	1 - 2	Sunray Cave JC Sun Hei	Yuen Long
21:00(GMT+8)	Deng Jinghuang (yellow card) 8'; Karikari 57'	Report	Roberto 9' (pen.) (yellow card) 85'; Jean-Jacques Kilama (yellow card) 19'; Mamadou Barry 25'; Li Hang Wui (yellow card) 59' (yellow-red card) 90'	Stadium: Yuen Long Stadium; Attendance: 613

== Directors and staffs ==
=== Directors ===
Position	Staff
President	(Hong Kong) Wilson Wong
Vice President	(Hong Kong) Man Luk Sing
Vice President	(Hong Kong) Nelson Wong
Chairman	(Hong Kong) Leung Che Cheung
Vice Chairman	(Hong Kong) Mingo Tang
Director	(Hong Kong) Hui King Wai
Legal Advisor	(Hong Kong) Vincent Tso
Treasurer	(Hong Kong) Dennis Wong
Secretary	(Hong Kong) Eunice Chan

=== Staffs ===
Position	Staff
Head Coach	(Hong Kong) Chan Hiu Ming
Assistant Coach	(Hong Kong) Yeung Ching Kwong
Assistant Coach	(Hong Kong) Luk Koon Pong
Goalkeeping Coach	(Hong Kong) Leung Cheuk Cheung
Executive Officer	(Hong Kong) Chan Yuen Ting
Project Manager	(Hong Kong) Ip Soso
Public Relation Officer	(Hong Kong) Mandy Chan
