= 2011–12 Hong Kong First Division League =

bma Hong Kong First Division League
- Season: 2011–12
- Champions: Kitchee
- Relegated: Sham Shui Po
- AFC Cup: Kitchee; Sunray Cave JC Sun Hei
- Matches: 90
- Goals: 304 (3.38 per match)
- Top goalscorer: Sandro (11 goals)
- Biggest home win: Kitchee 6–0 Hong Kong Sapling
- Biggest away win: Sham Shui Po 2–6 Tuen Mun; Biu Chun Rangers 2–6 Kitchee
- Highest scoring: TSW Pegasus 6–4 Citizen
- Longest winning run: Kitchee (4 matches)
- Longest unbeaten run: Kitchee; Sunray Cave JC Sun Hei (5 matches)
- Longest winless run: Sham Shui Po; Hong Kong Sapling (5 matches)
- Longest losing run: Sham Shui Po; Hong Kong Sapling (5 matches)
- Highest attendance: 4,499; Sunray Cave JC Sun Hei 5–0 Sham Shui Po; Mong Kok Stadium (Round 4)
- Lowest attendance: 126; Biu Chun Rangers 4–0 Hong Kong Sapling; Tsing Yi Sports Ground (Round 8)
- Average attendance: 1,157

The 2011–12 Hong Kong First Division League, also known as 2011–12 bma Hong Kong First Division League season, was the 100th since its establishment. Kitchee SC was the defending champions, having won their 4th Hong Kong title in the previous season.

== Teams ==
Locations of the Hong Kong First Division League 2011–12 venues

A total of 10 teams will contest the league, 8 of which already contested in the 2010–11 season and 2 of which will be promoted from the 2010–11 Hong Kong Second Division League.

Tai Chung was relegated to Second Division after ending a two-year tenure in First Division and HKFC was also relegated, making its immediate return to the second level after just one year in the Hong Kong top flight. The 2 relegated teams will be replaced by Sham Shui Po and Pontic from the 2010–11 Hong Kong Second Division League.

Fourway Rangers changed their name to Biu Chun Rangers.

=== Stadia ===
| Team | Stadium | Location | Capacity |
|---|---|---|---|
| Biu Chun Rangers | Tsing Yi Sports Ground | Tsing Yi | 1,500 |
| Citizen | Mong Kok Stadium | Mong Kok | 6,680 |
| Hong Kong Sapling | Kowloon Bay Park | Kowloon Bay | 1,200 |
| Kitchee | Tseung Kwan O Sports Ground | Tseung Kwan O | 3,500 |
| Sham Shui Po | Sham Shui Po Sports Ground | Sham Shui Po | 2,194 |
| South China | Hong Kong Stadium | So Kon Po | 40,000 |
| Sunray Cave JC Sun Hei | Mong Kok Stadium | Mong Kok | 6,680 |
| TSW Pegasus | Yuen Long Stadium | Yuen Long | 4,932 |
| Tuen Mun | Tuen Mun Tang Shiu Kin Sports Ground | Tuen Mun | 2,200 |
| Wofoo Tai Po | Tai Po Sports Ground | Tai Po | 3,000 |

^{1}As Mutual has withdrawn from 2011 to 2012 Hong Kong First Division League, Hong Kong Sapling is formed to replace.

=== Personnel and sponsorship ===
The 2011–12 season will continue to be sponsored by BMA Entertainment, a company owned by South China's convener Steven Lo. bma's sponsorship is worth HK$2 million. (approx US$250,000.) Of the HK$2 million, HK$1.2 million will be for the sponsorship of the Now TV Hong Kong football channel. The league winners will receive HK$500,000 prize money, while the 1st runner's up and 2nd runner's up will receive HK$200,000 and HK$100,000 respectively.

The referees' uniforms are sponsored by Lotto Sport Italia.

| Team | Chairman | Head coach | Captain | Kitmaker | Shirt sponsor |
|---|---|---|---|---|---|
| Biu Chun Rangers | Mok Yiu Keung | Tim Bredbury | Beto | Xtep | Nikko |
| Citizen | Pui Kwan Kay | Chu Kwok Kuen | Festus Baise | Jako | Rasonic |
| Hong Kong Sapling | Brian Leung | Paul Foster | Tsang Chi Hau | Nike | — |
| Kitchee | Ken Ng | Josep Gombau | Roberto Losada | Nike | Canon |
| Wofoo Tai Po | Cheung Hok Ming | Cheung Po Chun | Chan Yuk Chi | Adidas | Lee & Man Paper |
| Sham Shui Po | Chan Tung | Lee Chi Kin | Poon Yiu Cheuk | Nike | — |
| South China | Steven Lo | Ján Kocian | Li Haiqiang | Adidas | Panasonic Corporation |
| Sunray Cave JC Sun Hei | Chow Man Leung | José Ricardo Rambo | Cristiano Cordeiro | Adidas | Sunray Cave |
| TSW Pegasus | Wilson Wong | Chan Hiu Ming | Itaparica | Adidas | PS3 |
| Tuen Mun | Lau Wong Fat | Yan Lik Kin | Čedomir Mijanović | Adidas | — |

== Television broadcast ==
For the 2011–12 season, Now TV's channel 634 will become the Hong Kong Football Channel. The first live broadcast of the season will be Kitchee vs Sun Hei SC on 3 September 2011. The production cost will be sponsored by the TV station and supported by HKFA and the clubs. Advertising revenues, after subtracting Now TV's costs, will be shared with HKFA. Now TV announced that the channel will be free to all Now TV subscribers. The production cost of the channel is about HK$40 million. Now TV hopes that the Hong Kong government will subsidise the channel in the future, because they will also broadcast Hong Kong's inter-school matches.

As Sun Hei has decided not to take part in the TV broadcast package, the HKFA has imposed four broadcast sanctions: No live home game broadcasts, no division of advertising revenues, no interviews or feature programmes of team personnel and no mention of their sponsors' names. Faced with these sanctions, Sun Hei's Chung Chi Kwong continued to say the club has the right to spend its resources the way they like and will not change its mind due to external influences.

== League table ==
| Pos | Team | Pld | W | D | L | GF | GA | GD | Pts | Qualification or relegation |
|---|---|---|---|---|---|---|---|---|---|---|
| 1 | Kitchee | 18 | 13 | 3 | 2 | 44 | 20 | +24 | 42 | 2013 AFC Cup Group stage |
| 2 | TSW Pegasus | 18 | 12 | 2 | 4 | 48 | 26 | +22 | 38 | |
| 3 | South China | 18 | 10 | 6 | 2 | 47 | 17 | +30 | 36 | |
| 4 | Sunray Cave JC Sun Hei | 18 | 8 | 4 | 6 | 29 | 22 | +7 | 28 | 2013 AFC Cup Group stage (Note: via 2011–12 Hong Kong Senior Challenge Shield) |
| 5 | Citizen | 18 | 5 | 8 | 5 | 29 | 31 | −2 | 23 | |
| 6 | Tuen Mun | 18 | 5 | 8 | 5 | 26 | 22 | +4 | 23 | |
| 7 | Hong Kong Rangers | 18 | 6 | 4 | 8 | 32 | 38 | −6 | 22 | |
| 8 | Wofoo Tai Po | 18 | 6 | 2 | 10 | 24 | 40 | −16 | 20 | |
| 9 | Hong Kong Sapling (W) | 18 | 2 | 4 | 12 | 17 | 53 | −36 | 10 | Withdrew from league system |
| 10 | Sham Shui Po (R) | 18 | 1 | 3 | 14 | 9 | 36 | −27 | 6 | Relegation to Second Division |

Updated to match(es) played on 20 May 2012. Source:
Rules for classification: 1) points; 2) head-to-head points; 3) head-to-head goal difference; 4) head-to-head goals scored; 5) goal difference; 6) number of goals scored.
(R) Relegated; (W) Withdrew

=== Positions by round ===
| Team ╲ Round | 1 | 2 | 3 | 4 | 5 | 6 | 7 | 8 | 9 | 10 | 11 | 12 | 13 | 14 | 15 | 16 | 17 | 18 |
|---|---|---|---|---|---|---|---|---|---|---|---|---|---|---|---|---|---|---|
| Kitchee | 5 | 2 | 2 | 1 | 1 | 1 | 2 | 3 | 2 | 1 | 2 | 1 | 1 | 1 | 2 | 1 | 1 | 1 |
| TSW Pegasus | 1 | 1 | 1 | 3 | 6 | 3 | 3 | 1 | 1 | 2 | 1 | 2 | 2 | 2 | 1 | 2 | 2 | 2 |
| South China | 7 | 6 | 5 | 5 | 3 | 5 | 4 | 4 | 3 | 3 | 3 | 3 | 3 | 3 | 3 | 3 | 3 | 3 |
| Sunray Cave JC Sun Hei | 6 | 3 | 4 | 4 | 2 | 2 | 1 | 2 | 4 | 5 | 6 | 6 | 6 | 6 | 7 | 6 | 4 | 4 |
| Citizen | 4 | 3 | 3 | 2 | 4 | 4 | 5 | 5 | 5 | 4 | 4 | 4 | 4 | 5 | 4 | 4 | 5 | 5 |
| Tuen Mun | 3 | 7 | 7 | 8 | 7 | 7 | 7 | 8 | 8 | 8 | 8 | 7 | 7 | 8 | 8 | 7 | 7 | 6 |
| Hong Kong Rangers | 9 | 8 | 6 | 7 | 8 | 8 | 8 | 7 | 7 | 6 | 5 | 5 | 5 | 4 | 5 | 5 | 6 | 7 |
| Wofoo Tai Po | 2 | 5 | 8 | 6 | 5 | 6 | 6 | 6 | 6 | 7 | 7 | 8 | 8 | 7 | 6 | 8 | 8 | 8 |
| Hong Kong Sapling | 10 | 10 | 10 | 10 | 10 | 9 | 9 | 9 | 9 | 9 | 10 | 10 | 9 | 9 | 9 | 10 | 9 | 9 |
| Sham Shui Po | 8 | 9 | 9 | 9 | 9 | 10 | 10 | 10 | 10 | 10 | 9 | 9 | 10 | 10 | 10 | 9 | 10 | 10 |

| 2012 AFC Cup group stage |
| Relegation to 2012–13 Hong Kong Second Division League |

Updated to match(es) played on 21 April 2012. Source: hkfa.com

== Fixtures and results ==
=== Round 1 ===
| 3 September 2011 | Kitchee | 1–1 | Sunray Cave JC Sun Hei | Tseung Kwan O |
| 17:00(GMT+8) | Roberto 47' (pen.) | Report | 20' Leung Tsz Chun; (yellow card) 47' Kilama; (yellow card) 84' Sealy; (yellow card) 85' Cheng Siu Wai; (yellow card) 90' Li Ming; (yellow card) 90' Cordeiro | Stadium: Tseung Kwan O Sports Ground (Capatity:3,500); Attendance: 1,697; Referee: Liu Man Fai; Assistant referees: Chan Shui Hung; Chung Ming Sang; Fourth official: Ho Wai Sing |

| 9 September 2011 | TSW Pegasus | 4–1 | Biu Chun Rangers | Yuen Long |
| 20:00(GMT+8) | Itaparica 49' (pen.), 60'; Cheung Kin Fung (yellow card) 74'; Godfred 63', 90' | Report | 6' Yan Minghao; (yellow card) 69' Liu Songwei; (yellow card) 81' Tong Kin Man; (yellow card) 84' Chan Siu Yuen; (yellow card) 90' Sandro | Stadium: Yuen Long Stadium (Capacity:4,932); Attendance: 1,215; Referee: Ng Chiu Kok; Assistant referees: Pau Sai Yin; Chan Shui Hung; Fourth official: Yu Chun San |

| 10 September 2011 | Sham Shui Po | 0–1 | Citizen | Sham Shui Po |
| 14:30(GMT+8) | | Report | 23' Paulinho | Stadium: Sham Shui Po Sports Ground (Capacity:2,194); Attendance: 1,855; Referee: Tong Kui Sum; Assistant referees: Lam Chi Ho; Lui Siu Chuen; Fourth official: Ng Chin Pang |

| 10 September 2011 | South China | 1–2 | Tuen Mun | So Kon Po |
| 17:30(GMT+8) | Li Haiqiang (yellow card) 65'; Souza 75' | Report | 12' Trnavac; (yellow card) 28' Chan Hin Kwong; 38' Makhosonke Bhengu; (yellow card) 78' Vujosevic; (yellow card) 78' Mirko | Stadium: Hong Kong Stadium (Capacity:40,000); Attendance: 3,126; Referee: Ng Kai Lam; Assistant referees: Cheng Oi Cho; Poon Ming Fai; Fourth official: Yau Ho Fai, Leo |

| 11 September 2011 | Wofoo Tai Po | 3–0 | Hong Kong Sapling | Tai Po |
| 14:30(GMT+8) | Kwok Wing Sun 16'; Lui Chi Hang (yellow card) 45'; Lima 52' (yellow card) 55'; Annan 64' | Report | (yellow card) 44' Mbome | Stadium: Tai Po Sports Ground (Capacity:3,000); Attendance: 784; Referee: Wong Chi Tang, Charlton; Assistant referees: Chow Chun Kit; Ho Wai Sing; Fourth official: Lam Shing Yan, Franky |

=== Round 2 ===
| 16 September 2011 | Biu Chun Rangers | 2–2 | Citizen | Tsing Yi |
| 20:00(GMT+8) | Beto 21'; Sandro (yellow card) 35' (goal) 83' | Report | 43' Festus; 49' Nakamura | Stadium: Tsing Yi Sports Ground (Capacity:1,500); Attendance: 266; Referee: Liu Kwok Man; Assistant referees: Lam Chi Ho; Ng Chin Pang; Fourth official: Cheung Kwok Hung |

| 17 September 2011 | Tuen Mun | 1–2 | Sunray Cave JC Sun Hei | Tuen Mun |
| 14:30(GMT+8) | Leung Kwok Wai (yellow card) 35'; Niko 88' | Report | 15' Cheng Siu Wai; (yellow card) 48' Li Hang Wui; 57' Barry | Stadium: Tuen Mun Tang Shiu Kin Sports Ground (Capacity:2,200); Attendance: 1,260; Referee: Tong Kui Sum; Assistant referees: Chan Shui Hung; Poon Ming Fai; Fourth official: Ng Chin Pang |

| 17 September 2011 | TSW Pegasus | 4–0 | Hong Kong Sapling | Yuen Long |
| 17:30(GMT+8) | Itaparica 47'; Lai Yiu Cheong 53'; McKee 60'; Fan Qunxiao (yellow card) 67'; Godfred Karikari 90' | | (yellow card) 32' Wong Yim Kwan; (yellow card) 88' Nam Wing Hang | Stadium: Yuen Long Stadium (Capacity:4,932); Attendance: 923; Referee: Cheng Oi Cho; Assistant referees: Pau Sai Yin; Lam Nai Kei; Fourth official: Yu Chun San |

| 18 September 2011 | Sham Shui Po | 0–2 | South China | Sham Shui Po |
| 14:30(GMT+8) | | Report | 6' Wellingsson de Souza; (yellow card) 9' Ng Wai Chiu; 13' Dyron Daal | Stadium: Sham Shui Po Sports Ground (Capacity:2,194); Attendance: 2,185; Referee: Ng Kai Lam; Assistant referees: Wong Chi Tang, Charlton; Chung Ming Sang; Fourth official: Lam Shing Yan, Franky |

| 18 September 2011 | Kitchee | 4–2 | Wofoo Tai Po | Tseung Kwan O |
| 17:30(GMT+8) | Chu Siu Kei (yellow card) 37'; Roberto 61', 65'; Recio (yellow card) 72'; Luzardo 75'; Huang Yang 82' (yellow card) 89'; Jordi (yellow card) 88' | | (yellow card) 45' Ye Jia; (yellow card) 50' Kwok Wing Sun; 59', 70' Christian Annan; (yellow card) 72' Lima; (yellow card) 79' Sze Kin Wai; (yellow card) 86' Chan Yuk Chi | Stadium: Tseung Kwan O Sports Ground (Capacity:3,500); Attendance: 1,113; Referee: Ng Chiu Kok; Assistant referees: Chow Chun Kit; Lui Siu Chuen; Fourth official: Lam Chi Ho |

=== Round 3 ===
| 23 September 2011 | South China | 0–0 | Sunray Cave JC Sun Hei | So Kon Po |
| 20:00(GMT+8) | Lee Chi Ho (yellow card) 68'; Giovane (yellow card) 76'; Bai He (yellow card) 82' | Report | (yellow card) 39' Cheng Siu Wai | Stadium: Hong Kong Stadium (Capacity:40,000); Attendance: 2,776; Referee: Ng Chiu Kok; Assistant referees: Chan Shui Hung; Lam Nai Kei; Fourth official: Tong Kui Sum |

| 24 September 2011 | Sham Shui Po | 0–4 | TSW Pegasus | Sham Shui Po |
| 14:30(GMT+8) | Fong Pak Lun (yellow card) 72' | Report | Godfred 26', 75', 89' (yellow card) 79'; Lee Wai Lun (yellow card) 46'; Itaparica 59' | Stadium: Sham Shui Po Sports Ground (Capacity:2,194); Attendance: 1,684; Referee: Liu Kwok Man; Assistant referees: Cheng Oi Cho; Lui Siu Chuen; Fourth official: Pau Sai Yin |

| 24 September 2011 | Biu Chun Rangers | 4–1 | Wofoo Tai Po | Tsing Yi |
| 17:30(GMT+8) | Fan Weijun (yellow card) 35'; Sandro 37'; Chak Ting Fung 44'; Chao Pengfei 45'; Ondoua 81' (yellow card) 82' | Report | 70' (pen.) Ye Jia | Stadium: Tsing Yi Sports Ground (Capacity:1,500); Attendance: 380; Referee: Ng Kai Lam; Assistant referees: Lam Chi Ho; Poon Ming Fai; Fourth official: Sarao, Amarjit Singh |

| 25 September 2011 | Tuen Mun | 1–2 | Citizen | Tuen Mun |
| 14:30(GMT+8) | Wong Chi Chung (yellow card) 11'; Trnavac 56'; Leung Kwok Wai (yellow card) 75'; Yip Tze Chun (yellow card) 80'; Mijanović (yellow card) 83' (yellow-red card) 90'; Bhengu (yellow card) 84'; Nikola (yellow card) 90' | Report | 12' (yellow card) 90' Paulinho; (yellow card) 67' Chan Man Chun; 78' Festus; (yellow card) 90' Fung Kai Hong | Stadium: Tuen Mun Tang Shiu Kin Sports Ground (Capacity:2,200); Attendance: 948; Referee: Wong Chi Tang, Charlton; Assistant referees: Ng Chiu Kok; Chung Ming Sang; Fourth official: Yu Chun San |

| 25 September 2011 | Kitchee | 6–0 | Hong Kong Sapling | Tseung Kwan O |
| 17:30(GMT+8) | Lo Kwan Yee (yellow card) 44'; Recio (yellow card) 61'; Roberto Losada 67'; Jordi 73'; Lo Chi Kwan 75', 85', 90'; Chan Man Fai 87' | Report | (yellow card) 8' Chan Cham Hei; (yellow card) 86' (yellow-red card) 88' Li Shu Yeung | Stadium: Tseung Kwan O Sports Ground (Capacity:3,500); Attendance: 481; Referee: Pau Sai Yin; Assistant referees: Tong Kui Sum; Ho Wai Sing; Fourth official: Lui Siu Chuen |

=== Round 4 ===
| 14 October 2011 | Hong Kong Sapling | 1–3 | Citizen | Kowloon Bay |
| 20:00(GMT+8) | Tsang Chi Hau (yellow card) 30'; Ramos 33' (pen.); Chan Cham Hei (yellow card) 48'; Choi Kwok Wai (yellow card) 49' | Report | (yellow card) 35' Cheung Kwok Ming; 52' Tam Lok Hin; (yellow card) 57' Wong Yiu Fu; 59' Paulinho; 63' (pen.) Festus; (yellow card) 66' (yellow-red card) 90' Sham Kwok Fai | Stadium: Kowloon Bay Park (Capacity:1,200); Attendance: 229; Referee: Ng Kai Lam; Assistant referees: Lam Chi Ho; Lam Nai Kei; Fourth official: Sarao, Amarjit Singh |

| 15 October 2011 | Tuen Mun | 0–1 | Kitchee | Tuen Mun |
| 14:30(GMT+8) | Chan Hin Kwong (yellow card) 18' (yellow-red card) 66'; Bhengu (yellow card) 45'; Law Ka Lok (yellow card) 86' | Report | (yellow card) 31' Dani; (yellow card) 64' Recio; 84' Roberto | Stadium: Tuen Mun Tang Shiu Kin Sports Ground (Capacity:2,200); Attendance: 1,042; Referee: Liu Kwok Man; Assistant referees: Pau Sai Yin; Poon Ming Fai; Fourth official: Ng Chin Pang |

| 15 October 2011 | South China | 3–0 | Biu Chun Rangers | So Kon Po |
| 17:30(GMT+8) | Joel (yellow card) 23'; Li Haiqiang (yellow card) 24'; Lee Wai Lim 50'; Ng Wai Chiu 81'; Giovane 86'; Man Pei Tak (yellow card) 89' | Report | (yellow card) 55' Ondoua; (yellow card) 79' Lam Hok Hei | Stadium: Hong Kong Stadium (Capacity:40,000); Attendance: 1,496; Referee: Wong Chi Tang, Charlton; Assistant referees: Chow Chun Kit; Lui Siu Chuen; Fourth official: Cheng Oi Cho |

| 16 October 2011 | Wofoo Tai Po | 3–1 | TSW Pegasus | Tai Po |
| 14:30(GMT+8) | Carlos 5'; Annan 40'; Lui Chi Hing 45' | Report | Li Ka Chun (yellow card) 22'; Carrijó 80' (yellow card) 76' (yellow-red card) 90' | Stadium: Tai Po Sports Ground (Capacity:3,000); Attendance: 948; Referee: Tong Kui Sum; Assistant referees: Ng Chiu Kok; Chung Ming Sang; Fourth official: Lam Shing Yan, Franky |

| 16 October 2011 | Sunray Cave JC Sun Hei | 5–0 | Sham Shui Po | Mong Kok |
| 17:30(GMT+8) | Cheng Siu Wai 18'; Mamadou Barry 44', 59', 66' (yellow card) 72'; Pak Wing Chak 57' | | | Stadium: Mong Kok Stadium (Capacity:6,680); Attendance: 4,499; Referee: Cheng Oi Cho; Assistant referees: Chan Shui Hung; Ho Wai Sing; Fourth official: Lam Chi Ho |

=== Round 5 ===
| 21 October 2011 | Citizen | 1–2 | Wofoo Tai Po | Mong Kok |
| 20:00(GMT+8) | Paulinho 64' (yellow card) 17' | Report | 21', 74' (yellow card) 42' Christian Annan; (yellow card) 63' Clayton | Stadium: Mong Kok Stadium (Capacity:6,680); Attendance: 2,172; Referee: Ng Kai Lam; Assistant referees: Wong Chi Tang, Charlton; Chung Ming Sang; Fourth official: Yu Chun San |

| 22 October 2011 | Hong Kong Sapling | 0–5 | South China | Mong Kok |
| 14:30(GMT+8) | Andreu Ramos Isus (yellow card) 31'; Eugene Mbome (yellow card) 63' | Report | 5' Giovane; 36' Ng Wai Chiu; 42', 58' (yellow card) 31' Wellingsson de Souza; 51' Kwok Kin Pong; (yellow card) 71' Xu Deshuai | Stadium: Mong Kok Stadium (Capacity:6,680); Attendance: 3,994; Referee: Pau Sai Yin; Assistant referees: Lam Chi Ho; Lui Siu Chuen; Fourth official: Cheung Kwok Hung |

| 22 October 2011 | Sunray Cave JC Sun Hei | 1–0 | Biu Chun Rangers | Mong Kok |
| 17:00(GMT+8) | Gerard Ambassa Guy (yellow card) 20'; Kilama (red card) 23'; Cheng Siu Wai 89' | Report | (yellow card) 21' Chao Pengfei; (yellow card) 81' Liu Songwei | Stadium: Mong Kok Stadium (Capacity:6,680); Attendance: 3,994; Referee: Wong Chi Tang; Assistant referees: Lam Shing Yan, Franky; Poon Ming Fai; Fourth official: Cheng Oi Cho |

| 23 October 2011 | Sham Shui Po | 2–6 | Tuen Mun | Sham Shui Po |
| 14:30(GMT+8) | Lau Cheuk Hin (yellow card) 33' (goal) 61'; Chan Siu Kwan (yellow card) 52'; Leung Kwun Chung 80' (pen.); Law Man Chung 82' | Report | 23', 62' Bhengu; 42', 56', 90' Lin Zhong; (yellow card) 57' Wong Chi Chung; (yellow card) 79' Leung Kwok Wai; 81' Mijanović | Stadium: Sham Shui Po Sports Ground (Capacity:2,194); Attendance: 810; Referee: Liu Kwok Man; Assistant referees: Lam Nai Kei; Ng Chin Pang; Fourth official: Pau Sai Yin |

| 23 October 2011 | Kitchee | 3–2 | TSW Pegasus | Tseung Kwan O |
| 17:30(GMT+8) | Luzardo 22', 83' (yellow card) 26'; Dani (yellow card) 67'; Tsang Kam To 86' | Report | (yellow card) 13' Lau Nim Yat; 29' Itaparica; (yellow card) 42' Godfred; (yellow card) 64' Dodd; 69' McKee; (yellow card) 72' Chan Ming Kong; (yellow card) 90' Fan Qunxiao | Stadium: Tseung Kwan O Sports Ground (Capacity:3,500); Attendance: 1,017; Referee: Cheng Oi Cho; Assistant referees: Lam Chi Ho; Ho Wai Sing; Fourth official: Yu Chun San |

Note: The match between Hong Kong Sapling and South China was played at Mong Kok Stadium.(Originally at Kowloon Bay Park)

=== Round 6 ===
| 18 November 2011 | Hong Kong Sapling | 1–1 | Tuen Mun | Kowloon Bay |
| 20:00(GMT+8) | Ramos 19'; Li Ngai Hoi (yellow card) 73' | | (yellow card) 14' Chan Hin Kwong; (yellow card) 25' Chow Cheuk Fung; 79' Yan Pak Long | Stadium: Kowloon Bay Park (Capacity:1,200); Attendance: 218; Referee: Tong Kui Sum; Assistant referees: Wong Chi Tang, Charlton; Lam Nai Kei; Fourth official: Cheung Kwok Hung |

| 19 November 2011 | Wofoo Tai Po | 0–1 | Sunray Cave JC Sun Hei | Tai Po |
| 14:30(GMT+8) | Kwok Wing Sun (yellow card) 17'; Li Chun Yip (yellow card) 47'; Clayton (yellow card) 84'; Christian Annan (yellow card) 85'; Júnior (yellow card) 89' | Report | (yellow card) 2' Gerard Ambassa Guy; (red card) 90' Pan Jia; 85' (pen.) Barry; (yellow card) 89' Michael Luk | Stadium: Tai Po Sports Ground (Capacity:3,000); Attendance: 867; Referee: Liu Kwok Man; Assistant referees: Chan Shui Hung; Poon Ming Fai; Fourth official: Poon Chung Kit |

| 19 November 2011 | Biu Chun Rangers | 2–0 | Sham Shui Po | Tsing Yi |
| 17:30(GMT+8) | Alex 12'; Liu Songwei (yellow card) 56'; Tong Kin Man (yellow card) 65'; Lam Hok Hei 75'; Ondoua (yellow card) 90' | Report | (yellow card) 18' Poon Yiu Cheuk; (yellow card) 52' Chan Siu Kwan; (yellow card) 56' Fernando; (yellow card) 79' Lau Cheuk Hin; (yellow card) 80' Lam Ngai Tong | Stadium: Tsing Yi Sports Ground (Capacity:1,500); Attendance: 318; Referee: Pau Sai Yin; Assistant referees: Ng Chin Pang; Lui Siu Chuen; Fourth official: Ng Chiu Kok |

| 20 November 2011 | Citizen | 0–0 | Kitchee | Mong Kok |
| 14:30(GMT+8) | Festus (yellow card) 5'; Wong Yiu Fu (yellow card) 66'; Chan Man Chun (yellow card) 82' | Report | (yellow card) 45' Huang Yang; (yellow card) 82' Michael | Stadium: Mong Kok Stadium (Capacity:6,680); Attendance: 1,722; Referee: Tong Kui Sum; Assistant referees: Lam Shing Yan, Franky; Ho Wai Sing; Fourth official: Chan Shui Hung |

| 20 November 2011 | TSW Pegasus | 2–1 | South China | Yuen Long |
| 17:30(GMT+8) | Carrijo 47'; Itaparica (pen.), 56'; Takada (yellow card) 67'; Dodd (red card); Godfred (yellow card) 87' | Report | (yellow card) 17' Joel; 21' (yellow card) 36' Li Haiqiang; (yellow card) 67' Chan Siu Ki; (yellow card) 67' Souza | Stadium: Yuen Long Stadium (Capacity:4,932); Attendance: 2,397; Referee: Ng Chiu Kok; Assistant referees: Pau Sai Yin; Chung Ming Sang; Fourth official: Lui Siu Chuen |

=== Round 7 ===
| 2 December 2011 | Sunray Cave JC Sun Hei | 5–0 | Hong Kong Sapling | Mong Kok |
| 20:00(GMT+8) | Cheng Siu Wai 1', 49'; Wong Chun Yue (yellow card) 25'; Barry (yellow card) 36'; Michael Luk (yellow card) 43' (goal) 64'; Cahê 68'; Leung Tsz Chun 73'; Wong Chun Ho (yellow card) 75' | Report | (yellow card) 74' Tsang Chi Hau | Stadium: Mong Kok Stadium (Capacity:6,680); Attendance: 468; Referee: Ng Kai Lam; Assistant referees: Ng Chiu Kok; Lam Shing Yan, Franky; Fourth official: Tang Hing Fu |

| 3 December 2011 | Tuen Mun | 1–1 | Biu Chun Rangers | Tuen Mun |
| 14:30(GMT+8) | Bhengu 54' | Report | 38' Sandro; (yellow card) 77' Liu Songwei | Stadium: Tuen Mun Tang Shiu Kin Sports Ground (Capacity:2,200); Attendance: 714; Referee: Tong Kui Sum; Assistant referees: Chan Shui Hung; Lui Siu Chuen; Fourth official: Lam Shing Yan, Franky |

| 3 December 2011 | South China | 3–0 | Wofoo Tai Po | So Kon Po |
| 17:30(GMT+8) | Lee Chi Ho (yellow card) 68'; Giovane (yellow card) 76'; Bai He (yellow card) 82' | Report | Cheng Siu Wai (yellow card) 39' | Stadium: Hong Kong Stadium (Capacity:40,000); Attendance: 2,776; Referee: Ng Chiu Kok; Assistant referees: Chan Shui Hung; Lam Nai Kei; Fourth official: Tong Kui Sum |

| 4 December 2011 | Sham Shui Po | 0–1 | Kitchee | Sham Shui Po |
| 14:30(GMT+8) | Aender Naves Mesquita (yellow card) 22'; Poon Yiu Cheuk (yellow card) 50'; Leung Kwun Chung (yellow card) 59'; Lau Cheuk Hin (yellow card) 66' | Report | (yellow card) 58' Ubay Luzardo; 74' Lo Chi Kwan; (yellow card) 85' Liu Quankun | Stadium: Sham Shui Po Sports Ground (Capacity:2,194); Attendance: 992 |

| 4 December 2011 | Citizen | 2–3 | TSW Pegasus | Mong Kok |
| 17:30(GMT+8) | Detinho 7' (yellow card) 40'; Hélio 27'; Festus (yellow card) 90' | Report | (yellow card) 8' Carrijó; (yellow card) 16' Lau Nim Yat; 24' (pen.), 69' Itaparica; 81' Godfred; (yellow card) 90' Cheung Kin Fung | Stadium: Mong Kok Stadium (Capacity:6,680); Attendance: 1,156; Referee: Wong Chi Tang, Charlton; Assistant referees: Liu Kwok Man; Chan Shui Hung; Fourth official: Pau Sai Yin |

=== Round 8 ===
| 16 December 2011 | Sunray Cave JC Sun Hei | 2–3 | Citizen | Mong Kok |
| 20:00(GMT+8) | Roberto (yellow card) 57'; Festus Baise 80' (o.g.); Cahê 85' | Report | 38', 50', 74' Nakamura; (yellow card) 46' Campion; (yellow card) 90' So Loi Keung | Stadium: Mong Kok Stadium (Capacity:6,680); Attendance: 957; Referee: Tong Kui Sum; Assistant referees: Ng Chiu Kok; Lam Shing Yan, Franky; Fourth official: Sarao, Amarjit Singh |

| 17 December 2011 | Wofoo Tai Po | 2–1 | Sham Shui Po | Tai Po |
| 14:30(GMT+8) | Chan Yuk Chi 4'; Che Runqiu (yellow card) 13'; Clayton (yellow card) 55'; Chen Liming 85'; Júnior (yellow card) 90' | Report | 18' Lau Cheuk Hin; (yellow card) 55' Chan Siu Kwan | Stadium: Tai Po Sports Ground (Capacity:3,000); Attendance: 772; Referee: Cheng Oi Cho; Assistant referees: Chow Chun Kit; Chung Ming Sang; Fourth official: Chan Ming Siu |

| 17 December 2011 | TSW Pegasus | 3–1 | Tuen Mun | Yuen Long |
| 17:30(GMT+8) | Lee Hong Lim 29'; Deng Jinghuang (yellow card) 35'; Lau Ka Shing 48'; Itaparica 66'; Yuen Tsun Nam (yellow card) 84' | Report | (yellow card) 24' Chan Hin Kwong; (yellow card) 61' Leung Kwok Wai; (yellow card) 66' Ip Kwok Hei | Stadium: Yuen Long Stadium (Capacity:4,932); Attendance: 1,192; Referee: Ng Kai Lam; Assistant referees: Ho Wai Sing; Lui Siu Chuen; Fourth official: Pau Sai Yin |

| 18 December 2011 | Biu Chun Rangers | 4–0 | Hong Kong Sapling | Tsing Yi |
| 14:30(GMT+8) | Sandro 9', 79', 89'; Fan Weijun (yellow card) 45'; Alex 64' | Report | (yellow card) 14' Ramos; (yellow card) 25' Luk Pak Hei | Stadium: Tsing Yi Sports Ground (Capacity:1,500); Attendance: 126; Referee: Pau Sai Yin; Assistant referees: Lam Nai Kei; Ng Chin Pang; Fourth official: Tong Kui Sum |

| 18 December 2011 | South China | 2–0 | Kitchee | So Kon Po |
| 17:30(GMT+8) | Joel 43', 63' (pen.); Bai He (yellow card) 44' | Report | (yellow card) 62' Dani; (yellow card) 72' Liu Quankun | Stadium: Hong Kong Stadium (Capacity:40,000); Attendance: 3,979; Referee: Liu Kwok Man; Assistant referees: Chan Shui Hung; Poon Ming Fai; Fourth official: Chow Chun Kit |

=== Round 9 ===
| 6 January 2012 | Citizen | 3–3 | South China | Mong Kok |
| 20:00(GMT+8) | Paulinho 3' (yellow card) 71'; Tam Lok Hin (yellow card) 13'; Nakamura 41'; So Loi Keung (yellow card) 78'; Sham Kwok Keung 85' (yellow card) 90+4' (yellow-red card) 90+4'; Campion (yellow card) 89' | Report | (yellow card) 18' (yellow-red card) 32' Yeo Jeehoon; (yellow card) 45' Ng Wai Chiu; 58' Au Yeung Yiu Chung; 66' Chan Siu Ki; (yellow card) 76' Lee Chi Ho; 90+3' (o.g.) Festus | Stadium: Mong Kok Stadium (Capacity:6,680); Attendance: 2,351; Referee: Wong Chi Tang, Charlton; Assistant referees: Chan Shui Hung; Lui Siu Chuen; Fourth official: Ho Wai Sing |

| 7 January 2012 | Wofoo Tai Po | 1–1 | Tuen Mun | Tai Po |
| 14:30(GMT+8) | Chen Liming 76' | Report | (yellow card) 31' Mirko; 60' Akosah | Stadium: Tai Po Sports Ground (Capacity:3,000); Attendance: 721; Referee: Tong Kui Sum; Assistant referees: Chow Chun Kit; Lam Shing Yan, Franky; Fourth official: SARAO, Amarjit Singh |

| 7 January 2012 | Sunray Cave JC Sun Hei | 1–3 | TSW Pegasus | Mong Kok |
| 17:30(GMT+8) | Gerard Ambassa Guy 2'; Li Hang Wui (yellow card) 63'; Kilama (red card); Milovanovic (yellow card) 76' (yellow-red card) 79' | Report | (yellow card) 30' Mbome; 47' Godfred; 63' (pen.) Cheung Kin Fung; 82' Carrijó | Stadium: Mong Kok Stadium (Capacity:6,680); Attendance: 1,751 |

| 8 January 2012 | Biu Chun Rangers | 2–6 | Kitchee | Mong Kok |
| 14:30(GMT+8) | Ondoua 40'; Ip Chung Long (yellow card) 76'; Sandro 90+3' (pen.) | Report | 9' (yellow card) 43' Roberto Losada; 29', 47' (yellow card) 36' Jordi; 65', 72' Liang Zicheng; 77' Lo Kwan Yee | Stadium: Mong Kok Stadium (Capacity:6,680); Attendance: 912; Referee: Ng Kai Lam; Assistant referees: Chow Chun Kit; Ho Wai Sing; Fourth official: Ng Chin Pang |

| 8 January 2012 | Hong Kong Sapling | 2–2 | Sham Shui Po | Kowloon Bay |
| 17:30(GMT+8) | Alex 4'; Tsang Chi Hau (yellow card) 58'; Ramos 71'; Su Yang (yellow card) 86' | Report | 14', 38' (pen.) Wong Wai; (yellow card) 40' Aender; (yellow card) 44' (yellow-red card) 70' Chan Siu Kwan; (yellow card) 49' Poon Yiu Cheuk | Stadium: Kowloon Bay Park (Capacity:1,200); Attendance: 335; Referee: Ng Chiu Kok; Assistant referees: Lam Chi Ho; Yu Chun San; Fourth official: Tang Hing Fu |

Note: The match between Biu Chun Rangers and Kitchee was played at Mong Kok Stadium. (Originally at Tsing Yi Sports Ground)

=== Round 10 ===
| 3 February 2012 | Hong Kong Sapling | 2–3 | Kitchee | Kowloon Bay |
| 20:00(GMT+8) | Ramos 34' (yellow card) 57'; Yan Pak Long 81' (yellow card) 85' | Report | 32' Diaz; 54', 82' Yago; (yellow card) 67' Liang Zicheng; (yellow card) 84' Recio; (red card) 90+1' Liu Quankun | Stadium: Kowloon Bay Park (Capacity:1,200); Attendance: 334; Referee: Liu Kwok Man; Assistant referees: Chan Shui Hung; Chung Ming Sang; Fourth official: Tang Hing Fu |

| 4 February 2012 | Sunray Cave JC Sun Hei | 2–4 | South China | Mong Kok |
| 14:30(GMT+8) | Michael Luk 47'; Li Hang Wui (yellow card) 66'; Cheng Siu Wai (yellow card) 82'; Barry 90'; Roberto (yellow card) 90+2' | Report | 7' Dhiego; 18' Chan Siu Ki; 64' (pen.) Joel; (yellow card) 82' Leung Chun Pong; 85' Au Yeung Yiu Chung | Stadium: Mong Kok Stadium (Capacity:6,680); Attendance: 3,676; Referee: Tong Kui Sum; Assistant referees: Ng Kai Lam; Ho Wai Sing; Fourth official: Lam Nai Kei |

| 4 February 2012 | TSW Pegasus | 3–0 | Sham Shui Po | Yuen Long |
| 17:30(GMT+8) | Lee Wai Lim (yellow card) 30'; Carrijo 58', 77'; Poon Yiu Cheuk (yellow card) 73'; Ng Wai Chiu 86' | Report | (yellow card) 70' Leung Kwun Chung | Stadium: Yuen Long Stadium (Capacity:4,932); Attendance: 955; Referee: Wong Chi Tang, Charlton; Assistant referees: Cheng Oi Cho; Poon Ming Fai; Fourth official: Yu Chun San |

| 5 February 2012 | Wofoo Tai Po | 1–4 | Biu Chun Rangers | Tai Po |
| 14:30(GMT+8) | To Hon To 53'; Chan Yuk Chi (yellow card) 81'; Clayton Michel Afonso (yellow card) 81'; Sze Kin Wai (yellow card) 89' | Report | (yellow card) 44' Li Jian; 48', 89' (pen.) Sandro; 74' Fan Weijun; 90+1' Lam Hok Hei | Stadium: Tai Po Sports Ground (Capacity:3,000); Attendance: 580; Referee: Pau Sai Yin; Assistant referees: Chow Chun Kit; Lui Siu Chuen; Fourth official: Ho Wai Sing |

| 5 February 2012 | Citizen | 1–1 | Tuen Mun | Mong Kok |
| 17:30(GMT+8) | Wong Yiu Fu 22'; So Loi Keung (yellow card) 81'; Sham Kwok Keung (yellow card) 87' | | (yellow card) 54' Mijanović; (yellow card) 57' Bamnjo; 90' (yellow card) 90' Li Ming | Stadium: Mong Kok Stadium (Capacity:6,680); Attendance: 796; Referee: Ng Chiu Kok; Assistant referees: Lam Chi Ho; Lam Nai Kei; Fourth official: Yu Chun San |

=== Round 11 ===
| 10 February 2012 | South China | 4–0 | Hong Kong Sapling | So Kon Po |
| 20:00(GMT+8) | Dhiego 28', 31'; Joel Bertoti Padilha 41' (pen.); Man Pei Tak (red card) 43'; Cheng Lai Hin 65'; Lee Chi Ho (yellow card) 67' | Report | (yellow card) 45' (yellow-red card) 47' Kot Cho Wai; (yellow card) 56' Alex; (yellow card) 68' Ramos; (yellow card) 80' Chan Cham Hei | Stadium: Hong Kong Stadium (Capacity:40,000); Attendance: 969; Referee: Wong Chi Tang, Charlton; Assistant referees: Chow Chun Kit; Yu Chun San; Fourth official: Lam Nai Kei |

| 11 February 2012 | Wofoo Tai Po | 0–0 | Citizen | Tai Po |
| 14:30(GMT+8) | Chen Liming (yellow card) 62'; Lui Chi Hing (yellow card) 75' | Report | (yellow card) 81' Festus Baise | Stadium: Tai Po Sports Ground (Capacity:3,000); Attendance: 536 |

| 11 February 2012 | Biu Chun Rangers | 2–0 | Sunray Cave JC Sun Hei | Tsing Yi |
| 17:30(GMT+8) | Sandro 26' (pen.), 86'; Chak Ting Fung (yellow card) 39'; Li Jian (yellow card) 39' | Report | (yellow card) 23' Roberto; (yellow card) 45' Pan Jia | Stadium: Tsing Yi Sports Ground (Capacity:1,500); Attendance: 288; Referee: Cheng Oi Cho; Assistant referees: Lam Chi Ho; Lui Siu Chuen; Fourth official: Chan Ming Siu |

| 12 February 2012 | Tuen Mun | 0–0 | Sham Shui Po | Tuen Mun |
| 14:30(GMT+8) | Mijanović (yellow card) 15'; Yuen Lap Cheung (yellow card) 44'; Mirko (yellow card) 77' | Report | (yellow card) 7' Leung Kwun Chung; (yellow card) 73' Lam Ngai Tong; (yellow card) 84' Evans | Stadium: Tuen Mun Tang Shiu Kin Sports Ground (Capacity:2,200); Attendance: 884; Referee: Ng Kai Lam; Assistant referees: Ho Wai Sing; Lam Shing Yan, Franky; Fourth official: Cheng Oi Cho |

| 12 February 2012 | TSW Pegasus | 2–1 | Kitchee | Yuen Long |
| 17:30(GMT+8) | Lau Nim Yat (yellow card) 26'; Mbome 51' (yellow card) 70'; Carrijó (yellow card) 58'; Dodd (yellow card) 74'; Itaparica (yellow card) 76'; Poon Yiu Cheuk (yellow card) 83'; Wang Zhenpeng 90+1' (o.g.) | Report | (yellow card) 33' Dani Cancela; 36' Yago; (yellow card) 40' Jordi; (yellow card) 60' Recio; (yellow card) 78' Chu Siu Kei; (yellow card) 78' Roberto Losada | Stadium: Yuen Long Stadium (Capacity:4,932); Attendance: 2,224; Referee: Ng Chiu Kok; Assistant referees: Chow Chun Kit; Poon Ming Fai; Fourth official: Lam Chi Ho |

=== Round 12 ===
| 2 March 2012 | Hong Kong Sapling | 2–2 | TSW Pegasus | Kowloon Bay |
| 20:00(GMT+8) | Ramos 46' (yellow card) 83'; Choi Kwok Wai (yellow card) 63'; Cheung Kwok Ming (yellow card) 64'; Alex 71' (yellow card) 90' | Report | 28' Godfred; 90' Carrijo; (yellow card) 90' Mbome; (yellow card) 90' Dodd | Stadium: Kowloon Bay Park (Capacity:1,200); Attendance: 187; Referee: Tong Kui Sum; Assistant referees: Ng Kai Lam; Yu Chun San; Fourth official: Sarao, Amarjit Singh |

| 3 March 2012 | Wofoo Tai Po | 2–5 | Kitchee | Tai Po |
| 14:30(GMT+8) | Afonso (yellow card) 11'; To Hon To 19'; William Carlos Gomes 41'; Annan (yellow card) 72' | Report | Afonso 4' (o.g.); Lam Ka Wai 13'; Fernando Recio (yellow card) 30'; Jordi Tarrés 49', 54'; Losada 78' | Stadium: Tai Po Sports Ground (Capacity:3,000) |

| 3 March 2012 | Citizen | 2–2 | Biu Chun Rangers | Mong Kok |
| 17:30(GMT+8) | | | | Stadium: Mong Kok Stadium (Capacity:6,680) |

| 4 March 2012 | Sunray Cave JC Sun Hei | 1–2 | Tuen Mun | Mong Kok |
| 14:30(GMT+8) | | | | Stadium: Mong Kok Stadium (Capacity:6,680) |

| 4 March 2012 | South China | 1–1 | Sham Shui Po | So Kon Po |
| 17:30(GMT+8) | | | | Stadium: Hong Kong Stadium (Capacity:40,000) |

=== Round 13 ===
| 15 March 2012 | Kitchee | 1–0 | Sham Shui Po | Tseung Kwan O |
| 20:00(GMT+8) | | | | Stadium: Tseung Kwan O Sports Ground (Capacity:3,500) |

| 17 March 2012 | Wofoo Tai Po | 0–4 | South China | Tai Po |
| 14:30(GMT+8) | | | | Stadium: Tai Po Sports Ground (Capacity:3,000) |

| 17 March 2012 | TSW Pegasus | 6–4 | Citizen | Yuen Long |
| 17:30(GMT+8) | | | | Stadium: Yuen Long Stadium (Capacity:4,932) |

| 18 March 2012 | Biu Chun Rangers | 1–1 | Tuen Mun | Tsing Yi |
| 14:30(GMT+8) | | | | Stadium: Tsing Yi Sports Ground (Capacity:1,500) |

| 18 March 2012 | Hong Kong Sapling | 1–1 | Sunray Cave JC Sun Hei | Kowloon Bay |
| 17:30(GMT+8) | | | | Stadium: Kowloon Bay Park (Capacity:1,200) |

=== Round 14 ===
| 29 March 2012 | Kitchee | 2–2 | South China | Tseung Kwan O |
| 20:00(GMT+8) | Lam Ka Wai 13'; Yago 53' | Report | Giovane 73'; Dhiego 87' | Stadium: Tseung Kwan O Sports Ground (Capacity:3,500); Attendance: 2,751 |

| 31 March 2012 | Sham Shui Po | 0–1 | Wofoo Tai Po | Sham Shui Po |
| 14:30(GMT+8) | | Report | Carlos 64' | Stadium: Sham Shui Po Sports Ground (Capacity:2,196); Attendance: 558 |

| 31 March 2012 | Citizen | 1–1 | Sunray Cave JC Sun Hei | Mong Kok |
| 17:30(GMT+8) | | | | Stadium: Mong Kok Stadium (Capacity:6,680); Attendance: 751 |

| 1 April 2012 | Tuen Mun | 1–1 | TSW Pegasus | Tuen Mun |
| 14:30(GMT+8) | | Report | | Stadium: Tuen Mun Tang Shiu Kin Sports Ground (Capacity:2,200); Attendance: 1,099 |

| 1 April 2012 | Hong Kong Sapling | 2–3 | Biu Chun Rangers | Kowloon Bay |
| 17:30(GMT+8) | | | | Stadium: Kowloon Bay Park (Capacity:1,200); Attendance: 152 |

=== Round 15 ===
| 28 January 2012 | Citizen | 1–0 | Sham Shui Po | Mong Kok |
| 14:30(GMT+8) | Moses (yellow card) 22'; Detinho 74'; Chiu Chun Kit (yellow card) 76' | | (yellow card) 49' Lau Cheuk Hin; (yellow card) 73' Fong Pak Lun; (yellow card) 81' Santos | Stadium: Mong Kok Stadium (Capacity:6,680); Attendance: 992; Referee: Liu Kwok Man |

| 29 January 2012 | Sunray Cave JC Sun Hei | 1–2 | Kitchee | Mong Kok |
| 14:30(GMT+8) | Barry 22'; Pak Wing Chak (yellow card) 27'; Leung Tsz Chun (yellow card) 46'; Pan Jia (yellow card) 54' | Report | 27' Jordi; 44' Yago; (yellow card) 62' Chao Pengfei | Stadium: Mong Kok Stadium (Capacity:6,680); Attendance: 2,026; Referee: Ng Kai Lam; Assistant referees: Chow Chun Kit; Lam Chi Ho; Fourth official: Ng Chiu Kok |

| 7 April 2012 | Biu Chun Rangers | 0–3 | TSW Pegasus | Mong Kok |
| 14:30(GMT+8) | | | | Stadium: Mong Kok Stadium (Capacity:6,680); Attendance: 1,087 |

| 7 April 2012 | Hong Kong Sapling | 2–3 | Wofoo Tai Po | Kowloon Bay Park |
| 17:30(GMT+8) | | | | Stadium: Kowloon Bay Park (Capacity:1,200) |

| 8 April 2012 | Tuen Mun | 1–1 | South China | Tuen Mun |
| 14:30(GMT+8) | | | | Stadium: Tuen Mun Tang Shiu Kin Sports Ground (Capacity:2,200) |

Note: Matches between Citizen and Sham Shui Po and between Sunray Cave JC Sun Hei and Kitchee were held in January 2012.
Note: The match between Biu Chun Rangers and TSW Pegasus was played at Mong Kok Stadium. (Originally at Tsing Yi Sports Ground)

=== Round 16 ===
| 19 April 2012 | Kitchee | 3–1 | Citizen | Tseung Kwan O |
| 20:00(GMT+8) | | | | Stadium: Tseung Kwan O Sports Ground (Capacity:3,500) |

| 21 April 2012 | Sham Shui Po | 2–1 | Biu Chun Rangers | Sham Shui Po |
| 14:30(GMT+8) | | | | Stadium: Sham Shui Po Sports Ground (Capacity:2,186) |

| 21 April 2012 | Sunray Cave JC Sun Hei | 2–1 | Wofoo Tai Po | Mong Kok |
| 17:30(GMT+8) | | | | Stadium: Mong Kok Stadium (Capacity:6,680) |

| 22 April 2012 | Tuen Mun | 3–0 | Hong Kong Sapling | Tuen Mun |
| 14:30(GMT+8) | | | | Stadium: Tuen Mun Tang Shiu Kin Sports Ground (Capacity:2,200) |

| 22 April 2012 | South China | 4–0 | TSW Pegasus | So Kon Po |
| 17:30(GMT+8) | | | | Stadium: Hong Kong Stadium (Capacity:40,000); Attendance: 2,037 |

=== Round 17 ===
| 3 May 2012 | Kitchee | 1–0 | Tuen Mun | Tseung Kwan O |
| 20:00(GMT+8) | | | | Stadium: Tseung Kwan O Sports Ground (Capacity:3,500) |

| 4 May 2012 | Biu Chun Rangers | 2–5 | South China | Tsing Yi |
| 14:30(GMT+8) | | | | Stadium: Tsing Yi Sports Ground (Capacity:1,500) |

| 5 May 2012 | TSW Pegasus | 4–0 | Wofoo Tai Po | Yuen Long |
| 17:30(GMT+8) | | | | Stadium: Yuen Long Stadium (Capacity:4,932) |

| 6 May 2012 | Sham Shui Po | 0–1 | Sunray Cave JC Sun Hei | Sham Shui Po |
| 14:30(GMT+8) | | | | Stadium: Sham Shui Po Sports Ground (Capacity:2,196) |

| 15 May 2012 | Citizen | 0–2 | Hong Kong Sapling | Mong Kok |
| 20:00(GMT+8) | | | | Stadium: Mong Kok Stadium (Capacity:6,680) |

Note: The match between Biu Chun Rangers and South China AA will be played at Mong Kok Stadium. (Originally at Tsing Yi Sports Ground)

- Due to unstable weather condition, the bma First Division League match between Citizen and HK Sapling which held at Mongkok Stadium tonight (4 May 2012) had been abandoned and rescheduled to 15 May 2012

=== Round 18 ===
| 18 May 2012 | TSW Pegasus | 1–2 | Sunray Cave JC Sun Hei | Yuen Long |
| 20:00(GMT+8) | | | | Stadium: Yuen Long Stadium (Capacity:4,932) |

| 19 May 2012 | Sham Shui Po | 1–2 | Hong Kong Sapling | Sham Shui Po |
| 14:30(GMT+8) | | | | Stadium: Sham Shui Po Sports Ground (Capacity:2,196) |

| 19 May 2012 | South China | 2–2 | Citizen | So Kon Po |
| 17:30(GMT+8) | | | | Stadium: Hong Kong Stadium (Capacity:40,000) |

| 20 May 2012 | Tuen Mun | 3–2 | Wofoo Tai Po | Tuen Mun |
| 14:30(GMT+8) | | | | Stadium: Tuen Mun Tang Shiu Kin Sports Ground (Capacity:2,200) |

| 20 May 2012 | Kitchee | 4–1 | Biu Chun Rangers | Tseung Kwan O |
| 17:30(GMT+8) | | | | Stadium: Tseung Kwan O Sports Ground (Capacity:3,500) |

== Season statistics ==
=== Top scorers ===
| Rank | Player | Club | Goals |
|---|---|---|---|
| 1 | Sandro | Biu Chun Rangers | 11 |
| 1 | Itaparica | TSW Pegasus | 11 |
| 3 | Leandro Carrijo | TSW Pegasus | 10 |
| 4 | Godfred Karikari | TSW Pegasus | 9 |
| 6 | Roberto Losada | Kitchee | 8 |
| 6 | Mamadou Barry | Sunray Cave JC Sun Hei | 8 |
| 8 | Alex Tayo Akande | Hong Kong Sapling | 7 |

=== Hat-tricks ===
| Player | For | Against | Result | Date |
|---|---|---|---|---|
| Godfred Karikari | TSW Pegasus | Sham Shui Po | WIN 4–0 | 24 September 2011 |
| Lo Chi Kwan | Kitchee | Hong Kong Sapling | WIN 6–0 | 25 September 2011 |
| Mamadou Barry | Sunray Cave JC Sun Hei | Sham Shui Po | WIN 5–0 | 16 October 2011 |
| Ling Cong | Tuen Mun | Sham Shui Po | WIN 2–6 | 23 October 2011 |
| Yuto Nakamura | Citizen | Sunray Cave JC Sun Hei | WIN 2–3 | 16 December 2011 |
| Sandro | Biu Chun Rangers | Hong Kong Sapling | WIN 4–0 | 18 December 2011 |

=== Scoring ===
- First goal of the season: Leung Tsz Chun for Sunray Cave JC Sun Hei against Kitchee (3 September 2011)
- Widest winning margin: 6 goals
  - Kitchee 6–0 Hong Kong Sapling (25 September 2011)
- Highest scoring game: 10 goals
  - TSW Pegasus 6–4 Citizen (17 March 2012)
- Most goals scored in a match by a single team: 6 goals
  - Kitchee Kitchee 6–0 Hong Kong Sapling (25 September 2011)
  - Sham Shui Po Sham Shui Po 2–6 Tuen Mun (23 October 2011)
  - Kitchee Biu Chun Rangers 2–6 Kitchee (8 January 2012)
  - TSW Pegasus TSW Pegasus 6–4 Citizen (17 March 2012)
- Most goals scored in a match by a losing team: 4 goals
  - Citizen TSW Pegasus 6–4 Citizen (17 March 2012)

=== Clean Sheets ===
- Most Clean Sheets: 7
  - South China

== Awards ==
=== Monthly awards ===
==== HKSPA Most Valuable Player of the Month ====
| Month | HKSPA Most Valuable Player of the Month | |
| Month | Player | Club |
|---|---|---|
| September | Godfred Karikari | TSW Pegasus |
| October | Cheng Siu Wai | Sunray Cave JC Sun Hei |
| November | Hou Yu | Sunray Cave JC Sun Hei |
| December | Joel | South China |
| January | Jordi Tarrés | Kitchee |
| February | Cristiano Cordeiro | Sunray Cave JC Sun Hei |
| March | Lam Ka Wai | Kitchee |
| April | Lo Kwan Yee | Kitchee |

==== Keymansoho Best Eleven of the Month ====
| Month | Keymansoho Best Eleven of the Month | | | | | | | |
| Month | Goalkeeper | Club | Defenders | Clubs | Midfielders | Clubs | Forwards | Clubs |
|---|---|---|---|---|---|---|---|---|
| September | Tse Tak Him | Citizen | Jack Sealy; Ng Wai Chiu; Jean-Jacques Kilama; Cheung Kin Fung | Sun Hei; South China; Sun Hei; TSW Pegasus | Chan Man Fai; Dane Milovanovic; Itaparica; Cheng Siu Wai | Kitchee; Sun Hei; TSW Pegasus; Sun Hei | Roberto Losada; Godfred Karikari | Kitchee; TSW Pegasus |
| October | Pang Tsz Kin | Wofoo Tai Po | Jack Sealy; Ng Wai Chiu; Clayton Afonso; Cheung Kin Fung | Sun Hei; South China; Wofoo Tai Po; TSW Pegasus | Lee Wai Lim; Dane Milovanovic; Gao Wen; Cheng Siu Wai | Kitchee; Sun Hei; Kitchee; Sun Hei | Jaimes McKee; Christian Annan | TSW Pegasus; Wofoo Tai Po |
| November | Hou Yu | Sun Hei | Jack Sealy; Lucas; Chiu Chun Kit; Cheung Kin Fung | Sun Hei; TSW Pegasus; Citizen; TSW Pegasus | Paulinho; Huang Yang; Itaparica; Cheng Siu Wai | Citizen; Kitchee; TSW Pegasus; Sun Hei | Detinho; Leandro Carrijó | Citizen; TSW Pegasus |
| December | Yapp Hung Fai | South China | Jack Sealy; Joel; Chan Wai Ho; Wong Chin Hung | Sun Hei; South China; South China; South China | Paulinho; Bai He; Itaparica; Lee Hong Lim | Citizen; South China; TSW Pegasus; TSW Pegasus | Yuto Nakamura; Chan Siu Ki | Citizen; South China |
| First Leg | Hou Yu | Sun Hei | Jack Sealy; Chan Wai Ho; Joel; Cheung Kin Fung | Sun Hei; South China; South China; TSW Pegasus | Paulinho; Milutin Trnavać; Itaparica; Cheng Siu Wai | Citizen; Tuen Mun; TSW Pegasus; Sun Hei | Godfred Karikari; Sandro | TSW Pegasus; Biu Chun Rangers |
| February | Leung Hing Kit | Biu Chun Rangers | Lee Wai Lun; Ng Wai Chiu; Cristiano Cordeiro; Wong Chin Hung | TSW Pegasus; TSW Pegasus; Sun Hei; South China | João Emir; Lam Hok Hei; Chan Man Fai | South China; Biu Chun Rangers; Kitchee | Godfred Karikari; Sandro; Dhiego Martins | TSW Pegasus; Biu Chun Rangers; South China |
