= 2011–12 Hong Kong Senior Shield =

Tournament details
- Country: Hong Kong
- Teams: 10

Final positions
- Champions: Sunray Cave JC Sun Hei (2nd title)
- Runners-up: South China

Tournament statistics
- Matches played: 17
- Goals scored: 45 (2.65 per match)
- Attendance: 31,163 (1,833 per match)
- Top goal scorer(s): (Brazil) Itaparica (TSW Pegasus); 4 goals

Awards
- Best player: (China) Hou Yu (Sunray Cave JC Sun Hei)

2011–12 Hong Kong Senior Shield was the 110th season of one of the Asian oldest football knockout competitions, Hong Kong Senior Shield. Starting from this season, the format changed into a two-legged home-and-away ties competition. The winner Sunray Cave JC Sun Hei had guaranteed a place in the 2013 AFC Cup.

== Calendar ==
Stage	Round	Draw Date	Date of First Round	Date of Second Round
Knockout	Round 1	20 September 2011	1 – 2 October 2011	6 – 9 October 2011
Knockout	Quarter-final	20 September 2011	29 October 2011 – 30 October 2011	24 November 2011 – 27 November 2011
Knockout	Semi-final	20 September 2011	10 December 2011 – 11 December 2011	24 December 2011 – 25 December 2011
Knockout	Final	20 September 2011	18 February 2012 at Hong Kong Stadium	

== Bracket ==
The following bracket doesn't show first round matches.

Quarterfinals
1	Wofoo Tai Po	1	1	2
8	Sunray Cave JC Sun Hei	2	2	4
4	Citizen	2	1	3
5	Tuen Mun	2	2	4
2	South China	1	2	3
7	Sham Shui Po	1	1	2
3	Biu Chun Rangers	0	0	0
6	TSW Pegasus	5	4	9

Semifinals
Sunray Cave JC Sun Hei	1	2	3
Tuen Mun	0	2	2
South China	2	1	3
TSW Pegasus	2	0	2

Finals
Sunray Cave JC Sun Hei (p)
South China

== Match Records ==
=== First round ===
1 October 2011 1st leg	TSW Pegasus	1 – 1	Kitchee	Yuen Long
17:45	McKee 17'; Godfred (yellow card) 36'; Lau Nim Yat (yellow card) 64'; Takada (yellow card) 90'	Report	(yellow card) 14' Chu Siu Kei; (yellow card) 18' (yellow-red card) 79' Chan Man Fai; (yellow card) 40' Luzardo; (yellow card) 47' Liu Quankun; (yellow card) 54' Huang Yang; 72' Jordi; (yellow card) 77' Dani	Stadium: Yuen Long Stadium (Capacity:4,932); Attendance: 1,575; Referee: Ng Chiu Kok; Assistant referees: Chow Chun Kit; Ho Wai Sing; Fourth official: Ng Chin Pan

6 October 2011 2nd leg	Kitchee	0 – 1 (1 – 2 agg.)	TSW Pegasus	Tseung Kwan O
20:00(GMT+8)	Michael (yellow card) 58'; Luzardo (yellow card) 72'; Wang Zhenpang (yellow card) 79'; Chu Siu Kei (yellow card) 90'	Report	(yellow card) 6' Godfred; 19' McKee; (yellow card) 37' Cheung Kin Fung; (yellow card) 68' Chan Ming Kong; (yellow card) 90' Takada	Stadium: Tseung Kwan O Sports Ground (Capacity:3,500); Attendance: 921; Referee: Charlton Wong Chi Tang; Assistant referees: Cheng Oi Cho; Lam Chi Ho; Fourth official: Franky Lam Shing Yan

2 October 2011 1st leg	Tuen Mun	3 – 0	Hong Kong Sapling	Tuen Mun
14:30(GMT+8)	Leung Kwok Wai (yellow card) 18'; Law Ka Lok (yellow card) 27'; Milutin 32' (pen.), 63'; Lin Zhong 45'; Chu Kwok Leung (yellow card) 51'	Report	(yellow card) 31' Iu Wai; (yellow card) 62' Tsang Chi Hau; (yellow card) 68' Chan Cham Hei	Stadium: Tuen Mun Tang Shiu Kin Sports Ground (Capacity:2,200); Attendance: 710; Referee: Cheng Oi Cho; Assistant referees: Tong Kui Sum; Franky Lam Shing Yan; Fourth official: Lam Nai Kei

9 October 2011 2nd leg	Hong Kong Sapling	0 – 0 (0 – 3 agg.)	Tuen Mun	Kowloon Bay
17:30(GMT+8)		Report	(yellow card) 27' Mijanović; (yellow card) 42' Law Ka Lok; (yellow card) 71' Chow Cheuk Fung	Stadium: Kowloon Bay Park (Capacity:1,200); Attendance: 317; Referee: Pau Sai Yin; Assistant referees: Chan Shui Hung; Lui Siu Chuen; Fourth official: Liu Kwok Man

=== Quarter-finals ===
30 October 2011 1st leg	Wofoo Tai Po	1 – 2	Sunray Cave JC Sun Hei	Tai Po
14:30(GMT+8)	Lui Chi Hing (yellow card) 13'; Christian (yellow card) 22'; Chen Liming 45'	Report	11' Wong Chun Yue; (yellow card) 20' Milovanovic; 33' (yellow card) 90' Leung Tsz Chun	Stadium: Tai Po Sports Ground (Capacity:3,000); Attendance: 979; Referee: Ng Chiu Kok; Assistant referees: Chow Chun Kit; Lui Siu Chuen; Fourth official: Ng Chin Pang

27 November 2011 2nd leg	Sunray Cave JC Sun Hei	2 – 1 (4 - 2 agg.)	Wofoo Tai Po	Mong Kok
17:00(GMT+8)	Wong Chun Ho (yellow card) 16'; Cheng Siu Wai 29' (yellow card) 90'; Leung Tsz Chun (yellow card) 67'; Barry 77'	Report	60' Christian; (yellow card) 68' Clayton; (yellow card) 89' Gomes	Stadium: Mong Kok Stadium (Capacity:6,680); Attendance: 2,375; Referee: Tong Kui Sum; Assistant referees: Charlton Wong Chi Tang; Lui Siu Chuen; Fourth official: Franky Lam Shing Yan

29 October 2011 1st leg	Tuen Mun	2 – 2	Citizen	Tuen Mun
14:30(GMT+8)	Bamnjo 11'; Law Ka Lok (yellow card) 54'; Wong Chi Chung (yellow card) 82'; Leung Kwok Wai (yellow card) 85'; Ling Cong (yellow card) 89'; Chow Cheuk Fung 90'	Report	(yellow card) 48' Amaury; 73' Helio; 86' Paulinho	Stadium: Tuen Mun Tang Shiu Kin Sports Ground (Capacity:2,200); Attendance: 931; Referee: Cheng Oi Cho; Assistant referees: Chow Chun Kit; Lam Nai Kei; Fourth official: Franky Lam Shing Yan

26 November 2011 2nd leg	Citizen	1 – 2 (3 – 4 agg.)	Tuen Mun	Mong Kok
14:30(GMT+8)	Chan Man Chun (yellow card) 23'; Detinho 81' (yellow card) 82'; Wong Yiu Fu (yellow card) 90'	Report	(yellow card) 25' Mirko; 34' (pen.) (yellow card) 74' Milutin; 87' Makhosonke; (yellow card) 89' (yellow-red card) 90' Chan Hin Kwong	Stadium: Mong Kok Stadium (Capacity:6,680); Attendance: 1,360; Referee: Ng Kai Lam; Assistant referees: Lam Chi Ho; Chung Ming Sang; Fourth official: Pau Sai Yin

29 October 2011 1st leg	Sham Shui Po	1 – 1	South China	Mong Kok
17:30(GMT+8)	Leung Kwun Chung (yellow card) 30'; Fernando (yellow card) 34'; Lo Kong Wai 42' (yellow card) 74'; Fong Pak Lun (yellow card) 79'	Report	7' Ng Wai Chiu; (yellow card) 33' Joel; (yellow card) 78' Li Haiqiang	Stadium: Mong Kok Stadium (Capacity:6,680); Attendance: 2,105; Referee: Charlton Wong Chi Tang; Assistant referees: Tong Kui Sum; Poon Ming Fai; Fourth official: Chan Ming Siu

24 November 2011 2nd leg	South China	2 – 1 (3 – 2 agg.)	Sham Shui Po	So Kon Po
20:00(GMT+8)	Ng Wai Chiu (yellow card) 46'; Man Pei Tak (yellow card) 58'; Xu Deshuai 62'; Chan Siu Ki 88'	Report	(yellow card) 49' Fernando; (yellow card) 64' Lam Ngai Tong; 78' Fong Pak Lun	Stadium: Hong Kong Stadium (Capacity:40,000); Attendance: 1,219; Referee: Cheng Oi Cho; Assistant referees: Chan Shui Hung; Chow Chun Kit; Fourth official: Ho Wai Sing

30 October 2011 1st leg	TSW Pegasus	5 – 0	Biu Chun Rangers	Yuen Long
17:30(GMT+8)	Itaparica 15' (pen.), 54' (pen.); Lau Nim Yat (yellow card) 22'; Fan Qunxiao (yellow card) 25'; Lee Hong Lim 45'; Carrijo 67'; Li Ka Chun 82'	Report	(yellow card) 13' Leung Hing Kit; (yellow card) 14' Sandro; (yellow card) 25' de Buisson; (yellow card) 53' Chak Ting Fung; (yellow card) 87' Yan Minghao	Stadium: Yuen Long Stadium (Capacity:4,932); Attendance: 983; Referee: Tong Kui Sum; Assistant referees: Chan Shui Hung; Franky Lam Shing Yan; Fourth official: Yu Chun San

27 November 2011 2nd leg	Biu Chun Rangers	0 – 4 (0 - 9 agg.)	TSW Pegasus	Mong Kok
17:30 (GMT+8)	Tong Kin Man 43'	Report	(yellow card) 46' Fan Qunxiao; 65' Lucas; 86' Itaparical; 90' Jaimes Mckee; 90' Lau Ka Shing	Stadium: Mong Kok Stadium (Capacity:6,680); Attendance: 2,375; Referee: Ng Chiu Kok; Assistant referees: Chow Chun Kit; Lui Siu Chuen; Fourth official: Ng Chin Pang

=== Semi-finals ===
11 December 2011 1st leg	Tuen Mun	0 – 1	Sunray Cave JC Sun Hei	Tuen Mun
14:30(GMT+8)	Bamnjo (yellow card) 85'	Report	(yellow card) 20' J. Sealy; (yellow card) 22' Wong Chun Ho; (yellow card) 24' Barry; (yellow card) 74' Pan Jia 74'; 86' Kilama	Stadium: Tuen Mun Tang Shiu Kin Sports Ground (Capacity:2,200); Attendance: 1,195; Referee: Cheng Oi Cho; Assistant referees: Chan Shui Hung; Ho Wai Sing; Fourth official: Ng Chin Pang

24 December 2011 2nd leg	Sunray Cave JC Sun Hei	2 – 2 (3 – 2 agg.)	Tuen Mun	Mong Kok
14:30(GMT+8)	Barry (yellow card) 10' (goal) 86'; Cheng Siu Wai (yellow card) 58' (goal) 78'; Hou Yu (yellow card) 68' (yellow-red card) 90'; Li Hang Wui (yellow card) 79'; Pan Jia (yellow card) 83'	Report	2' (yellow card) 73' Bamnjo; (yellow card) 52' Milutin; (yellow card) 61' Mijanović; 90' Chan Hin Kwong; (yellow card) 90' Wong Chi Chung	Stadium: Mong Kok Stadium (Capacity:6,680); Attendance: 1,820; Referee: Ng Chiu Kok; Assistant referees: Liu Kwok Man; Lam Nai Kei; Fourth official: Lui Siu Chuen

10 December 2011 1st leg	TSW Pegasus	2 – 2	South China	Yuen Long
14:30(GMT+8)	Chan Ming Kong (yellow card) 16'; Lee Wai Lun (yellow card) 32'; Godfred (yellow card) 55'; Fan Qunxiao (yellow card) 63'; Cheung Kin Fung 66'; Deng Jinghuang (yellow card) 77'; Itaparica 88' (yellow card) 90'	Report	(yellow card) 9' Joel; 65' Chan Siu Ki; 67' Au Yeung Yiu Chung; (yellow card) 69' Leung Chun Pong	Stadium: Yuen Long Stadium (Capacity:4,932); Attendance: 2,092; Referee: Tong Kui Sum; Assistant referees: Liu Kwok Man; Poon Ming Fai; Fourth official: Lam Nai Kei

25 December 2011 2nd leg	South China	1 – 0 (3 – 2 agg.)	TSW Pegasus	So Kon Po
16:00(GMT+8)	Joel 4' (yellow card) 24'; Bai He (yellow card) 31'; Au Yeung Yiu Chung (yellow card) 36'	Report	(yellow card) 27' Lau Nim Yat; (yellow card) 47' Carrijó; (yellow card) 64' Dodd	Stadium: Hong Kong Stadium (Capacity:40,000); Attendance: 3,972; Referee: Ng Kai Lam; Assistant referees: Chow Chun Kit; Chung Ming Sang; Fourth official: Franky Lam Shing Yan

=== Final ===
18 February 2012 Final	Sunray Cave JC Sun Hei	1 – 1 (a.e.t.) (5 – 3 p)	South China	So Kon Po
17:45(GMT+8)	Milovanovic 52'	Report	54' Chan Wai Ho	Stadium: Hong Kong Stadium (Capacity:40,000); Attendance: 6,234; Referee: Liu Kwok Man; Man of the Match: Hou Yu (Sunray Cave JC Sun Hei)
	Penalties
	Roberto (penalty scored); M. Luk (penalty scored); Wong Chun Yue (penalty scored); Kilama (penalty scored); Pan Jia (penalty scored)		(penalty scored) Wong Chin Hung; (penalty missed) Giovane; (penalty scored) Joel; (penalty scored) Chan Wai Ho

Sunray Cave JC Sun Hei	South China

SUNRAY CAVE JC SUN HEI:
GK	1	(China) Hou Yu	(yellow card) 120'
RB	5	(Hong Kong) Li Hang Wui	(red card) 56'
CB	3	(Hong Kong) Cristiano Cordeiro (c)
CB	6	(Cameroon) Jean-Jacques Kilama
LB	4	(Hong Kong) Pak Wing Chak	(yellow card) 63'
DM	28	(Brazil) Roberto
RM	10	(Canada) Michael Luk
CM	15	(Hong Kong) Wong Chun Ho
CM	7	(Australia) Dane Milovanovic	(yellow card) 89'	(substituted off) 90'
LM	19	(Hong Kong) Cheng Siu Wai	(yellow card) 77'	(substituted off) 84'
CF	9	(Guinea) Mamadou Barry		(substituted off) 105'
Substitutes:
GK	20	(Hong Kong) Ho Kwok Chuen
GK	22	(Hong Kong) Cheung King Wah
DF	12	(Hong Kong) Jack Sealy
DF	25	(Hong Kong) Wong Chun Yue		(substituted on) 84'
MF	16	(China) Pan Jia		(substituted on) 105'
FW	8	(Republic of the Congo) Edson Minga		(substituted on) 90'
FW	26	(Hong Kong) Leung Tsz Chun
Coach:
(Brazil) José Ricardo Rambo

SOUTH CHINA:
GK	1	(Hong Kong) Yapp Hung Fai
RB	2	(Hong Kong) Lee Chi Ho
CB	14	(Brazil) Joel
CB	15	(Hong Kong) Chan Wai Ho (c)
LB	6	(Hong Kong) Wong Chin Hung
RM	18	(Hong Kong) Kwok Kin Pong
CM	16	(Hong Kong) Leung Chun Pong
CM	10	(Hong Kong) Au Yeung Yiu Chung		(substituted off) 46'
LM	20	(Brazil) Emir		(substituted off) 90'
CF	7	(Hong Kong) Chan Siu Ki		(substituted off) 88'
CF	19	(Brazil) Dhiego	(yellow card) 80'
Substitutes:
GK	32	(Hong Kong) Fan Chun Yip
DF	3	(South Korea) Yeo Jee-Hoon
MF	5	(Hong Kong) Bai He
MF	8	(Hong Kong) Xu Deshuai
MF	9	(Hong Kong) Lee Wai Lim		(substituted on) 46'
MF	11	(Hong Kong) Li Haiqiang		(substituted on) 90'
FW	22	(Brazil) Giovane		(substituted on) 88'
Coach:
(Slovakia) Ján Kocian

MATCH OFFICIALS

- Assistant referees:
  - Chow Chun Kit
  - Chung Ming Sang
- Fourth official: Tong Kui Sum

MATCH RULES

- 90 minutes.
- 30 minutes of extra-time if necessary.
- Penalty shoot-out if scores still level.
- Seven named substitutes
- Maximum of 3 substitutions.

== Scorers ==
The scorers in the 2011–12 Hong Kong Senior Shield are as follows:

4 goals

- (Brazil) Itaparica (TSW Pegasus)

3 goals

- (Serbia) Milutin Trnavać (Tuen Mun)
- (England) Jaimes McKee (TSW Pegasus)

2 goals

- (Hong Kong) Chan Siu Ki (South China)
- (Cameroon) Wilfred Bamnjo (Tuen Mun)
- (Guinea) Mamadou Barry (Sunray Cave JC Sun Hei)
- (Hong Kong) Cheng Siu Wai (Sunray Cave JC Sun Hei)

1 goal

- (Hong Kong) Xu Deshuai (South China)
- (Hong Kong) Au Yeung Yiu Chung (South China)
- (Hong Kong) Ng Wai Chiu (South China)
- (Brazil) Joel (South China)
- (Hong Kong) Chan Wai Ho (South China)
- (Brazil) Hélio (Citizen)
- (Brazil) Detinho (Citizen)
- (Brazil) Paulinho Piracicaba (Citizen)
- (Spain) Jordi Tarrés (Kitchee)
- (China) Chen Liming (Wofoo Tai Po)
- (Ghana) Christian Annan (Wofoo Tai Po)
- (Hong Kong) Lo Kong Wai (Sham Shui Po)
- (Hong Kong) Fong Pak Lun (Sham Shui Po)
- (China) Ling Cong (Tuen Mun)
- (Hong Kong) Chan Hin Kwong (Tuen Mun)
- (Hong Kong) Chow Cheuk Fung (Tuen Mun)
- (South Africa) Makhosonke Bhengu (Tuen Mun)
- (Brazil) Lucas (TSW Pegasus)
- (Hong Kong) Li Ka Chun (TSW Pegasus)
- (Hong Kong) Cheung Kin Fung (TSW Pegasus)
- (Hong Kong) Lee Hong Lim (TSW Pegasus)
- (Hong Kong) Lau Ka Shing (TSW Pegasus)
- (Brazil) Leandro Carrijó (TSW Pegasus)
- (Australia) Dane Milovanovic (Sunray Cave JC Sun Hei)
- (Cameroon) Jean-Jacques Kilama (Sunray Cave JC Sun Hei)
- (Hong Kong) Wong Chun Yue (Sunray Cave JC Sun Hei)
- (Hong Kong) Leung Tsz Chun (Sunray Cave JC Sun Hei)

== Prizes ==
Top Scorer Award	Player of the Tournament
(Brazil) Itaparica (TSW Pegasus)	(China) Hou Yu (Sunray Cave JC Sun Hei)
