= 2015 Copa Constitució =

Tournament details
- Country: Andorra
- Teams: 16

Final positions
- Champions: UE Sant Julià
- Runners-up: FC Santa Coloma

Tournament statistics
- Matches played: 16
- Goals scored: 92 (5.75 per match)
- Top goal scorer(s): Gabi Riera (11 goals)

The 2015 Copa Constitució was the 23rd season of Andorra's national football knockout tournament. The competition began on 21 February 2015 with the matches of the first elimination round and ended on 10 May 2015 with the final. UE Sant Julià, the defending champions, won the tournament. The team earned a place in the first qualifying round of the 2015–16 UEFA Europa League.

A total of sixteen teams competed in the tournament.

== Results ==
=== First round ===
Sixteen teams entered this round, eight from 2014–15 Primera Divisió and eight from 2014–15 Segona Divisió. The matches were played on 21, 22 February and 1 March 2015.

Team 1	Score	Team 2
Penya Encarnada	0–3	UE Santa Coloma
Inter d'Escaldes	8–0	Encamp B
Unió Extremenya	0–5	Sant Julià
Engordany	2–2	Encamp
Lusitans B	0–9	FC Santa Coloma
UE Santa Coloma B	2–4	Ordino B
Rànger's	0–10	Lusitans
Ordino	11–0	La Massana

==== Replay ====
The match was played on 5 March 2015.

Team 1	Score	Team 2
Engordany	0–1	Encamp

=== Quarterfinals ===
The matches were played on 1, 3, 4 and 8 March 2015.

Team 1	Score	Team 2
FC Santa Coloma	14–0	Ordino B
UE Santa Coloma	3–1	Inter d'Escaldes
Lusitans	0–2	Ordino
Sant Julià	4–0	Encamp

=== Semifinals ===
The matches were played on 8 and 11 March 2015.

Team 1	Score	Team 2
FC Santa Coloma	4–3	Ordino
UE Santa Coloma	1–3	Sant Julià

=== Final ===
10 May 2015

FC Santa Coloma	1–1 (a.e.t.)	Sant Julià
Riera 100'		Guida 104'
Penalties
Ramos (penalty scored); Toscano (penalty scored); Juvenal (penalty scored); Martínez (penalty scored); Casals (penalty missed)	4–5	(penalty scored) Blanco; (penalty scored) Ruiz; (penalty scored) Gándara; (penalty scored) Varela; (penalty scored) Coca

Estadi Comunal d'Andorra la Vella
Referee: Robert González Salvado
