= Hou Yu (footballer, born 1990) =

Chinese association football player

Personal information
- Full name: Hou Yu
- Date of birth: 20 December 1990 (age 35)
- Place of birth: Guangzhou, China
- Height: 1.93 m (6 ft 4 in)
- Position: Goalkeeper

Senior career*
Years	Team	Apps	(Gls)
2007-2012	Guangdong Sunray Cave	12	(0)
2011–2012	→ Sun Hei (loan)	13	(0)
2013–2022	Meizhou Hakka	166	(0)
2024–2025	Guangzhou Dandelion Alpha	4	(0)
- * Club domestic league appearances and goals as of 17:12, 31 December 2022 (UTC)

Hou Yu (Chinese: 侯宇; pinyin: Hóu Yǔ; born 30 December 1990) is a Chinese former footballer who played as a goalkeeper.

== Club career ==
Hou Yu would start his career with Guangdong Sunray Cave in the 2007 league season and was part of the squad that won promotion with the team at the end of the 2008 China League Two season. He was often used as a substitute goalkeeper and was loaned out to Hong Kong football club Sun Hei where he had a successful period with them going on to establish himself as their first choice goalkeeper as they went on to win the 2011–12 Hong Kong Senior Challenge Shield cup with the club. Within the match he would personally win the MVP award as Sun Hei won 5–3 on penalties against South China. On his return to Guangdong, Hou was unable to go on to establish himself at his parent club and he joined third tier side Meizhou Hakka along with his teammate and fellow goalkeeper Li Weijun.

At Meizhou, Hou was used as the substitute goalkeeper behind Li Weijun as the club went on to win the 2015 China League Two division and promotion into the second tier. Li Weijun would retire at the end of the 2016 season and Hou was promoted to the clubs first choice goalkeeper where he quickly established himself as an integral member of the team as well as eventually becoming their captain. He would then go on to lead the team that gained promotion to the top tier after coming second within the division at the end of the 2021 China League One campaign.

On 29 January 2026, Hou was given a lifetime ban for match-fixing by the Chinese Football Association.

== Career statistics ==
As of 31 December 2022.

Club	Season	League			National Cup		League Cup		Continental		Total	
Club	Season	Division	Apps	Goals	Apps	Goals	Apps	Goals	Apps	Goals	Apps	Goals
Guangdong Sunray Cave	2007	China League Two	0	0	–		–		–		0	0
Guangdong Sunray Cave	2008	China League Two	0	0	–		–		–		0	0
Guangdong Sunray Cave	2009	China League One	0	0	–		–		–		0	0
Guangdong Sunray Cave	2010	China League One	9	0	–		–		–		9	0
Guangdong Sunray Cave	2011	China League One	0	0	0	0	–		–		0	0
Guangdong Sunray Cave	2012	China League One	3	0	1	0	–		–		4	0
Guangdong Sunray Cave	Total		12	0	1	0	0	0	0	0	13	0
Sun Hei (loan)	2011–12	Hong Kong First Division	13	0	1	0	5 (Note: Appearances in Hong Kong Senior Challenge Shield)	0	–		19	0
Meizhou Hakka	2013	China League Two	0	0	0	0	–		–		0	0
Meizhou Hakka	2014	China League Two	0	0	0	0	–		–		0	0
Meizhou Hakka	2015	China League Two	0	0	0	0	–		–		0	0
Meizhou Hakka	2016	China League One	0	0	0	0	–		–		0	0
Meizhou Hakka	2017	China League One	28	0	0	0	–		–		28	0
Meizhou Hakka	2018	China League One	30	0	0	0	–		–		30	0
Meizhou Hakka	2019	China League One	30	0	0	0	–		–		30	0
Meizhou Hakka	2020	China League One	14	0	1	0	–		–		15	0
Meizhou Hakka	2021	China League One	31	0	0	0	–		–		31	0
Meizhou Hakka	2022	Chinese Super League	33	0	1	0	–		–		34	0
Meizhou Hakka	Total		166	0	2	0	0	0	0	0	168	0
Career total			191	0	4	0	5	0	0	0	200	0

== Honours ==
=== Club ===
Sun Hei

- Hong Kong Senior Challenge Shield: 2011–12

Meizhou Hakka

- China League Two: 2015
