= Roger Kath =

Hong Kong footballer

Personal information
- Date of birth: February 18, 1984 (age 42)
- Position: Goalkeeper

Senior career*
| Years | Team | Apps | (Gls) |
- Santa Cruz Futebol Clube
- Hong Kong Pegasus FC
- * Club domestic league appearances and goals

Roger Henrique Kath (Chinese: 卡夫; born February 18, 1984), is a former association football goalkeeper. He played for FC Santa Cruz in Brazil.
