= Pan Jia =

Chinese association football player

Personal information
- Date of birth: 8 March 1992 (age 34)
- Height: 1.81 m (5 ft 11 in)
- Position: Midfielder

Senior career*
Years	Team	Apps	(Gls)
2007–2012	Guangdong Sunray Cave	65	(8)
2011–2012	→ Sun Hei (loan)	11	(1)
2013–2015	Meizhou Kejia		
2016–2019	Guangdong South China Tiger	35	(2)

International career
2009	China U23		
- * Club domestic league appearances and goals

Pan Jia (Chinese: 潘佳; pinyin: Pān Jiā; born 8 March 1992) is a Chinese footballer.

== Career statistics ==
=== Club ===
As of 29 May 2020.

Club	Season	League			Cup		Other		Total	
Club	Season	Division	Apps	Goals	Apps	Goals	Apps	Goals	Apps	Goals
Guangdong Sunray Cave	2009	China League One	19	3	–		0	0	19	3
Guangdong Sunray Cave	2010	China League One	22	3	–		0	0	22	3
Guangdong Sunray Cave	2011	China League One	9	0	2 (Note: Appearances in the Chinese FA Cup)	0	0	0	11	0
Guangdong Sunray Cave	2012	China League One	15	2	1	0	0	0	16	2
Guangdong Sunray Cave	Total		65	8	3	0	0	0	68	8
Sun Hei (loan)	2011–12	Hong Kong First Division	11	1	0	0	0	0	11	1
Meizhou Kejia	2014	China League Two	?	5	1	0	0	0	1	5
Meizhou Kejia	2015	China League Two	17	0	3	0	0	0	20	0
Guangdong South China Tiger	2016	China League Two	16	1	3	0	0	0	19	1
Guangdong South China Tiger	2017	China League Two	19	1	2	1	0	0	21	2
Career total			111	16	12	1	0	0	123	17
