= Dane Milovanović =

Australian footballer

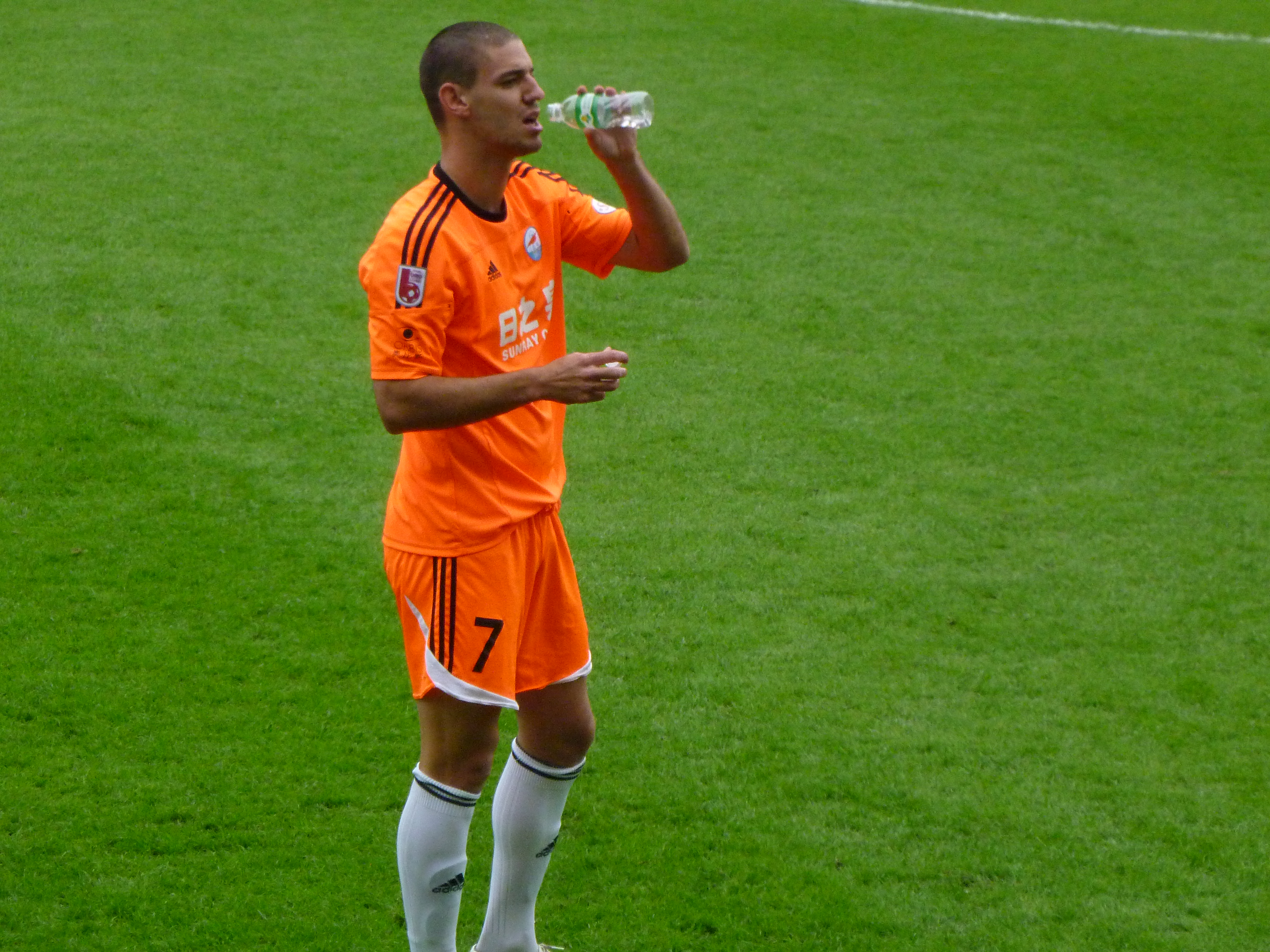

Personal information
- Full name: Dane Milovanović
- Date of birth: 2 December 1989 (age 36)
- Place of birth: Canberra, Australia
- Height: 1.89 m (6 ft 2 in)
- Position: Midfielder

Team information
- Current team: Westgate Sindjelic FC

Youth career
- 2007–2009: A.I S.
- 2009–2010: Adelaide United
- 2010–2011: Brisbane Roar

Senior career*
Years	Team	Apps	(Gls)
2010	Adelaide Cobras	8	(2)
2011	Oakleigh Cannons	17	(5)
2011–2012	Sun Hei	7	(0)
2012	Oakleigh Cannons	3	(0)
2012–2013	Pelita Bandung Raya	11	(3)
2013	Bentleigh Greens	7	(4)
2014	Ballarat Red Devils	4	(3)
2014	New Radiant	10	(4)
2015	South Melbourne	14	(0)
2015	HK Pegasus	0	(0)
2016–2017	Madura United	15	(5)
2018	Green Gully	6	(0)
2018	Preston Lions	12	(7)
2019	Madura United	0	(0)
2019	Canberra Olympic	2	(0)
2021	Heidelberg United	7	(1)
2021–2022	Green Gully	6	(0)
2022–	Sydenham Park SC	18	(0)
2025–	Westgate FC	0	(0)

International career
2004	Australia Schoolboys		
2005	Australia U17	4	(0)
2008	Australia U20	4	(0)
2010	Australia U23	1	(0)
- * Club domestic league appearances and goals as of 5 December 2022

Dane Milovanović (Serbian Cyrillic: Дане Миловановић; born 2 December 1989) is an Australian footballer who most recently played for Madura United in the Liga 1 as a defender or midfielder. He currently plays for Westgate Sindjelic FC in Victoria’s State League 1.

== Club career ==
=== Youth ===
Dane Milovanović went to the AIS as a 2008 Scholarship Holder. He then joined the youth squad of Adelaide United and Brisbane Roar FC. While in Adelaide he had a short stint at Adelaide Cobras in the FFSA Premier League. He later signed for Oakleigh Cannons in the Victorian Premier League.

=== Adelaide United ===
In 2010, he was member of Adelaide United. It participates in the A-League as the sole team from the state of South Australia. Adelaide is one of the most successful clubs in the A-League. Adelaide competed in the AFC Champions League in 2010 after finishing second on the A-League league table. At Adelaide United he managed to claim the National Youth League player of the season.

=== Sun Hei ===
In August 2011, he signed to play for Sun Hei of Hong Kong. He made his debut for Sun Hei on 3 September 2011 against Kitchee.

On 7 January 2011, in the top of the table clash against TSW Pegasus, Milovanović came on as a second-half substitute, but was sent off after two bookable offences as Sun Hei lost 1–3. He was the second Sun Hei player sent off in the match after Kilama. On 28 April 2012, it was revealed that he had already left Sunhei. He also played a pivotal role for Sun Hei in the Senior Shield Cup final help at the HongKong National Stadium, scoring the only goal for Sun Hei as they managed to win the game 5–4 on penalties to beat South China and claim the trophy.

=== Ballarat Red Devils ===
On 12 March 2014, Milovanovic was announced in the finalised Ballarat Red Devils squad for their inaugural National Premier League Victoria season. He left Ballarat in a midseason move to Maldives side New Radiant SC in June 2014.

=== South Melbourne ===
South Melbourne announced his signing ahead of the 2015 NPLV season on 22 December 2014.

=== Hong Kong Pegasus FC ===
In September 2015, Dane Milovanović joined Pegasus of Hong Kong. However, in December 2015, FIFA Disciplinary Committee decided that Dane Milovanovic will be banned world-wide for 12 games. Pegasus terminated Dane Milovanović then.

=== Madura United ===
In May 2016, Dane Milovanović joined Madura United. Then, in July 2017 he was released by Madura United due to being diagnosed with anxiety disorder.

=== Sydenham Park SC ===
In January 2022, Dane signed for Sydenham Park in Victoria’s state league 1. Dane is a marquee player and crowd favourite.

== International career ==
Dane Milovanović has represented Australia at Under-17, Under-20 and under-23 levels. In 2008, he has selected to play for the Australia national under-20 association football team to play in the 2008 AFF U-19 Youth Championship which was held in Thailand from 5–11 October 2008. Australia won the tournament. In 2010, he has selected to play for the Australia Olympic football team against Japan and Hong Kong in friendly match.

== Personal life ==
He was born in Australia and is of Serbian descent.

== Honours ==
=== Club ===
Sun Hei

- Hong Kong Senior Challenge Shield: 2011–12

=== International ===
Australia U20

- AFF U-19 Youth Championship: 2008
