= Choi Kwok-wai =

Hong Kong actor

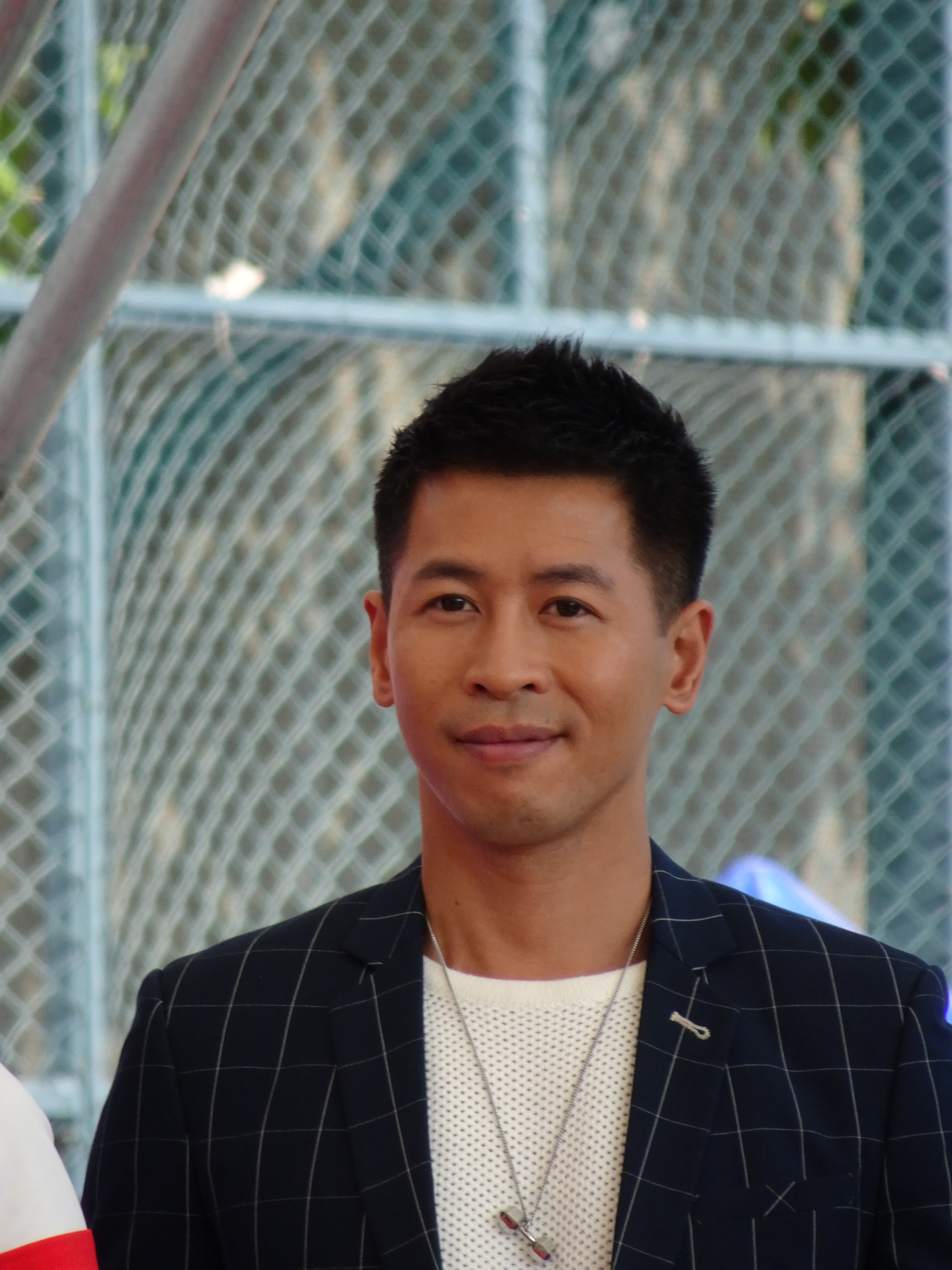
- Choi in 2018
- Born: Choi Kwok-wai; 28 August 1973 (age 52); British Hong Kong
- Occupation: Actor
- Years active: 1993-present

Chinese name
- Traditional Chinese: 蔡國威
- Simplified Chinese: 蔡国威
Transcriptions
Standard Mandarin
- Hanyu Pinyin: Cài Guówēi
Yue: Cantonese
- Jyutping: Choi5 Gwok2 Waai1
- Musical career
- Also known as: Frankie Choi
- Origin: Hong Kong

Choi Kwok-wai, also known as Frankie Choi (born 28 August 1973), is a Hong Kong ATV actor, most notable for his role as Bill in the film Moments of Love.

== Filmography ==
- Memento (2002)
- Moments of Love (2005)
- a料 (2007)
- a+料 (2007)
