= Liu Songwei =

Chinese-born Hong Kong footballer

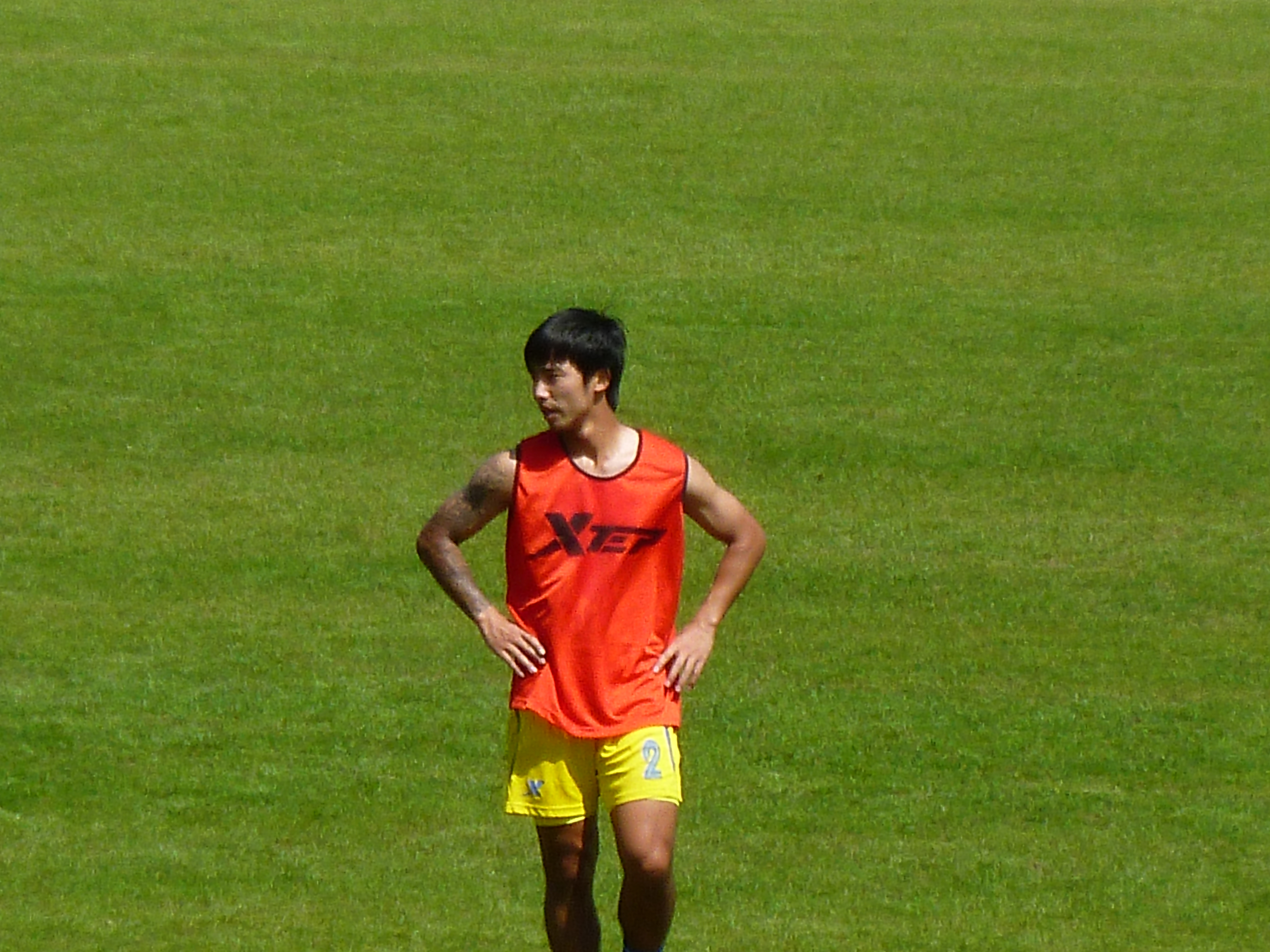

Personal information
- Full name: Liu Songwei
- Date of birth: 8 October 1989 (age 37)
- Place of birth: Shanghai, China
- Height: 1.76 m (5 ft 9 1/2 in)
- Position: Defender

Youth career
- 2005–2007: Shanghai United
- 2007–2008: Shanghai Shenhua

Senior career*
Years	Team	Apps	(Gls)
2008–2009	South China	1	(0)
2009–2012	Fourway	42	(0)
2012–2016	Hong Kong Rangers	63	(1)
2016–2018	Wuxi Yinyang		
2018–2019	Shenzhen Xinqiao		
2019–2020	Shanghai Huajiao		

International career
2011	Hong Kong U-23	6	(0)
2012	Hong Kong	3	(0)
- * Club domestic league appearances and goals

Liu Songwei or Liu Song Wei (simplified Chinese: 刘松伟; traditional Chinese: 劉松偉; born 8 October 1989 in Shanghai) is a football player. Born in China, he represented Hong Kong at international level.

== International career ==
As a Chinese citizen, he was eligible to play for the Hong Kong team after two years of residency.

On 1 June 2012, Liu Songwei made his international team debut in a friendly match against Singapore.

As of 16 October 2012

#	Date	Venue	Opponent	Result	Scored	Competition
1	1 June 2012	Hong Kong Stadium, Hong Kong	Singapore	1–0	0	Friendly
2	16 October 2012	Mong Kok Stadium, Mong Kok, Kowloon	Malaysia	0–3	0	Friendly
3	14 November 2012	Shah Alam Stadium, Shah Alam, Malaysia	Malaysia	1–1	0	Friendly

== External sources ==
- Profile in HKFA.
