= Andreu Ramos =

Spanish professional footballer

Personal information
- Full name: Andreu Ramos Isusu
- Date of birth: 19 January 1989 (age 37)
- Place of birth: La Seu d'Urgell, Spain
- Height: 1.80 m (5 ft 11 in)
- Position: Defender

Youth career
- Barcelona

Senior career*
| Years | Team | Apps | (Gls) |
| 2007–2008 | Damm | 30 | (1) |
| 2008–2010 | Ibiza | 10 | (0) |
| 2009–2010 | → Hamilton Academical U21 (loan) | 7 | (0) |
| 2010 | Balaguer | 4 | (0) |
| 2010–2011 | Gramenet | 16 | (2) |
| 2011–2012 | King Fung FC | 14 | (6) |
| 2012–2013 | Club Guaraní | 4 | (0) |
| 2013– | FC Santa Coloma | 186 | (19) |
- * Club domestic league appearances and goals

Andreu Ramos Isus (born 19 January 1989) is a Spanish professional footballer who plays as a defender for Santa Coloma in Andorra.

== Career ==
Ramos started his senior career in Barcelona with their former clubs CF Damm and Barcelona. After that, he played for UD Ibiza, Hamilton Academical, CF Balaguer, and UDA Gramenet. In 2011, he signed for King Fung in the Hong Kong Premier League, where he made seventeen appearances and scored seven goals. Worldwide known as "Bakalao". Known for his frequent clashes with the fans, technical team... He holds the record for more expulsions than games played.
