= Milutin Trnavac =

Serbian footballer

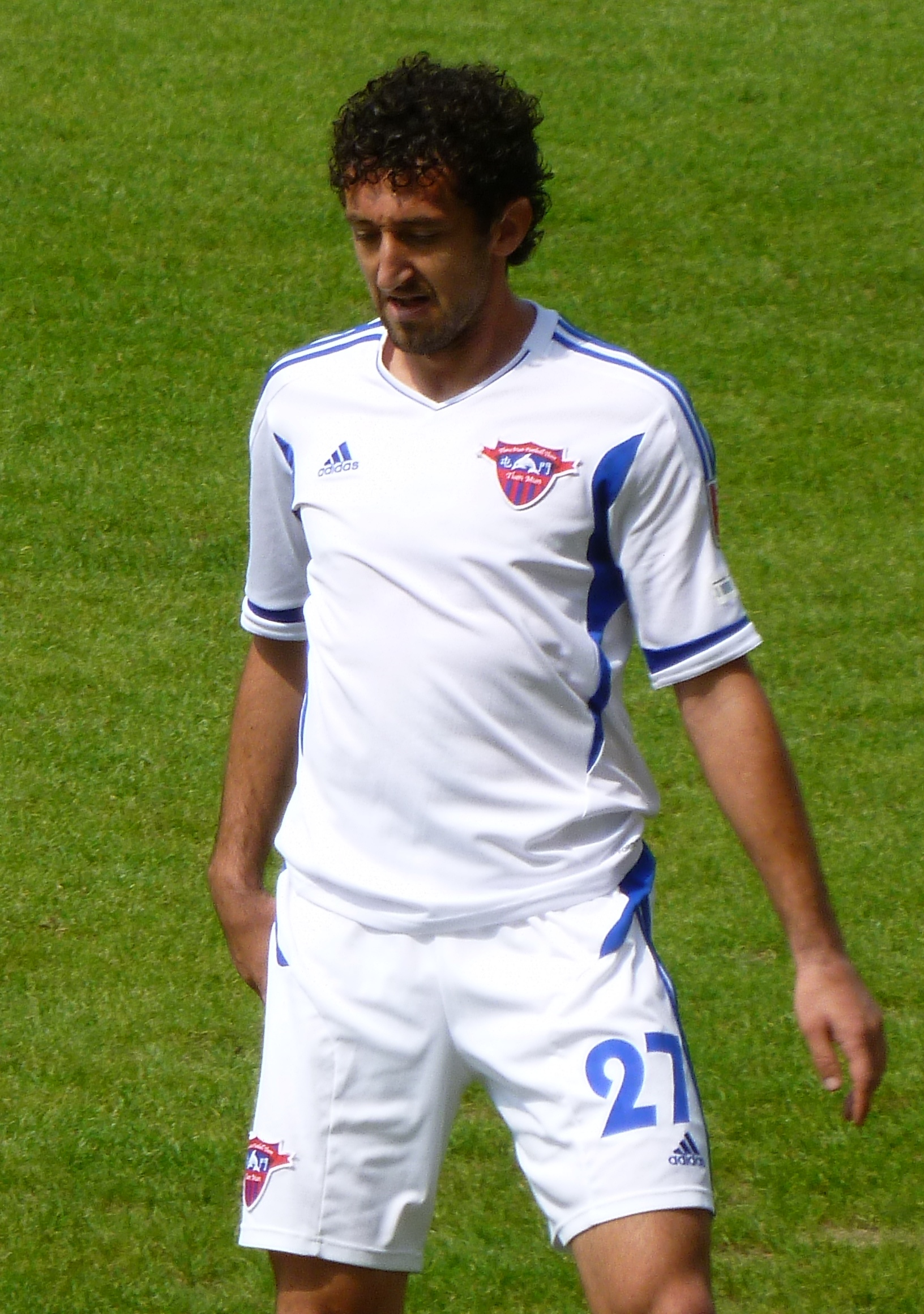
- Trnavac with Tuen Mun in 2012

Personal information
- Full name: Milutin Trnavac
- Date of birth: 13 May 1979 (age 47)
- Place of birth: Kraljevo, SFR Yugoslavia
- Height: 1.81 m (5 ft 11 1/2 in)
- Position: Midfielder

Team information
- Current team: Polet Ratina

Senior career*
Years	Team	Apps	(Gls)
1997–2000	Sloga Kraljevo		
2000–2003	Novi Sad	66	(2)
2003–2007	Mladost Apatin	122	(20)
2007–2008	Banat Zrenjanin	30	(1)
2008–2009	Zalaegerszeg	5	(0)
2009–2010	Sloga Kraljevo	31	(3)
2010–2012	Tuen Mun	32	(6)
2012–2013	Sloga Kraljevo	26	(5)
2013–2015	Kolubara	23	(1)
2014	→ Železničar Lajkovac (loan)	11	(0)
2015	Sloga Kraljevo	14	(0)
2016–2017	Radnički Kovači		
2018–	Polet Ratina		
- * Club domestic league appearances and goals as of 14 August 2016

Milutin Trnavac (Serbian Cyrillic: Милутин Трнавац; born 13 May 1979 in Kraljevo) is a Serbian retired footballer who played predominantly as a midfielder.

== Club career ==
Trnavac started his career with Sloga Kraljevo in 1997. Trnavac then played for Novi Sad until 2003. Trnavac also played for Mladost Apatin and Banat Zrenjanin in the Serbian SuperLiga.

In 2008, Trnavac joined Hungarian club Zalaegerszegi TE. In 2009, Trnavac returned to Sloga Kraljevo. In 2010, Trnavac joined Hong Kong First Division League side Tuen Mun.

In the summer of 2012, Trnavac again returned to Sloga Kraljevo. In the summer of 2013, Trnavac joined Kolubara of the Serbian League Belgrade.

== Club statistics ==
Club	Season	League		FA Cup		League Cup		Senior Shield		Asia		Total	
Club	Season	Apps	Goals	Apps	Goals	Apps	Goals	Apps	Goals	Apps	Goals	Apps	Goals
Tuen Mun	2010–11	17	1	2	0	1	0	1	0	0	0	21	1
Tuen Mun	2011–12	15	5	1	0	2	0	6	3	0	0	24	8
Tuen Mun	Total	32	6	3	0	3	0	7	3	0	0	45	9
