= Mossoró (footballer, born 1985) =

Brazilian footballer

Personal information
- Birth name: João Batista Lima Gomes
- Date of birth: June 24, 1985 (age 41)
- Place of birth: São Paulo, Brazil
- Height: 1.81 m (5 ft 11 in)
- Position: Striker

Senior career*
Years	Team	Apps	(Gls)
2004–2005	Al-Hilal		
2006	Ponte Preta		
2007	Friburguense		(6)
2007–2011	Estrela da Amadora		
2011–??	Tai Po FC	1	(1)
- * Club domestic league appearances and goals as of 22 August 2011

Mossoró (born João Batista Lima Gomes, also known as Lima; born 24 June 1985), is a Brazilian footballer who played for Wofoo Tai Po FC. in the 2010-11 Hong Kong First Division League.

== Career ==
=== Tai Po FC ===
Mossoró's signing was confirmed on 22 August 2011 and he will travel with the team to Thailand for pre-season training. On 11 September 2011, Lima made his debut and scored in a 3:0 win over Hong Kong Sapling.
