= Fong Pak Lun =

Hong Kong footballer (born 1993)

Fong Pak Lun 方柏倫
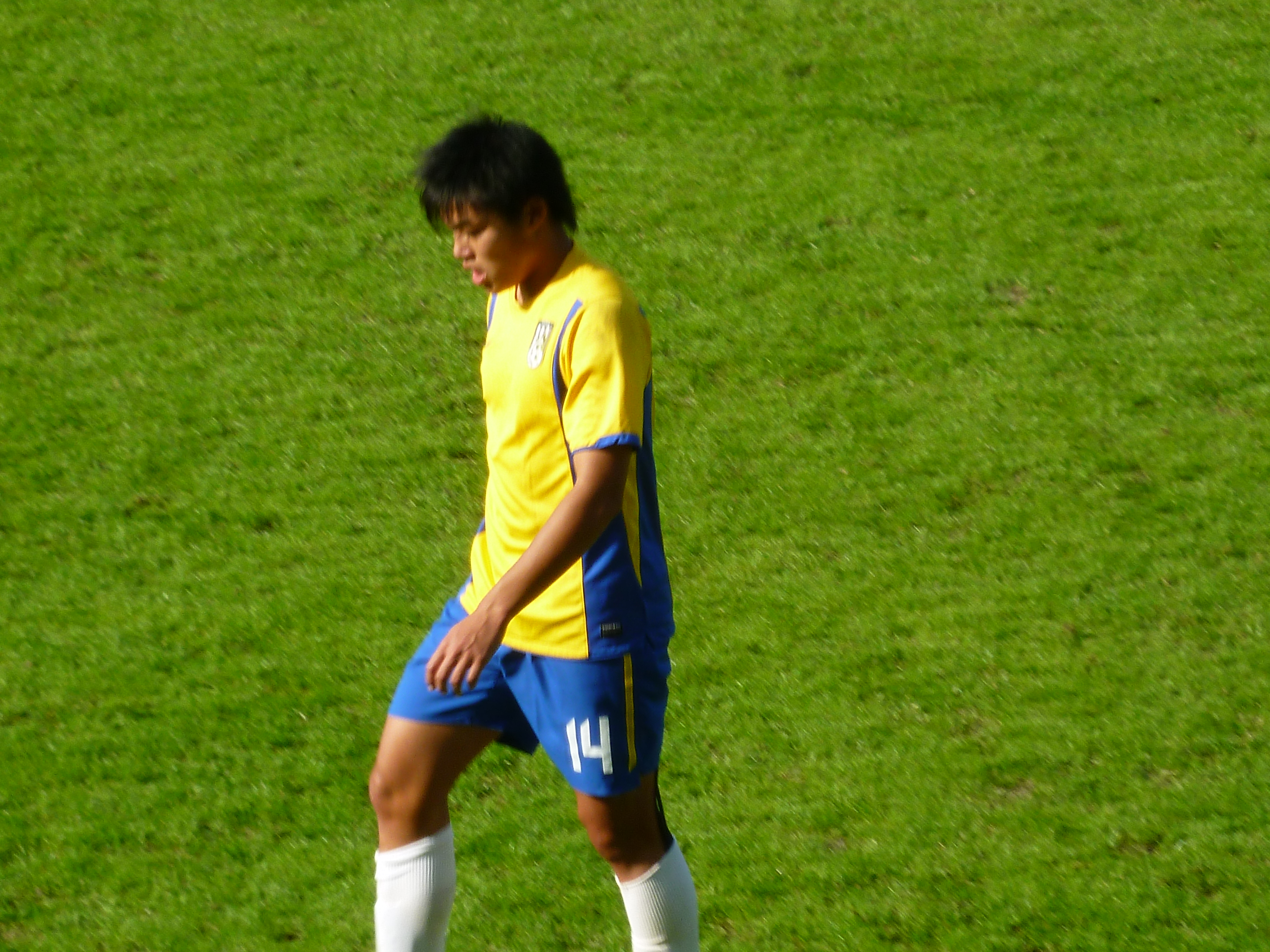

Personal information
- Full name: Fong Pak Lun
- Date of birth: 14 April 1993 (age 33)
- Place of birth: Hong Kong
- Height: 1.82 m (6 ft 0 in)
- Positions: Left back; winger

Senior career*
Years	Team	Apps	(Gls)
2008–2012	Sham Shui Po	17	(0)
2012–2014	Yokohama FC Hong Kong	27	(1)
2014	Shenyang Zhongze	4	(0)
2015	YFCMD	7	(1)
2015–2018	Pegasus	44	(3)
2018–2019	Lee Man	15	(1)
2019–2020	R&F	9	(0)
2020–2021	Pegasus	17	(0)
2021–2022	Tai Po	11	(2)

International career^{‡}
2011–2012	Hong Kong U-19	1	(0)
2011–2014	Hong Kong U-22	8	(0)
2012–2016	Hong Kong	4	(0)
- * Club domestic league appearances and goals as of 26 August 2021 ‡ National team caps and goals as of 6 October 2016

Fong Pak Lun (Chinese: 方柏倫; Cantonese Yale: Fōng Paaklèun, born 14 April 1993) is a former Hong Kong professional footballer who played as a left back.

== Club career ==
=== Sham Shui Po ===
On 24 November 2011, Fong scored a goal against South China in the 2011–12 Hong Kong Senior Shield. However, Sham Shui Po lost the match 2–1. On 14 January 2012, Fong scored with a header from a Wong Wai corner kick. The goal was enough to give Sham Shui Po victory over Hong Kong Sapling and send the team into the quarter-finals of the 2011–12 Hong Kong League Cup, it was also Sham Shui Po's first victory in Hong Kong football's top flight.

=== Yokohama FC (Hong Kong) ===
In the 2013–14 season, Fong joins Yokohama FC Hong Kong along with many of his Sham Shui Po teammates and coach Lee Chi-Kin.

=== Shenyang Zhongze ===
Fong is recruited by Shenyang Zhongze for RMB 100,000, after impressing the club with his performances in the 2013 East Asian Games. Fong left Hong Kong to join the club on 24 February 2014, after winning the last match for Yokohama FC (HK) 4–1 over Biu Chun Rangers.

=== R&F ===
On 19 June 2019, R&F head coach Yeung Ching Kwong revealed that Fong would join the club. On 14 October 2020, Fong left the club after his club's withdrawal from the HKPL in the new season.

=== Pegasus ===
On 10 November 2020, Fong returned to Pegasus after two seasons.

== International career ==
In December 2009, Fong was selected as a member of the Hong Kong national football team at just 16 years of age.

Fong is also a member of the Hong Kong national under-20 football team. He scored a goal in the 2012 Guangdong-Hong Kong Youth Cup but the team lost the first leg 1–2.

On 23 February 2012, Fong was named in the final 21 men Hong Kong squad by Ernie Merrick to face Chinese Taipei in a friendly on 29 February. Hong Kong went on to defeat Chinese Taipei 5–1 at Mong Kok Stadium and Merrick used the friendly to give an opportunity to Chan Man Fai and Fong, the two youngest players in the squad. "With more international exposure, they will only get better," he said.

As of 29 February 2012

#	Date	Venue	Opponent	Result	Scored	Competition
1	29 February 2012	Mong Kok Stadium, Hong Kong	Chinese Taipei	5–1	0	Friendly

== Honours ==
=== Club ===
Lee Man

- Hong Kong Sapling Cup: 2018–19

== Personal life ==
Fong Pak Lun is a student of La Salle College. He plays for the school football team. On 25 November 2011, he led the team to the Inter-school D1 title by scoring in the final.
