= Fan Qunxiao =

Chinese footballer

Personal information
- Full name: Fan Qunxiao
- Date of birth: 18 September 1987 (age 39)
- Place of birth: China
- Height: 1.87 m (6 ft 2 in)
- Position: Central defender

Team information
- Current team: Yunnan Kunlu
- Number: 25

Senior career*
Years	Team	Apps	(Gls)
2006	Shanghai United	0	(0)
2007–2010	Shanghai Shenhua	0	(0)
2007	→Shaanxi Neo-China (loan)	0	(0)
2008	→Shanghai Pudong (loan)	?	(?)
2011–2012	TSW Pegasus	1	(0)
2012	Guangdong Sunray Cave	2	(0)
2013	Chongqing F.C.	12	(0)
2014	Jiangxi Liansheng	4	(0)
2015–2018	Hainan Seamen	27	(0)
2019–	Yunnan Kunlu	8	(0)
- * Club domestic league appearances and goals as of 31 December 2020

Fan Qunxiao (Chinese: 樊群霄, born 18 September 1987) is a professional Chinese footballer who plays for Yunnan Kunlu in the China League Two.

== Club career ==
Fan Qunxiao would start his professional football career with top tier club Shanghai United in the 2006 Chinese Super League season. In 2007 Shanghai United would merge with another top tier club in Shanghai Shenhua, which saw Shenhua keep their name. In the following two years, Fan was being loaned out to Shaanxi Neo-China and Shanghai Pudong before briefly returning to Shanghai Shenhua in 2009, but he did not feature any matches.

After being unable to break into the Shenhua team Fan was close to joining Changchun Yatai in 2011 but instead on 1 September 2011, Hong Kong First Division League side TSW Pegasus announced that Fan joined the club. He was released by TSW Pegasus in January 2012. Fan returned to mainland China and signed a contract with China League One side Guangdong Sunray Cave in March 2012.

On 28 February 2019, Fan transferred to League Two side Yunnan Kunlu.

== Career statistics ==
Statistics accurate as of match played 31 December 2020.

Appearances and goals by club, season and competition
Club	Season	League			National Cup		League Cup		Continental		Total	
Club	Season	Division	Apps	Goals	Apps	Goals	Apps	Goals	Apps	Goals	Apps	Goals
Shanghai United	2006	Chinese Super League	0	0	0	0	-		-		0	0
Shanghai Shenhua	2009	Chinese Super League	0	0	-		-		-		0	0
Shanghai Shenhua	2010	Chinese Super League	0	0	-		-		-		0	0
Shanghai Shenhua	Total		0	0	0	0	0	0	0	0	0	0
Shaanxi Neo-China (loan)	2007	Chinese Super League	0	0	-		-		-		0	0
Shanghai Pudong (loan)	2008	China League One	1	0	-		-		-		1	0
TSW Pegasus	2011–12	Hong Kong First Division League	6	0	0	0	4 (Note: Appearances in Hong Kong Senior Challenge Shield)	0	-		10	0
Guangdong Sunray Cave	2012	China League One	2	0	1	2	-		-		3	2
Chongqing F.C.	2013	China League One	12	0	1	0	-		-		13	0
Jiangxi Liansheng	2014	China League Two	4	0	1	0	-		-		5	0
Hainan Seamen	2015	CAL	-		-		-		-		0	0
Hainan Seamen	2016	China League Two	8	0	0	0	-		-		8	0
Hainan Seamen	2017	China League Two	19	0	0	0	-		-		19	0
Hainan Seamen	2018	China League Two	0	0	0	0	-		-		0	0
Hainan Seamen	Total		27	0	0	0	0	0	0	0	27	0
Yunnan Kunlu	2019	China League Two	8	0	3	0	-		-		11	0
Yunnan Kunlu	2020	China League Two	0	0	-		-		-		0	0
Yunnan Kunlu	Total		8	0	3	0	0	0	0	0	11	0
Career total			60	0	6	2	4	0	0	0	70	2
