= Hisanori Takada =

Japanese footballer (1981–2022)

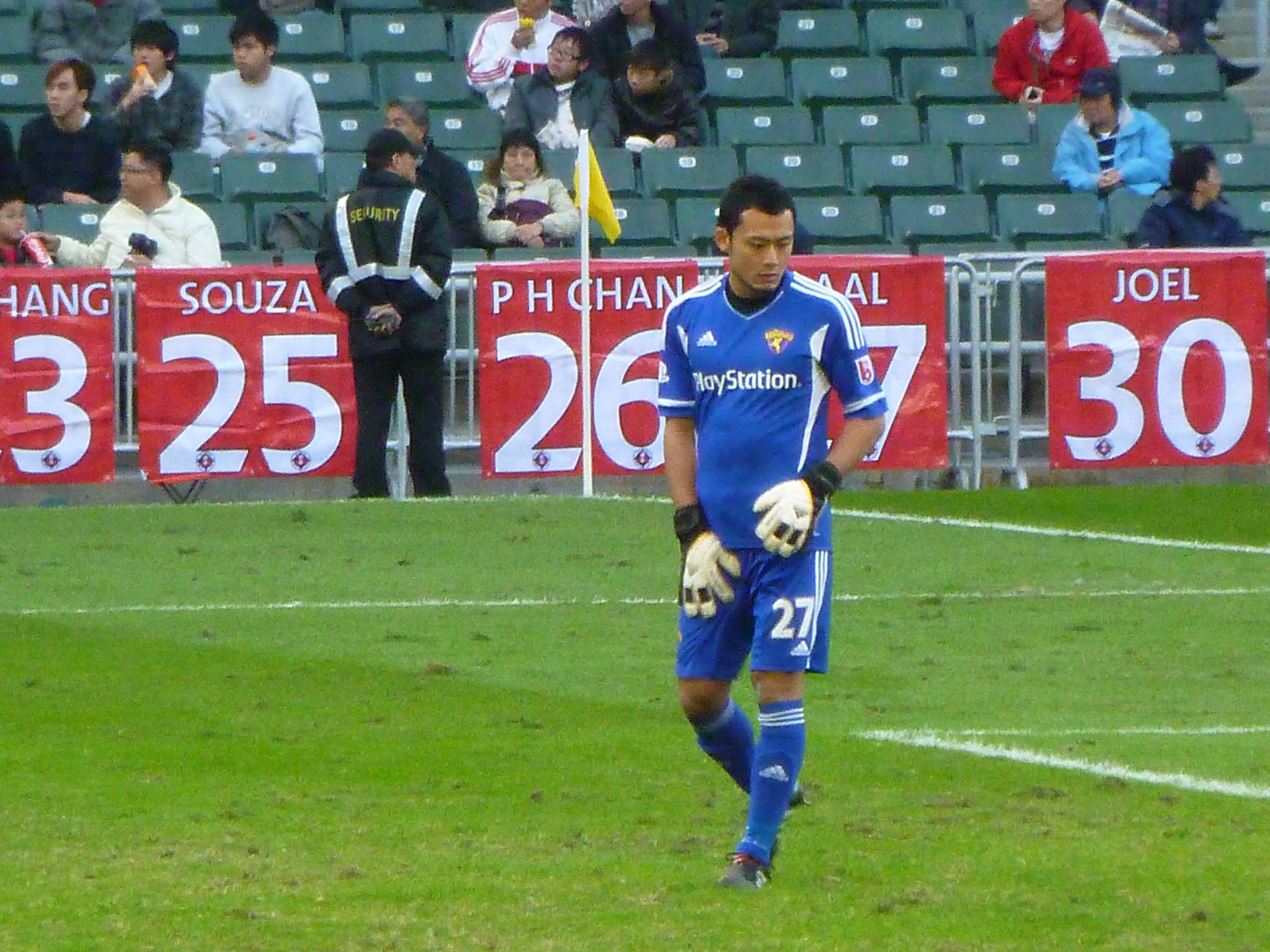
- Takada in 2011

Personal information
- Date of birth: 30 May 1981
- Place of birth: Kyoto, Japan
- Date of death: 17 March 2022 (aged 40)
- Place of death: Takayama, Gifu, Japan
- Height: 1.85 m (6 ft 1 in)
- Position: Goalkeeper

Youth career
- 2000–2002: Kyoto Sanga

Senior career*
Years	Team	Apps	(Gls)
2002–2003	Chester City	5	(0)
2003–2004	Drogheda United	5	(0)
2004–2006	FF Lillehammer	40	(0)
2006–2007	FSV Oggersheim	1	(0)
2007	Heidelberg United	0	(0)
2007–2008	Rangers (HKG)	2	(0)
2008–2009	Citizen	10	(0)
2010	Persitara North Jakarta	25	(0)
2011–2012	TSW Pegasus	14	(0)
Total		102	(0)
- * Club domestic league appearances and goals

Hisanori Takada (高田 寿典, Takada Hisanori; 30 May 1981 – 17 March 2022) was a Japanese professional footballer who played as a goalkeeper.

== Club career ==
Takada started his goalkeeper career in Japan, and made moves to England, Ireland, Norway, Germany, Australia, Hong Kong, and Indonesia across his playing career. With Drogheda United, he was the first Japanese player to play in the league. From Drogheda, he moved to FF Lillehammer, where he played 40 matches. He moved then to FSV Oggersheim. He ended his professional career in Hong Kong.

=== Hong Kong ===
Takada first moved to Hong Kong and signed for Hong Kong Rangers in 2007.

Takada played for Citizen during the 2008/2009 and 2009/2010 seasons. In 2009, he won the team's '2009 Hong Kong Football Club International Sevens Shield' Champion.

While in Hong Kong, Takada appeared in Hongkong Post's advertising campaign. He said it was a part-time job he found during the summer break.

=== Indonesia ===
In 2010, Takada played for Persitara in the Indonesia Super League before returning to Japan.

=== Pegasus and return to Hong Kong ===
Takada finished his three-month contract with Persitara and then became a free agent. He returned to Hong Kong to train with Citizen. He went to the 2010–11 Hong Kong Senior Challenge Shield final, then uploaded a match video to YouTube and told people that he was looking for a club on Facebook. In the end, he joined Pegasus in the summer of 2011.

== Personal life ==
After retiring from football, Takada moved to Nagano.

Takada died of a fall from Mount Hotakadake, (2,859 m) in Takayama City, Gifu Prefecture while on a backcountry skiing trip. At the time of his death, Takada was described as an "office worker".
