= Makhosonke Bhengu =

South African footballer (born 1983)

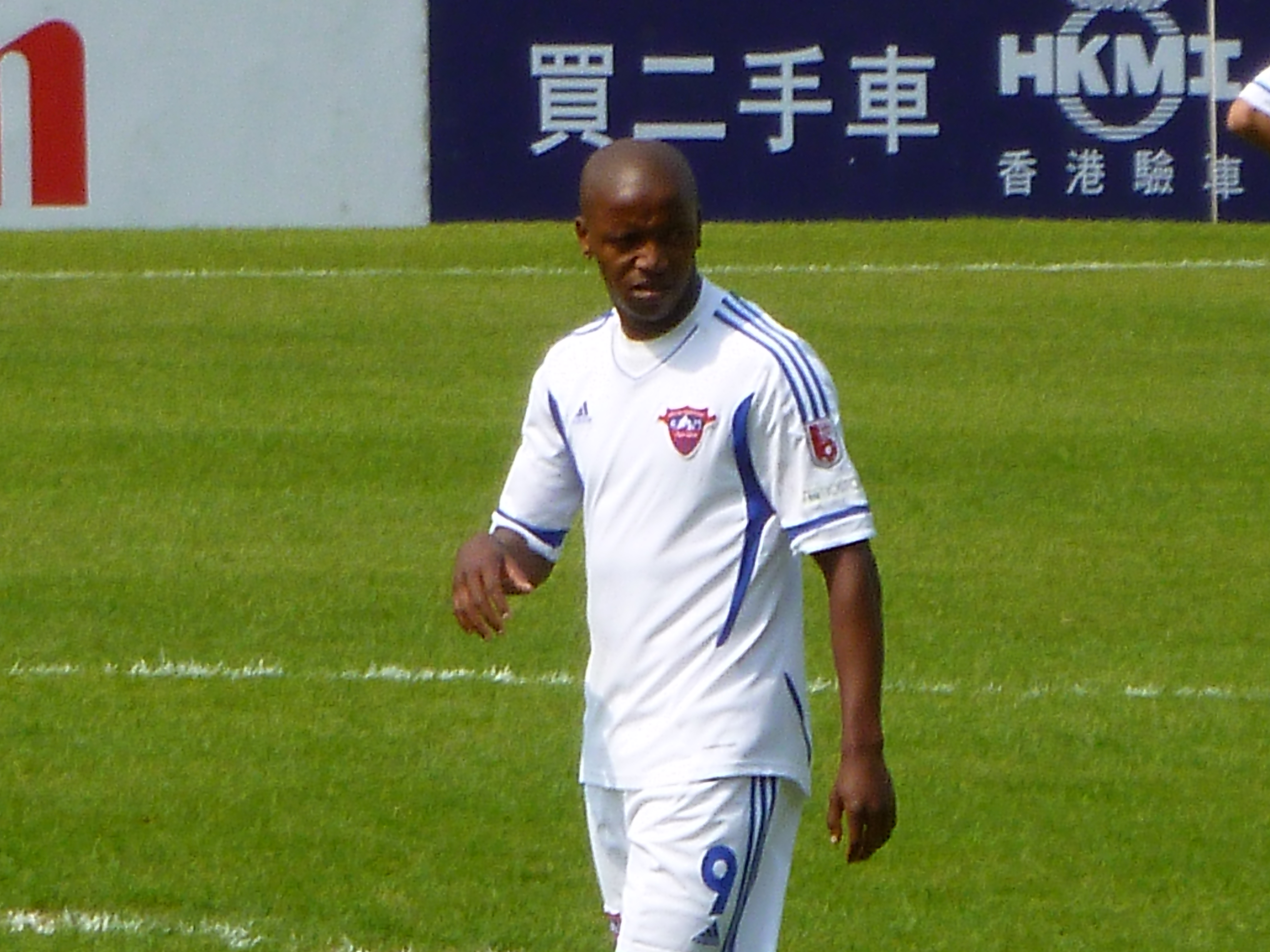

Personal information
- Full name: Makhosonke Erol Bhengu
- Date of birth: 21 November 1983 (age 42)
- Place of birth: Durban, South Africa
- Position: Forward

Youth career
- 2001–2002: Orlando Pirates

Senior career*
Years	Team	Apps	(Gls)
2002–2006	Orlando Pirates	6	(1)
2005–2006	→ Bloemfontein Celtic (loan)	16	(2)
2006–2007	Bidvest Wits	0	(0)
2009–2011	Fourway Rangers	19	(14)
2011–2012	Tuen Mun	14	(4)
2012	Sun Hei SC	5	(0)
2013	AmaZulu F.C.	3	(1)
2013	Pattaya United	5	(1)

International career
	South Africa U-23	8	(1)
- * Club domestic league appearances and goals

Makhosonke Bhengu (born 21 November 1983) is a South African soccer player who last played for Pattaya United in the Thai Premier League.
