= 2012–13 South China AA season =

South China AA
2012–13 season
- Chairman: Steven Lo
- Head Coach: Liu Chun Fai
- Home ground: Hong Kong Stadium
- First Division: 1st
- Senior Shield: Semi-finals
- FA Cup: Semi-finals
- Top goalscorer: League: Itaparica (11); All: Itaparica (13)
- Highest home attendance: 4,249 (29 September vs Kitchee, First Division)
- Lowest home attendance: 1,137 (2 February 2013 vs Sun Pegasus, First Division)
- Average home league attendance: 2,155 (in all competitions)
Home colours	Away colours

South China AA will seek to win their first trophy for one season after Kitchee won the Hong Kong First Division League, the Hong Kong FA Cup and Hong Kong League Cup while Sunray Cave JC Sun Hei defeated them to win the Hong Kong Senior Challenge Shield last season. South China are competing in the First Division League, Senior Shield and FA Cup this season.

== Review ==
=== Pre-season ===
After an unsuccessful season coached by Slovak Ján Kocian, South China will like to take revenge from Kitchee, who claimed an historic treble as they won the First Division League, the League Cup and the FA Cup last season. Unlike the previous season, chairman Steven Lo did not say too much about the changes of the team. He even stopped writing blog articles after the team finished their last league game until 9 July 2012.

On 9 July 2012, chairman Steven Lo published his first blog articles for the new season. He published the new first team squad and the in-and-out player changes. He also appointed Liu Chun Fai as the new head coach, and allowed former assistant coaches Chan Chi Hong and Chan Ho Yin to leave the club. The team also started having training on the same day. However, public media are not allowed to go into the training court.

South China started having public training on 17 July 2012. Chairman Steven Lo announced that the team would go to Guangdong for training camp. The team started the training camp on 23 July 2012. However, there are no news about the team in training camp and the players did not say anything on the social networking website, until the team published a photo, showing the players watching a football match in Guangdong. Soon after, chairman Steven Lo wrote an article on his blog about the training camp. The team will play total of 6 matches with Guangdong Sunray Cave, which Hong Kong and former South China players Leung Chun Pong and Chan Siu Ki is playing in, during the training camp. By the day that Steven Lo published the blog article, the team had a great result as they won 3 matches and tied once.

While the team was having training camp in mainland China, chairman Steven Lo introduced a new player. defender Sean Tse joined the club from English Premier League club Manchester City for an undisclosed fee. Since he is holding a Hong Kong ID card, he will not be registered and counted as a foreign player.

They got their first win in recent 4 pre-season matches on 22 August 2012. Itaparica and Au Yeung Yiu Chung scored once while center defender Joel Bertoti Padilha netted twice, as the club defeated Sun Pegasus 4–0 at Tsing Yi Northeast park.

=== September ===
South China began the new season at their home ground Hong Kong Stadium, playing against J. League Division 2 club Yokohama F.C.'s satellite team Yokohama FC Hong Kong on 2 September 2012. Tsuyoshi Yoshitake scored for Yokohama FC Hong Kong at the beginning of the game, but goals from Dhiego de Souza Martins, Itaparica, Ticão and Lee Hong Lim secured the win for the club, although Lee Ka Ho of Yokohama FC Hong Kong scored at the very last minute. Just a week later, South China visited Sunray Cave JC Sun Hei at Mong Kok Stadium. Defender Lee Chi Ho and Brazilian forward Leandro Rodrigues goals was not enough to see off the defending champions of Hong Kong Senior Challenge Shield, as Mamadou Barry and Cheung Kwok Ming equalised the game for Sunray Cave JC Sun Hei. The match ended as a 2–2 tie.

They went back to their home against Citizen on 19 September 2012. Lee Chi Ho scored his second goal of the season but Festus Baise equalised 7 minutes later. Winning goal from Itaparica helped the team to win over 2–1. As they start playing the Senior Challenge Shield from the quarterfinals, they had a free weekend, having more time to prepare for the big match against Kitchee a week later at home. Having won the First Division League in the past 2 seasons, Kitchee had achieved a great result against South China in recent years. Both team struggled to make goalscoring chances in the first half, but the second half was totally a different game. Jonathan Carril's 6-yard strike should have opened the deadlock for Kitchee but his shot hit the bar. Dhiego de Souza Martins scored the winning goal for South China in the stoppage time, thanked a lovely cross from Jack Sealy. This goal also helped the team to climb at the top of the league table.

=== October ===
Head coach Liu Chun Fai made two changes to his starting XI for the visit of Wofoo Tai Po in a league match on 7 October 2012. Au Yeung Yiu Chung and Cheng Lai Hin made their first starts of the season. Lee Hong Lim scored two headers while Au Yeung Yiu Chung and Itaparica scored two goals and one goal respectively, which helped the team to stay at the top of the league for another week. This was also the second league clean sheet of the season.

Due to the FIFA international match period, South China did not feature any matches for two weeks. Moreover, a number of players was called up for the international friendly match between Hong Kong and Malaysia. Yapp Hung Fai, Lee Chi Ho, Bai He, Lee Hong Lim and Au Yeung Yiu Chung had played in the friendly match held at Mong Kok Stadium.

Back to the league after international match period, South China welcomed Southern, which was at the bottom of the league table before the match, at home. Southern had gained 2 points in last two matches, after going behind in both matches. Although South China dominated the possession and the attacks, they could not manage to score a goal due to the solid defence of Southern. The club dropped two points and dropped a place to second in the table.

South China ended October at the second place of the league table.

=== November ===
South China began November with an away match against Biu Chun Rangers at Mong Kok Stadium. Thank to goals from Mauro, Dhiego Martins and Chan Wai Ho respectively, they claimed the 3–1 victory on 4 November. Despite winning the match, South China remained at the second place, behind Kitchee. They reclaimed the first place with a tough win at home against Tuen Mun on 11 November, thank to Michael Luk's and Itaparica's goal.

South China faced rivalry club Kitchee in the Senior Challenge Shield at Hong Kong Stadium on 17 November. Midfielder Itaparica's late goal helped the team record an important victory, with Kitchee's defender Liu Quankun was sent off in the stoppage time of the second half. They soon played against each other again one week later on 25 November at Kitchee's home ground Tseung Kwan O Sports Ground. South China successfully kept a clean sheet and eliminated their rival by 1–0 in aggregate, reaching the semi-finals stage of the shield.

=== December ===
South China started the new month with a Senior Shield semi-finals 1st leg match against 2011 champions Citizen at home Hong Kong Stadium on 15 December 2013. They suffered their first defeat of the season as they lost 2–3 to Citizen. Mauro's goal in the first half help them take the lead into changing room. However, Man Pei Tak was sent off on the 67th minute and Citizen's Campion, Paulinho and Festus scored three goals in 11 minutes. Lee Wai Lim scored a goal in the stoppage time, making a narrower lead for them.

Back into the league, they faced Sun Pegasus at Yuen Long Stadium a week later on 22 December. Goals from Kwok Kin Pong, Cheng Lai Hin and Lee Wai Lim, all in the second half, helped secure the victory for them.

4 days later on 26 December, South China travelled to Mong Kok Stadium and faced Citizen for the FA Cup first round 1st leg match. An easy win by 2–0 thank to Dhiego Martins and Au Yeung Yiu Chung in the second half, as well as the second red card from Chiu Chun Kit.

=== January ===
South China travelled to Mong Kok Stadium and faced Citizen for the Senior Shield semi-finals 2nd leg, their first game in 2013. Although taking the advantage throughout the game, they failed to score and was eliminated by Citizen in aggregate.

A week later on 13 January, South China hosted Citizen at home Hong Kong Stadium for the FA Cup first round 2nd leg match. They scored five goals in the match, with Au Yeung Yiu Chung scoring twice and Alessandro Celin, Michael Luk and Mauro scoring once. They defeated Citizen by 5–1, conceding one goal from Sandro's penalty kick.

Back into the league, South China faced Wofoo Tai Po at Hong Kong Stadium on 18 January. More or less the same as last week, they defeated Wofoo Tai Po 5–1, securing themselves in the first place of the league table. A week later on 26 January, they overcame Biu Chun Rangers from 1 goals down and scored 6 goals later.

=== February ===
South China started a new month and hosted a league match against Sun Pegasus at Hong Kong Stadium on 2 February. Jaimes McKee converted a penalty kick on the 10th minute and leading South China for almost all the game. A controversial goal from Dhiego Martins in the stoppage time help South China avoid losing all three points.

Two weeks later on 17 February, South China faced Sunray Cave JC Sun Hei for the FA Cup quarter-finals 1st leg match at Hong Kong Stadium. Goals from Au Yeung Yiu Chung, Ticão and Itaparica helped secure a 3–1 victory for them.

== Key Events ==
- 12 June 2012: Hong Kong midfielder Leung Chun Pong joins China League One club Guangdong Sunray Cave F.C.
- 20 June 2012: Liu Chun Fai was appointed as the new head coach of South China. On the other hand, Chan Wai Ho and Joel signed a new contract for South China.
- 9 July 2012: Chairman Steven Lo announced Carlos Augusto, Leandro, Chan Cham Hei, Jack Sealy, Michael Luk, Tin Man Ho and Lee Hong Lim join the club in the new season, while Yeo Jee-Hoon, Xu Deshuai, Li Haiqiang, Chan Pak Hang, Giovane and Zhang Chunhui leave the club.
- 10 July 2012: Hong Kong forward Chan Siu Ki joins China League One club Guangdong Sunray Cave F.C.
- 9 August 2012: defender Sean Tse joins South China for an undisclosed fee from Manchester City. He will not be counted as a foreign player as he is holding the Hong Kong ID card and thus is a Hong Kong citizen.
- 27 September 2012: Chairman Steven Lo announced that Brazilian forward Mauro Rafael da Silva joins South China for an undisclosed fee from Esportivo.
- 18 December 2012: Two youngsters, Japanese Kouta Jige and Brazilian Filipe de Souza Conceicao, signed professional contracts with the club. They are also promoted to the first team. Since they are holding the Hong Kong ID cards, they are counted as local player.
- 26 December 2012: Chairman Steven Lo announced that Chinese-Hongkonger Bai He joins fellow First Division team Sun Pegasus on loan until the end of season.
- 29 December 2012: Brazilian free agent striker Alessandro Celin joins the club.
- 10 January 2013: South China made a play exchange deal with Biu Chun Rangers. Wong Chin Hung joins Biu Chun Rangers from South China while Chak Ting Fung is transferred to South China. Both transfers are free transfers.
- 20 January 2013: Irish forward Adam Tse joins South China for an undisclosed fee. Similar to his brother Sean Tse, since he is holding the Hong Kong ID card, he will not be counted as a foreign player and thus is a Hong Kong citizen.
- 1 February 2013: Brazilian forward Mauro Rafael da Silva is released by the club by mutual reasons.
- 16 March 2013: Taiwanese-Spanish defender Victor Chou was reported that he was having a trial with the club.
- 29 March 2013: Taiwanese-Spanish defender Victor Chou joins South China as a free transfer.
- 19 April 2013: South China claim the First Division League title for the first time in three seasons thank to Kitchee's draw against Sun Pegasus with two matchdays left.

== Players ==
=== First team ===
As of 30 March 2013.

Note: Flags indicate national team as defined under FIFA eligibility rules; some limited exceptions apply. Players may hold more than one non-FIFA nationality.

No.	Pos.	Nation	Player
1	GK	HKG	Yapp Hung Fai
2	DF	HKG	Lee Chi Ho (captain)
3	DF	HKG	Chan Cham Hei
4	DF	HKG	Sean Tse
5	DF	HKG	Chak Ting Fung
8	MF	BRA	Ticão^{FP}
9	MF	HKG	Lee Wai Lim
10	FW	HKG	Au Yeung Yiu Chung
11	MF	BRA	Itaparica^{FP}
12	MF	HKG	Man Pei Tak
13	DF	TAI	Victor Chou^{FP}
15	DF	HKG	Chan Wai Ho (1st vice-captain)
16	FW	BRA	Alessandro Celin^{FP}

No.	Pos.	Nation	Player
17	MF	HKG	Lee Hong Lim
18	MF	HKG	Kwok Kin Pong
19	FW	BRA	Dhiego Martins^{FP}
20	FW	IRL	Adam Tse
22	DF	HKG	Jack Sealy
23	MF	CAN	Michael Luk
25	GK	HKG	Tin Man Ho
27	FW	BRA	Filipe de Souza Conceicao
30	DF	BRA	Joel Bertoti Padilha^{FP} (2nd vice-captain)
31	FW	HKG	Cheng Lai Hin
32	GK	HKG	Fan Chun Yip
36	MF	JPN	Kouta Jige

Remarks:
^{FP} These players are registered as foreign players.

==== Out on Loan ====
Note: Flags indicate national team as defined under FIFA eligibility rules; some limited exceptions apply. Players may hold more than one non-FIFA nationality.

No.	Pos.	Nation	Player
5	MF	HKG	Bai He (at Sun Pegasus until the end of the 2012–13 season)

Player with dual nationality

- (Republic of Ireland) (Hong Kong) Sean Tse (Local player)
- (Canada) Michael Luk (Local player, eligible to play for Hong Kong national football team)
- (Hong Kong) (England) Jack Sealy (Local player)
- (China) Bai He (Local player, eligible to play for Hong Kong national football team)
- (Japan) (Hong Kong) Kouta Jige (Local player)
- (Brazil) (Hong Kong) Filipe de Souza Conceicao (Local player)
- (Brazil) (Italy) Alessandro Celin

=== Transfers ===
==== In ====
Squad #	Position	Player	Transferred from	Fee	Date	Team	Source
20	DF	(Hong Kong) Lau Nim Yat	TSW Pegasus	Loan Return		First Team	
33	DF	(Hong Kong) Ng Wai Chiu	TSW Pegasus	Loan Return		First Team	
	DF	(Hong Kong) Cheung Chun Hei	Hong Kong Sapling	Loan Return		First Team	
	MF	(Hong Kong) Kot Cho Wai	Hong Kong Sapling	Loan Return		First Team	
	FW	(Hong Kong) Li Yim Lam	Hong Kong Sapling	Loan Return		First Team	
25	FW	(Hong Kong) Tin Man Ho	Wan Chai SA	Loan Return		First Team	
22	DF	(Hong Kong) (England) Jack Sealy	Sunray Cave JC Sun Hei		25 May 2012	First Team	
3	DF	(Hong Kong) Chan Cham Hei	Biu Chun Rangers		25 May 2012	First Team	
23	MF	(Hong Kong) (Canada) Michael Luk	Sunray Cave JC Sun Hei		25 May 2012	First Team	
17	MF	(Hong Kong) Lee Hong Lim	TSW Pegasus		28 May 2012	First Team	
11	MF	(Brazil) Itaparica	TSW Pegasus		20 June 2012	First Team	
8	MF	(Brazil) Carlos Augusto Bertoldi	Olympiacos Volos		9 July 2012	First Team	
21	FW	(Brazil) Leandro Rodrigues	Iraty		9 July 2012	First Team	
4	DF	(Hong Kong) Sean Tse	Manchester City	Free transfer	9 August 2012	First Team	
33	FW	(Brazil) Mauro Rafael da Silva	Esportivo	Undisclosed	27 September 2012	First Team	
27	FW	(Brazil) (Hong Kong) Filipe de Souza Conceicao	Youth team	N/A	18 December 2012	First Team	
36	MF	(Japan) (Hong Kong) Kouta Jige	Youth team	N/A	18 December 2012	First Team	
16	FW	(Brazil) Alessandro Celin	Free agent	Free transfer	29 December 2012	First Team	
5	DF	(Hong Kong) Chak Ting Fung	Biu Chun Rangers	Free transfer	9 January 2013	First Team	
20	FW	(Republic of Ireland) (Hong Kong) Adam Tse			20 January 2013	First Team	
13	DF	(Taiwan) Victor Chou	Free agent	Free transfer	29 March 2013	First Team	

==== Out ====
Squad #	Position	Player	Transferred to	Fee	Date	Source
20	DF	(Hong Kong) Lau Nim Yat	Biu Chun Rangers	Free transfer	5 June 2012	
16	MF	(Hong Kong) Leung Chun Pong	Guangdong Sunray Cave	Free transfer	12 June 2012	
3	DF	(South Korea) Yeo Jee-Hoon	Unattached (Released)		9 July 2012	
8	MF	(Hong Kong) Xu Deshuai	Sun Pegasus	Free transfer (Released)	9 July 2012	
11	MF	(Hong Kong) Li Haiqiang	Tuen Mun	Free transfer (Released)	9 July 2012	
22	FW	(Brazil) Giovane Alves da Silva	Biu Chun Rangers	Free transfer (Released)	9 July 2012	
23	GK	(Hong Kong) Zhang Chunhui	Sunray Cave JC Sun Hei	Free transfer (Released)	9 July 2012	
26	MF	(Hong Kong) Chan Pak Hang	Sun Pegasus	Free transfer (Released)	9 July 2012	
7	FW	(Hong Kong) Chan Siu Ki	Guangdong Sunray Cave	Free transfer (Released)	10 July 2012	
	MF	(Hong Kong) Kot Cho Wai	Sunray Cave JC Sun Hei	undisclosed	16 July 2012	
6	DF	(Hong Kong) Wong Chin Hung	Biu Chun Rangers	Free transfer	9 January 2013	
33	FW	(Brazil) Mauro Rafael da Silva	Unattached (Released)	Free transfer	1 February 2013	

==== Loan out ====
#	Position	Player	Loaned to	Date	Loan expires	Team	Source
5	MF	(Hong Kong) Bai He	(Hong Kong) Sun Pegasus	26 December 2012	End of the season	First team	

== Stats ==
=== Overall Stats ===
	First Division	Senior Shield	FA Cup	Total Stats
Games played	18	4	6	28
Games won	11	1	4	16
Games drawn	3	2	1	6
Games lost	4	1	1	6
Goals for	46	3	14	63
Goals against	21	3	4	28
Players used	26	20	24	28^{1}
Yellow cards	36	14	11	61
Red cards	6	2	0	8

Last updated: 4 May 2013

Players Used: South China has used a total of 27 different players in all competitions.

=== Squad Stats ===
				Total				Hong Kong First Division League		Senior Challenge Shield		FA Cup		
N	Pos.	Name	Nat.	GS	App	Gls	Min	App	Gls	App	Gls	App	Gls	Notes
1	GK	Yapp Hung Fai	(Hong Kong)	26	26	-25	2337	17	-18	4	-3	5	-4	(−) GA
25	GK	Tin Man Ho	(Hong Kong)	2	3	-3	183	2	-3			1		(−) GA
32	GK	Fan Chun Yip	(Hong Kong)											(−) GA
2	RB	Lee Chi Ho	(Hong Kong)	27	27	2	2429	18	2	4		5		
3	LB	Chan Cham Hei	(Hong Kong)	2	3		170	1		1		1		
4	CB	Sean Tse	(Hong Kong)	12	17	1	1106	12		2		3	1	
5	LB	Chak Ting Fung	(Hong Kong)	5	8		454	6				2		
13	RB	Victor Chou	(Taiwan)		1		29	1						
15	CB	Chan Wai Ho	(Hong Kong)	14	18	1	1240	11	1	2		5		
18	LB	Kwok Kin Pong	(Hong Kong)	26	26	1	2326	17	1	3		6		
22	RB	Jack Sealy	(Hong Kong)	18	21		1585	12		4		5		
30	CB	Joel Bertoti Padilha	(Brazil)	10	11		815	5		4		2		
	LB	Wong Chin Hung	(Hong Kong)	1	1		70			1				left in January 2013
8	DM	Ticão	(Brazil)	25	23	3	1992	16	2	3		4	1	
9	RM	Lee Wai Lim	(Hong Kong)	15	22	4	1461	15	3	4	1	3		
10	AM	Au Yeung Yiu Chung	(Hong Kong)	15	19	9	1272	12	5	2		5	4	
11	AM	Itaparica	(Brazil)	22	24	13	1834	17	11	4	1	3	1	
12	DM	Man Pei Tak	(Hong Kong)	11	15		984	8		3		4		
17	RM	Lee Hong Lim	(Hong Kong)	22	24	7	2023	16	6	4		4	1	
23	LM	Michael Luk	(Hong Kong)	15	20	3	1222	12	2	3		5	1	
36	CM	Kouta Jige	(Japan)		3		40					3		
	DM	Bai He	(Hong Kong)	1	5		265	4		1				on loan to Sun Pegasus in January 2013
16	FW	Alessandro Celin	(Brazil)	9	14	4	884	9	3			5	1	joined in January 2013
19	FW	Dhiego de Souza Martins	(Brazil)	14	18	7	1152	13	6	1		4	1	
20	FW	Adam Tse	(Republic of Ireland)	1	5		166	4				1		joined in January 2013
27	FW	Filipe de Souza Conceicao	(Brazil)		2		23	1				1		
31	FW	Cheng Lai Hin	(Hong Kong)	6	17	3	629	11	1	2		4	2	
	FW	Leandro Rodrigues	(Brazil)	4	4	1	320	4	1					left in September 2012
	FW	Mauro Rafael da Silva	(Brazil)	8	11	3	636	5	1	4	1	2	1	joined in September 2012, left in February 2013

Last updated: 4 May 2013
Ordered by Position
0 shown as blank

=== Top scorers ===
As of 4 May 2013

Place	Position	Nationality	Number	Name	First Division League	Senior Challenge Shield	FA Cup	Total
1	MF	(Brazil)	11	Itaparica	11	1	1	13
2	MF	(Hong Kong)	10	Au Yeung Yiu Chung	5	0	4	9
=3	MF	(Hong Kong)	17	Lee Hong Lim	6	0	1	7
=3	FW	(Brazil)	19	Dhiego de Souza Martins	6	0	1	7
=5	MF	(Hong Kong)	9	Lee Wai Lim	3	1	0	4
=5	FW	(Brazil)	16	Alessandro Celin	3	0	1	4
=7	MF	(Brazil)	8	Ticão	2	0	1	3
=7	MF	(Hong Kong)	23	Luk Chi Ho	2	0	1	3
=7	FW	(Hong Kong)	31	Cheng Lai Hin	1	0	2	3
=7	FW	(Brazil)		Mauro Rafael da Silva	1	1	1	3
11	DF	(Hong Kong)	2	Lee Chi Ho	2	0	0	2
=12	DF	(Hong Kong)	4	Sean Tse	0	0	1	1
=12	DF	(Hong Kong)	15	Chan Wai Ho	1	0	0	1
=12	DF	(Hong Kong)	18	Kwok Kin Pong	1	0	0	1
=12	FW	(Brazil)		Leandro Rodrigues	1	0	0	1
Own goal					1	0	0	1
TOTAL					46	3	14	63

=== Disciplinary record ===
As of 4 May 2013

Number	Nationality	Position	Name	First Division League		Senior Challenge Shield		FA Cup		Total	
Number	Nationality	Position	Name	Booked	Sent off (straight red)	Booked	Sent off (straight red)	Booked	Sent off (straight red)	Booked	Sent off (straight red)
1	(Hong Kong)	GK	Yapp Hung Fai	1	0	1	0	1	0	3	0
2	(Hong Kong)	DF	Lee Chi Ho	2	1	1	0	0	0	3	1
4	(Hong Kong)	DF	Sean Tse	4	1	1	0	0	0	5	1
5	(Hong Kong)	DF	Chak Ting Fung	1	0	0	0	1	0	2	0
8	(Hong Kong)	MF	Ticão	5	2	1	0	1	0	7	2
9	(Hong Kong)	MF	Lee Wai Lim	1	0	0	0	0	0	1	0
10	(Hong Kong)	MF	Au Yeung Yiu Chung	1	0	0	0	0	0	1	0
11	(Brazil)	MF	Itaparica	1	0	2	0	0	0	3	0
12	(Hong Kong)	MF	Man Pei Tak	0	1	2	1	1	0	3	2
15	(Hong Kong)	DF	Chan Wai Ho	2	0	0	0	0	0	2	0
16	(Brazil)	FW	Alessandro Celin	2	0	0	0	0	0	2	0
17	(Hong Kong)	MF	Lee Hong Lim	1	0	0	0	0	0	1	0
18	(Hong Kong)	MF	Kwok Kin Pong	3	0	2	0	2	0	7	0
19	(Brazil)	FW	Dhiego de Souza Martins	0	1	1	0	2	0	3	1
22	(Hong Kong) (England)	DF	Jack Sealy	2	0	0	1	0	0	2	1
23	(Hong Kong) (Canada)	MF	Michael Luk	2	0	0	0	0	0	2	0
30	(Brazil)	DF	Joel Bertoti Padilha	2	0	1	0	2	0	5	0
31	(Hong Kong)	FW	Cheng Lai Hin	3	0	0	0	1	0	4	0
33	(Brazil)	FW	Mauro Rafael da Silva	1	0	2	0	0	0	3	0
	(Brazil)	FW	Leandro Rodrigues	1	0	0	0	0	0	1	0
	(China) (Hong Kong)	MF	Bai He	1	0	0	0	0	0	1	0
TOTALS				36	6	14	2	11	0	61	8

=== Captains ===
No.	P	Name	Country	No. games	Notes
2	DF	Lee Chi Ho	(Hong Kong)	26	Club captain
15	DF	Chan Wai Ho	(Hong Kong)	2	Club vice captain

Last updated: 4 May 2013
Source: Competitive match reports.
Competitive matches only
Matches started as captain only
Country: FIFA nationality; No.: Squad number; P: Position; Name: Player name; No. Games: Number of games started as captain.

== Competitions ==
=== Overall ===
Competition	Started round	Final position / round	First match	Last match
Hong Kong First Division League	—	Winner	2 September 2012	4 May 2013
Senior Challenge Shield	Quarter-finals	Semi-finals	17 November 2012	5 January 2013
FA Cup	1st round	Semi-finals	26 December 2012	28 April 2013

Updated to match played 4 May 2013
Source: Competitions

=== First Division League ===
==== Classification ====
Pos	Team	Pld	W	D	L	GF	GA	GD	Pts	Qualification or relegation
1	South China (C)	18	11	3	4	46	21	+25	36	2014 AFC Champions League play-off stage
2	Kitchee	18	9	5	4	39	23	+16	32	2014 AFC Cup (Note: Kitchee won the 2012–13 Hong Kong Season play-off and thus qualified for the 2014 AFC Cup Group stage.)
3	Tuen Mun	18	8	4	6	29	31	−2	28	2012–13 Hong Kong Season play-off (Note: Southern qualified for the play-offs as Kitchee defeated Sun Pegasus in the FA Cup while they have guaranteed a place for the play-offs, meaning the league 4th place qualifies.)
4	Southern	18	6	6	6	24	27	−3	24	2012–13 Hong Kong Season play-off
5	Sun Pegasus	18	4	9	5	35	29	+6	21	

Updated to match(es) played on 26 May 2013. Source:
Rules for classification: 1) points; 2) head-to-head points; 3) head-to-head goal difference; 4) head-to-head goals scored; 5) goal difference; 6) number of goals scored.
(C) Champions

==== Results summary ====
Overall								Home						Away					
Pld	W	D	L	GF	GA	GD	Pts	W	D	L	GF	GA	GD	W	D	L	GF	GA	GD
18	11	3	4	46	21	+25	36	6	2	1	25	11	+14	5	1	3	21	10	+11

Last updated: 4 May 2013.

==== Results by round ====
Round	1	2	3	4	5	6	7	8	9	10	11	12	13	14	15	16	17	18
Ground	H	A	H	H	A	H	A	H	A	H	H	H	A	A	A	A	A	H
Result	W	D	W	W	W	D	W	W	W	W	W	D	W	L	L	W	L	L
Position	1	3	2	1	1	2	2	1	1	1	1	1	1	1	1	1	1	1

Updated to match(es) played on 4 May 2013. Source: HKFA First Division Fixture 2012/2013
A = Away; H = Home; W = Win; D = Draw; L = Loss

== Matches ==
Win Draw Loss Void

=== Pre-season ===
Guangdong Nike Team (China)	2 – 13	(Hong Kong) South China	Guangdong, China
Goal		Goal	Stadium: Guangdong Olympic Sports Center

Panyu Pearl (China)	1 – 5	(Hong Kong) South China	Guangdong, China
Goal		Goal	Stadium: Guangdong Olympic Sports Center

Dongguan Nancheng (China)	2 – 3	(Hong Kong) South China	Guangdong, China
Goal		Goal	Stadium: Guangdong Olympic Sports Center

1 August 2012	Guangdong Sunray Cave (China)	1 – 1	(Hong Kong) South China	Guangdong, China
15:00 (GMT+8)	Goal		Lee Wai Lim	Stadium: Guangdong Olympic Sports Center

2 August 2012	Guangzhou R&F (China)	2 – 2	(Hong Kong) South China	Guangdong, China
	Goal		Goal	Stadium: Baining Football Training Base

14 August 2012	South China (Hong Kong)	0 – 1	(Hong Kong) Wofoo Tai Po	So Kon Po, Hong Kong Island, Hong Kong
			Goal	Stadium: So Kon Po Recreation Ground

22 August 2012	South China (Hong Kong)	4 – 0	(Hong Kong) Sun Pegasus	Tsing Yi, New Territories, Hong Kong
	Itaparica; Joel; Au Yeung Yiu Chung			Stadium: Tsing Yi Northeast Park

=== Competitive ===
==== First Division League ====
2 September 2012 Week 1	South China	5 – 2	Yokohama FC Hong Kong	So Kon Po, Hong Kong Island
14:30 (GMT+8)	Dhiego 7'; Itaparica 17' (pen.), 62'; Ticão 32'; Lee Hong Lim 80'; Tse (yellow card) 85'	Report	4' Yoshitake; (yellow card) 16' Leung Kwun Chung; (yellow card) 61' Law Chun Bong; 90' Lee Ka Ho	Stadium: Hong Kong Stadium (Capatity:40,000); Attendance: 3,175; Referee: Tong Kui Sum; Assistant referees: Cheng Oi Cho, Lam Nai Kei; Fourth official: Amarjit Singh Sarao

9 September 2012 Week 2	Sunray Cave JC Sun Hei	2 – 2	South China	Mong Kok, Kowloon
17:30 (GMT+8)	Barry 15'; Diaz (yellow card) 29'; Leung Tsz Chun (yellow card) 32'; Cheung Kin Fung (yellow card) 37'; Cheung Kwok Ming 67'; Wong Chun Ho (yellow card) 83'	Report	6' Lee Chi Ho; (yellow card) 23' Sealy; (yellow card) 41' Kwok Kin Pong; 58' Leandro; (yellow card) 90' Cheng Lai Hin; (yellow card) 90' Yapp Hung Fai	Stadium: Mong Kok Stadium (Capatity:6,680); Attendance: 3,333; Referee: Cheng Oi Cho; Assistant referees: Lam Chi Ho, Poon Ming Fai; Fourth official: Ho Wai Sing

15 September 2012 Week 3	South China	2 – 1	Citizen	So Kon Po, Hong Kong Island
17:30 (GMT+8)	Lee Chi Ho (yellow card) 47' (goal) 52'; Itaparica 77'; Ticão (yellow card) 79'; Bai He (yellow card) 81'; Sealy (yellow card) 88'; Cheng Lai Hin (yellow card) 90'	Report	59' Festus; (yellow card) 81' So Loi Keung; (yellow card) 89' Paulinho	Stadium: Hong Kong Stadium (Capatity:40,000); Attendance: 2,005; Referee: Tong Kui Sum; Assistant referees: Ng Chiu Kok, Ho Wai Sing; Fourth official: Lam Shing Yan, Franky

29 September 2012 Week 4	South China	1 – 0	Kitchee	So Kon Po, Hong Kong Island
17:30 (GMT+8)	Leandro (yellow card) 5'; Ticão (yellow card) 45'; Dhiego Martins 90+8' (yellow card) 73' (yellow-red card) 90+8'; Tse (yellow card) 81'; Lee Wai Lim (yellow card) 90+9'	Report	(yellow card) 8' Lo Kwan Yee; (yellow card) 45' Chu Siu Kei; (yellow card) 90+1' Dani; (yellow card) 90+6' Lam Ka Wai	Stadium: Hong Kong Stadium (Capatity:40,000); Attendance: 4,249; Referee: Ng Chiu Kok; Assistant referees: Chow Chun Kit, Chung Ming Sang; Fourth official: Lam Shing Yan, Franky

7 October 2012 Week 5	Wofoo Tai Po	0 – 5	South China	Tai Po, New Territories
14:30 (GMT+8)	Aender (yellow card) 45'	Report	6', 54' Lee Hong Lim; 13' Itaparica; (yellow card) 14' Luk Chi Ho; (yellow card) 15' Kwok Kin Pong; (yellow card) 21' Ticão; 29', 72' Au Yeung Yiu Chung; (yellow card) 37' Cheng Lai Hin	Stadium: Tai Po Sports Ground (Capatity:3,000); Attendance: 1,723; Referee: Ng Kai Lam; Assistant referees: Lam Nai Kei, Yu Chun San; Fourth official: Chan Ming Siu

20 October 2012 Week 6	South China	0 – 0	Southern	So Kon Po, Hong Kong Island
17:30 (GMT+8)	Tse (yellow card) 33'	Report	(yellow card) 49' Ip Chung Long; (yellow card) 57' Carril; (yellow card) 74' Rubén; (yellow card) 90+4' Tsui Yiu Chung	Stadium: Hong Kong Stadium (Capatity:40,000); Attendance: 1,476; Referee: Tong Kui Sum; Assistant referees: Cheng Oi Cho, Poon Ming Fai; Fourth official: Lam Nai Kei

4 November 2012 Week 7	Biu Chun Rangers	1 – 3	South China	Mong Kok, Kowloon
14:30 (GMT+8)	Bamnjo 31' (yellow card) 33' (yellow-red card); Miroslav (yellow card) 86'	Report	9' Mauro; 36' Dhiego; 83' Chan Wai Ho	Stadium: Mong Kok Stadium (Capacity: 6,680); Attendance: 1,738; Referee: Cheng Oi Cho; Assistant referees: Lam Shing Yan, Yu Chun San; Fourth official: Ho Wai Sing

11 November 2012 Week 8	South China	2 – 1	Tuen Mun	So Kon Po, Hong Kong Island
14:30 (GMT+8)	Luk Chi Ho 34'; Ticão (yellow card) 43' (yellow-red card) 90'; Itaparica 62'; Mauro (yellow card) 81'; Lee Hong Lim (yellow card) 90'	Report	(yellow card) 16' Daniel; (yellow card) 44' Kwok Wing Sun; 45' (yellow card) 78' Mauricio; (yellow card) 83' Diego	Stadium: Hong Kong Stadium (Capatity:40,000); Attendance: 1,977; Referee: Tong Kui Sum; Assistant referees: Poon Ming Fai, Yu Chun San; Fourth official: Sarao, Amarjit Singh

22 December 2012 Week 9	Sun Pegasus	0 – 3	South China	Yuen Long, New Territories
17:30 (GMT+8)	Lo Chun Kit (yellow card) 28'; Ng Wai Chiu (yellow card) 31'; Ngan Lok Fung (yellow card) 50'; Thiago (yellow card) 73'	Report	(yellow card) 60' Ticão; 65' Kwok Kin Pong; 79' Cheng Lai Hin; 85' Lee Wai Lim; (yellow card) 90+1' Joel	Stadium: Yuen Long Stadium (Capatity:4,932); Attendance: 1,616; Referee: Ng Chiu Kok; Assistant referees: Ho Wai Sing, Chung Ming Sang; Fourth official: Lam Shing Yan

18 January 2013 Week 10	South China	5 – 1	Wofoo Tai Po	So Kon Po, Hong Kong Island
20:00 (GMT+8)	Lee Hong Lim 25'; Chak Ting Fung (yellow card) 27'; Itaparica 39' (pen.); Ticão (yellow card) 43' (goal) 65' (yellow card) 66' (red card); Joel (yellow card) 50'; Au Yeung Yiu Chung 58', 71' (yellow card) 59'	Report	(yellow card) 35' Lui Chi Hing; (yellow card) 58' Li Shu Yeung; 86' Alex	Stadium: Hong Kong Stadium (Capatity:40,000); Attendance: 1,269; Referee: Cheng Oi Cho; Assistant referees: Chan Shui Hung, Lam Nai Kei; Fourth official: Tong Kui Sum

26 January 2013 Week 12^{1}	South China	6 – 1	Biu Chun Rangers	Mong Kok, Kowloon
15:00 (GMT+8)	Lee Wai Lim 51', 90'; Celin 52'; Itaparica 64' (yellow card) 76'; Lee Hong Lim 70'; Au Yeung Yiu Chung 84'	Report	13' Lam Hok Hei; (yellow card) 59' Chan Siu Yuen	Stadium: Mong Kok Stadium (Capacity: 6,680); Attendance: 1,858; Referee: Tong Kui Sum; Assistant referees: Chan Shui Hung, Ho Wai Sing; Fourth official: Lam Nai Kei

2 February 2013 Week 11	South China	1 – 1	Sun Pegasus	So Kon Po, Hong Kong Island
17:30 (GMT+8)	Kwok Kin Pong (yellow card) 13'; Dhiego 90+1'	Report	(yellow card) 2' Deng Jinghuang; (yellow card) 2' Chan Pak Hang; (yellow card) 4' Tong Kin Man; 10' (pen.) McKee; (yellow card) 42' Bai He; (yellow card) 60' Xu Deshuai; (yellow card) 63' Lo Chun Kit; (yellow card) 90' Li Jian	Stadium: Hong Kong Stadium (Capatity:40,000); Attendance: 1,137; Referee: Liu Kwok Man; Assistant referees: Chow Chun Kit, Lam Shing Yan Franky; Fourth official: Lui Siu Chuen

3 March 2013 Week 13	Citizen	0 – 1	South China	Mong Kok, Kowloon
17:30 (GMT+8)	Hélio (yellow card) 90+3'	Report	36' Itaparica	Stadium: Mong Kok Stadium (Capatity:6,680); Attendance: 1,956; Referee: Tong Kui Sum; Assistant referees: Chow Chun Kit, Chung Ming Sang; Fourth official: Cheng Oi Cho

16 March 2013 Week 14	Tuen Mun	2 – 1	South China	Tuen Mun, New Territories
14:30 (GMT+8)	Ling Cong (yellow card) 16'; Beto (yellow card) 18'; Li Haiqiang (yellow card) 36' (yellow-red card) 80'; Daniel (yellow card) 61' (goal) 73' (red card) 83'; Yip Tsz Chun 63'; Diego (yellow card) 90+5'	Report	90+3' Luk Chi Ho	Stadium: Tuen Mun Tang Siu Kin Sports Ground (Capatity:2,200); Attendance: 1,311; Referee: Ng Kai Lam; Assistant referees: Chung Ming Sang, Lam Nai Kei; Fourth official: Cheng Oi Cho

30 March 2013 Week 15	Yokohama FC Hong Kong	0 – 0 (Abandoned^{3})	South China	Mong Kok, Kowloon
17:30 (GMT+8)	Lo Kong Wai (yellow card) 7'; Chan Siu Kwan (yellow card) 21'; Law Chun Bong (yellow card) 22'	Report		Stadium: Mong Kok Stadium^{2} (Capatity:6,680); Referee: Ng Chiu Kok; Assistant referees: Liu Kwok Man, Lam Chi Ho; Fourth official: Chow Chun Kit

4 April 2013 Week 15R^{4}	Yokohama FC Hong Kong	1 – 0	South China	Siu Sai Wan, Hong Kong Island
14:30 (GMT+8)	Yoshitake 13'; Chan Siu Kwan (yellow card) 42'; Mijanović (yellow card) 42'; Leung Kwun Chung (yellow card) 55'; Fukuda (yellow card) 83'	Report	(yellow card) 26' Ticão; (yellow card) 88' Luk Chi Ho; (yellow card) 90+1' Celin	Stadium: Siu Sai Wan Sports Ground (Capatity:12,000); Attendance: 946; Referee: Ho Wai Sing; Assistant referees: Chan Shui Hung, Poon Ming Fai; Fourth official: Lui Siu Chuen

14 April 2013 Week 16	Kitchee	1 – 4	South China	Tseung Kwan O, New Territories
17:30 (GMT+8)	Chan Man Fai (yellow card) 31'; Rehman (yellow card) 43'; Liu Quankun (yellow card) 84'; Huang Yang 89'; Wang Zhenpeng (red card) 90+4'	Report	(yellow card) 28' Tse; 40' (pen.) Itaparica; (yellow card) 52' Chan Wai Ho; 73' Celin; 81' Lee Hong Lim; 90+7' Dhiego Martins	Stadium: Tseung Kwan O Sports Ground (Capatity:5,000^{5}); Attendance: 3,613; Referee: Ng Chiu Kok; Assistant referees: Tong Kui Sum, Lam Chi Ho; Fourth official: Lam Nai Kei

20 April 2013 Week 17	Southern	3 – 2	South China	Aberdeen, Hong Kong Island
14:30 (GMT+8)	Chan Cheuk Kwong 41'; Rubén 60'; Chow Ka Wa 68'	Report	25' (o.g.) Chung Hon Chee; (yellow card) 35' (goal) 64' Celin; (yellow card) 50' (yellow-red card) 89' Lee Chi Ho; (yellow card) 72' Chan Wai Ho	Stadium: Aberdeen Sports Ground (Capatity:4,000^{6}); Attendance: 1,058; Referee: Tong Kui Sum; Assistant referees: Lam Nai Kei, Yau Ho Fai Leo; Fourth official: Ng Kai Lam

4 May 2013 Week 18	South China	3 – 4	Sunray Cave JC Sun Hei	So Kon Po, Hong Kong Island
15:30 (GMT+8)	Itaparica 8', 35'; Man Pei Tak (yellow card) 31' (yellow-red card) 79'; Dhiego 44'; Tse (yellow card) 45' (yellow-red card) 54'; Lee Chi Ho (yellow card) 90'	Report	(yellow card) 7' Diaz; (yellow card) 12' Kilima; 31' (pen.) Roberto; 43' (yellow card) 48' Choi Kwok Wai; (yellow card) 45+1' (goal) 89'Barry; (red card) 52' Yeung Chi Lun; 80' James Ha	Stadium: Hong Kong Stadium (Capatity:40,000); Attendance: 2,254; Referee: Ng Chiu Kok; Assistant referees: Lui Siu Chuen, Poon Ming Fai; Fourth official: Chan Ming Siu

Remarks:
^{1} South China's home matches against Biu Chun Rangers was rescheduled and were played at Mong Kok Stadium instead of their usual home ground Hong Kong Stadium.
^{2} South China's away match against Yokohama FC Hong Kong was played at Mong Kok Stadium instead of Siu Sai Wan Sports Ground.
^{3} The match was abandoned after 28 minutes due to adverse weather and bad pitch conditions.
^{4} The replay of week 15 match against Yokohama FC Hong Kong was scheduled to be played at Siu Sai Wan Sports Ground on 4 April 2013.
^{5} Since the 3,500-seated main stand was all full, the 1,500 temporary stand was opened and therefore the capacity of Tseung Kwan O Sports Ground was 5,000 in the home match against South China. ^{6} The capacity of Aberdeen Sports Ground is originally 9,000, but only the 4,000-seated main stand is opened for football match.

==== Senior Challenge Shield ====
===== Quarter-finals =====
17 November 2012 1st leg	South China	1 – 0	Kitchee	So Kon Po, Hong Kong Island
17:30(GMT+8)	Man Pei Tak (yellow card) 6'; Lee Chi Ho (yellow card) 54'; Itaparica 87'	Report	(yellow card) 12' Spitz; (yellow card) 26' Chan Man Fai; (yellow card) 32' (yellow-red card) 90+3' Liu Quankun; (yellow card) 68' Jordi Tarrés; (yellow card) 78' Recio; (yellow card) 81' Cheng Siu Wai	Stadium: Hong Kong Stadium (Capacity: 40,000); Attendance: 2,757; Referee: Cheng Oi Cho; Assistant referees: Chung Ming Sang, Poon Ming Fai; Fourth official: Tong Kui Sum

25 November 2012 2nd leg	Kitchee	0 – 0 (0 – 1 agg.)	South China	Tseung Kwan O, New Territories
17:30(GMT+8)	Lo Kwan Yee (yellow card) 17'; Cheng Siu Wai (yellow card) 63'	Report	(yellow card) 25' Mauro; (yellow card) 41' Kwok Kin Pong; (yellow card) 85' Itaparica; (yellow card) 90+4' Yapp Hung Fai	Stadium: Tseung Kwan O Sports Ground (Capacity: 3,500); Attendance: 1,782; Referee: Liu Kwok Man; Assistant referees: Chan Shui Hung, Lam Nai Kei; Fourth official: Ho Wai Sing

===== Semi-finals =====
15 December 2012 1st leg	South China	2 – 3	Citizen	So Kon Po, Hong Kong Island
15:00(GMT+8)	Joel (yellow card) 20'; Mauro 21'; Man Pei Tak (yellow card) 61' (red card) 67'; Lee Wai Lim 90+3'; Sealy (red card) 90+4'	Report	(yellow card) 1' (goal) 75' Festus; (yellow card) 32' Tam Lok Hin; (yellow card) 44' Sham Kwok Keung; 64' (pen.) Campion; 70' Paulinho; (yellow card) 90' Henry	Stadium: Hong Kong Stadium (Capacity: 40,000); Attendance: 1,782; Referee: Ng Chiu Kok; Assistant referees: Chow Chun Kit, Lam Chi Ho; Fourth official: Lam Shing Yan, Franky

5 January 2013 2nd leg	Citizen	0 – 0 (3 – 2 agg.)	South China	Mong Kok, Kowloon
14:30(GMT+8)	Yuan Yeng (yellow card) 38'; So Loi Keung (yellow card) 45+2'; Sham Kwok Fai (yellow card) 58'; Chan Hin Kwong (yellow card) 66'; Paulinho (yellow card) 90+6'	Report	(yellow card) 49' Mauro; (yellow card) 72' Tse; (yellow card) 75' Itaparica; (yellow card) 76' Dhiego; (yellow card) 78' Kwok Kin Pong; (yellow card) 86' Ticão	Stadium: Mong Kok Stadium (Capacity: 6,680); Attendance: 3,220; Referee: Liu Kwok Man; Assistant referees: Chow Chun Kit, Ho Wai Sing; Fourth official: Lam Chi Ho

==== FA Cup ====
===== First round =====
26 December 2012 1st leg	Citizen	0 – 2	South China	Mong Kok, Kowloon
14:30 (GMT+8)	Chiu Chun Kit (yellow card) 12' (yellow-red card) 77'; Paulinho (yellow card) 45+2'; Hélio (yellow card) 66'; Campion (yellow card) 67'; Wong Yiu Fu (yellow card) 87'	Report	(yellow card) 6' Joel; (yellow card) 45+2' Yapp Hung Fai; (yellow card) 51' (goal) 56' Dhiego; 81' Au Yeung Yiu Chung	Stadium: Mong Kok Stadium (Capacity: 6,680); Attendance: 2,292; Referee: Ng Kai Lam; Assistant referees: Ho Wai Sing, Chung Ming Sang; Fourth official: Chan Ming Siu

13 January 2013 2nd leg	South China	5 – 1 (7 – 1 agg.)	Citizen	So Kon Po, Hong Kong Island
14:30 (GMT+8)	Au Yeung Yiu Chung 17', 45'; Celin 48'; Luk Chi Ho 77'; Kwok Kin Pong (yellow card) 83'; Mauro 90+1'	Report	(yellow card) 47' Henry; 72' (pen.) Sandro	Stadium: Hong Kong Stadium (Capacity: 40,000); Attendance: 1,902; Referee: Tong Kui Sum; Assistant referees: Lam Chi Ho, Poon Ming Fai; Fourth official: Cheng Oi Cho

===== Quarter-finals =====
17 February 2013 1st leg	South China	3 – 0	Sunray Cave JC Sun Hei	So Kon Po, Hong Kong Island
17:30(GMT+8)	Au Yeung Yiu Chung 73'; Chak Ting Fung (yellow card) 78'; Ticão 89'; Itaparica 90'	Report	(yellow card) 35' Díaz; (yellow card) 48' Kilama	Stadium: Hong Kong Stadium (Capacity: 40,000); Attendance: 1,329; Referee: Cheng Oi Cho; Assistant referees: Lam Chi Ho, Poon Ming Fai; Fourth official: Luk Kin Sun

9 March 2013 2nd leg	Sunray Cave JC Sun Hei	0 – 3 (0 – 6 agg.)	South China	Mong Kok, Kowloon
17:30(GMT+8)	Wong Chun Ho (yellow card) 8'	Report	5' Tse; 85' Lee Hong Lim; 90+1' Cheng Lai Hin	Stadium: Mong Kok Stadium (Capacity: 6,680); Attendance: 1,406; Referee: Tong Kui Sum; Assistant referees: Cheng Oi Cho, Lam Chi Ho; Fourth official: Tang Hing Fu

===== Semi-finals =====
7 April 2012 1st leg	Kitchee	1 – 1	South China	Tseung Kwan O, New Territories
18:00(GMT+8)	Liu Quankun (yellow card) 47'; Huang Yang 55'; Dani (yellow card) 61'; Matt Lam (yellow card) 75'; Lo Kwan Yee (yellow card) 90'	Report	12' Cheng Lai Hin; (yellow card) 54' Man Pei Tak; (yellow card) 79' Kwok Kin Pong	Stadium: Tseung Kwan O Sports Ground (Capacity: 3,500); Attendance: 1,627; Referee: Tong Kui Sum; Assistant referees: Chan Shui Hung, Lui Siu Chuen; Fourth official: Luk Kin Sun

28 April 2013 2nd leg	South China	0 – 2 (1 – 3 agg.)	Kitchee	So Kon Po, Hong Kong Island
18:00(GMT+8)	Ticão (yellow card) 16'; Cheng Lai Hin (yellow card) 38'; Joel (yellow card) 75'; Dhiego (yellow card) 79'	Report	(yellow card) 23' Huang Yang; (yellow card) 49' Lam Ka Wai; 73', 76' Yago; (yellow card) 79' Rehman	Stadium: Hong Kong Stadium (Capacity: 40,000); Attendance: 3,005; Referee: Liu Kwok Man; Assistant referees: Lam Chi Ho, Poon Ming Fai; Fourth official: Lui Siu Chuen
