= 2015–16 South China AA season =

South China
2015–16 season
- Chairman: Wallace Cheung
- Head Coach: Casemiro Mior
- Home Ground: Tseung Kwan O Sports Ground (Capacity: 3,500)
- Premier League: 8th
- Senior Shield: TBC
- FA Cup: TBC
Home colours	Away colours

The 2015–16 season is South China's 95th season in the top-tier division in Hong Kong football. South China will compete in the Premier League, Senior Challenge Shield and FA Cup in this season.

== Key events ==
- 31 May 2015: The club released Kwok Kin Pong, Law Chun Bong, Lee Wai Lim, Evan Kostopoulos, Daniel McBreen, Michael Campion, Detinho and Cheng Lai Hin.
- 9 June 2015: Hong Kong striker Chan Man Fai joins the club from Sun Pegasus on a free transfer.
- 10 June 2015: Hong Kong defender Cheung Chi Yung joins the club from I-Sky Yuen Long on a free transfer.
- 16 June 2015: Hong Kong defender Cheung Kin Fung joins the club from Kitchee on a free transfer.
- 24 June 2015: Hong Kong Liang Zicheng joins the club from Eastern for an undisclosed fee.
- 30 June 2015: Australian striker Boima Karpeh joins the club from Sporting Goa for an undisclosed fee.
- 1 July 2015: Brazilian striker Lucas Espíndola da Silva joins the club from SC Gaúcho for an undisclosed fee.
- 2 July 2015: Hong Kong midfielder Lai Yiu Cheong joins the club from Wong Tai Sin on a free transfer.
- 19 July 2015: Hong Kong defender Moses Mensah joins the club from Yokohama FC Hong Kong on a free transfer.
- 22 July 2015: Brazilian midfielder Luiz Carlos Vieira joins the club from Club Deportivo San José for an undisclosed fee.
- 25 July 2015: Defender Andy Russell, goalkeeper Tsang Man Fai and striker Yuto Nakamura join fellow Hong Kong Premier League club Wong Tai Sin on loan until the end of the season.

== Players ==
=== Squad information ===
N	P	Nat.	Name	Date of birth	Age	Since	Previous club	Notes
1	GK	(Hong Kong)	Leung Hing Kit^{LP}	22 October 1989	24	2014 (Winter)	(Hong Kong) Biu Chun Rangers	On loan from Biu Chun Rangers
2	DF	(Hong Kong)	Jack Sealy^{LP}	4 May 1987	27	2012	(Hong Kong) Sunray Cave JC Sun Hei	Second nationality: England
4	DF	(Hong Kong)	Sean Tse^{LP}	3 May 1992	22	2012	(England) Manchester City	Second nationality: Hong Kong
5	DF	(Hong Kong)	Chak Ting Fung^{LP}	27 November 1989	24	2013 (Winter)	(Hong Kong) Biu Chun Rangers	
6	DF	(Hong Kong)	Andy Russell^{NR}	21 November 1987	27	2014	(England) AFC Fylde	Second nationality: England
7	FW	(Hong Kong)	Chan Siu Ki^{LP}	14 July 1985	28	2014 (Winter)	(China) Guangdong Sunray Cave	
8	MF	(Cameroon)	Mahama Awal^{FP}	10 June 1991	24	2015 (Winter)	(China) Guangdong Sunray Cave	
9	FW	(Brazil)	Lucas Espíndola da Silva^{FP}	6 May 1990	25	2015	(Brazil) SC Gaúcho	
10	MF	(Brazil)	Luiz Carlos Vieira^{FP}	27 July 1982	33	2015	(Bolivia) San José	
11	MF	(Hong Kong)	Itaparica^{LP}	8 July 1980	35	2014	(Hong Kong) Eastern Salon	
12	GK	(Ecuador)	Cristian Mora^{FP}	26 August 1979	36	2014	(Ecuador) Deportivo Cuenca	
13	DF	(Hong Kong)	Cheung Kin Fung^{LP}	1 January 1984	31	2015	(Hong Kong) Kitchee	
14	FW	(Japan)	Yuto Nakamura^{NR}	23 January 1987	28	2014	(Hong Kong) Citizen	On loan to Wong Tai Sin
15	DF	(Hong Kong)	Chan Wai Ho^{LP}	24 April 1982	32	2011 (Winter)	(Hong Kong) Fourway Rangers	Team captain
16	MF	(Hong Kong)	Chan Siu Kwan^{LP}	1 August 1992	21	2013	Yokohama FC Hong Kong	
17	MF	(Hong Kong)	Leung Chun Pong^{LP}	1 October 1986	27	2014 (Winter)	(China) Gunagdong Sunray Cave	
19	FW	(Hong Kong)	Chan Man Fai^{LP}	19 June 1988	27	2015	(Hong Kong) Sun Pegasus	
20	MF	(Hong Kong)	Lau Cheuk Hin^{LP}	26 April 1992	23	2015 (Winter)	Yokohama FC Hong Kong	
21	MF	(Hong Kong)	Law Hiu Chung^{LP}	10 June 1995	20	2015 (Winter)	(Hong Kong) Biu Chun Rangers	
22	DF	(Serbia)	Bojan Mališić^{FP}	14 January 1985	30	2014	(Ukraine) Hoverla	
23	DF	(Hong Kong)	Che Runqiu^{LP}	25 October 1990	24	2014	(Hong Kong) Royal Southern	
25	GK	(Hong Kong)	Tin Man Ho^{LP}	5 March 1990	24	2012	(Hong Kong) Wanchai	From Youth system
27	MF	(Hong Kong)	Lai Yiu Cheong^{LP}	25 September 1988	26	2015	(Hong Kong) Wong Tai Sin	
28	MF	(Hong Kong)	Liang Zicheng^{LP}	18 March 1982	33	2015	(Hong Kong) Eastern	
29	DF	(Hong Kong)	Moses Mensah^{LP}	10 August 1978	37	2015	Yokohama FC Hong Kong	
33	GK	(Hong Kong)	Tsang Man Fai^{NR}	2 August 1991	22	2013	Yokohama FC Hong Kong	On loan to Wong Tai Sin
36	MF	(Hong Kong)	Kouta Jige^{LP}	23 April 1997	17	2011	Youth system	Second nationality: Japan
38	FW	(Australia)	Boima Karpeh^{FP}	16 June 1984	31	2015	(India) Sporting Goa	
76	DF	(Hong Kong)	Cheung Chi Yung^{LP}	30 June 1989	26	2015	(Hong Kong) I-Sky Yuen Long	
90	FW	(Hong Kong)	Lam Hok Hei^{LP}	18 September 1991	23	2015 (Winter)	(Hong Kong) Biu Chun Rangers	
	MF	(Hong Kong)	Law Chun Yan^{LP}	21 June 1994	20	2013	Youth system	
	DF	(Hong Kong)	Kwok Yat Him^{LP}	18 January 1994	20	2014	Youth system	

Last update: 26 July 2015
Source: South China Football Team
Ordered by squad number.
^{LP}Local player; ^{FP}Foreign player; ^{NR}Non-registered player

== Transfers ==
=== In ===
==== Summer ====
No.	Pos	Player	Transferred From	Fee	Date	Source
19	FW	(Hong Kong) Chan Man Fai	(Hong Kong) Sun Pegasus	Free transfer	9 June 2015	
76	DF	(Hong Kong) Cheung Chi Yung	(Hong Kong) I-Sky Yuen Long	Free transfer	10 June 2015	
28	MF	(Hong Kong) Liang Zicheng	(Hong Kong) Eastern	Undisclosed	24 June 2015	
38	FW	(Australia) Boima Karpeh	(India) Sporting Goa	Undisclosed	30 June 2015	
9	FW	(Brazil) Lucas Espíndola da Silva	(Brazil) SC Gaúcho	Undisclosed	1 July 2015	
27	MF	(Hong Kong) Lai Yiu Cheong	(Hong Kong) Wong Tai Sin	Free transfer	2 July 2015	
29	DF	(Hong Kong) Moses Mensah	Yokohama FC Hong Kong	Free transfer	19 July 2015	
10	MF	(Brazil) Luiz Carlos Vieira	(Bolivia) San José	Undisclosed	22 July 2015	

=== Out ===
==== Summer ====
No.	Pos	Player	Transferred To	Fee	Date	Source
3	MF	(Hong Kong) Michael Campion	Unattached	Free transfer	31 May 2015	
9	MF	(Hong Kong) Lee Wai Lim	Retired	N/A	31 May 2015	
18	DF	(Hong Kong) Kwok Kin Pong	(Hong Kong) Pegasus	Free transfer	31 May 2015	
19	FW	(Australia) Evan Kostopoulos	(Australia) Adelaide Comets	Free transfer	31 May 2015	
24	MF	(Hong Kong) Lo Kong Wai	(Hong Kong) YFCMD	Loan return	31 May 2015	
30	FW	(Hong Kong) Detinho	(Hong Kong) Wing Yee	Free transfer	31 May 2015	
31	FW	(Hong Kong) Cheng Lai Hin	(Hong Kong) Pegasus	Free transfer	31 May 2015	
38	FW	(Australia) Daniel McBreen	Unattached	Free transfer	31 May 2015	
99	DF	(Hong Kong) Li Ngai Hoi	(Hong Kong) Kitchee	Loan return	31 May 2015	

=== Loan In ===
==== Summer ====
No.	Pos	Player	Loaned From	Start	End	Source

=== Loan Out ===
==== Summer ====
No.	Pos	Player	Loaned To	Start	End	Source
6	DF	(Hong Kong) Andy Russell	(Hong Kong) Wong Tai Sin	25 July 2015	End of season	
14	FW	(Japan) Yuto Nakamura	(Hong Kong) Wong Tai Sin	25 July 2015	End of season	
33	GK	(Hong Kong) Tsang Man Fai	(Hong Kong) Wong Tai Sin	25 July 2015	End of season	

== Club ==
=== Coaching staff ===
Position	Staff
Head Coach	(Brazil) Casemiro Mior
Assistant Coach	(Brazil) Marcelo Cardoso
Assistant Coach	(Hong Kong) Ku Kam Fai
Assistant Coach	(Hong Kong) Gary Li
Goalkeeper Coach	(Hong Kong) Chu Kwok Kuen

Last updated: 26 July 2015
Source: South China AA

== Squad statistics ==
=== Overall Stats ===
	League	Senior Shield	FA Cup	League Cup	2015 AFC Cup	Total Stats
Games played	0	0	0	0	0	0
Games won	0	0	0	0	0	0
Games drawn	0	0	0	0	0	0
Games lost	0	0	0	0	0	0
Goals for	0	0	0	0	0	0
Goals against	0	0	0	0	0	0
Players used	0	0	0	0	0	0
Yellow cards	0	0	0	0	0	0
Red cards	0	0	0	0	0	0

Last updated: 25 July 2015
Source: Player Stats

=== Appearances and goals ===
Key

No. = Squad number

Pos. = Playing position

Nat. = Nationality

Apps = Appearances

GK = Goalkeeper

DF = Defender

MF = Midfielder

FW = Forward

Numbers in parentheses denote appearances as substitute. Players with number struck through and marked † left the club during the playing season.

As of 25 July 2015

No.	Pos.	Nat.	Name	Premier League		Senior Shield		FA Cup		League Cup		AFC Cup		Total	
No.	Pos.	Nat.	Name	Apps	Goals	Apps	Goals	Apps	Goals	Apps	Goals	Apps	Goals	Apps	Goals
1	GK	HKG	Leung Hing Kit	0	0	0	0	0	0	0	0	0	0	0	0
2	DF	HKG	Jack Sealy	0	0	0	0	0	0	0	0	0	0	0	0
4	DF	HKG	Sean Tse	0	0	0	0	0	0	0	0	0	0	0	0
5	DF	HKG	Chak Ting Fung	0	0	0	0	0	0	0	0	0	0	0	0
6	DF	HKG	Andy Russell	0	0	0	0	0	0	0	0	0	0	0	0
7	FW	HKG	Chan Siu Ki	0	0	0	0	0	0	0	0	0	0	0	0
8	MF	CMR	Mahama Awal	0	0	0	0	0	0	0	0	0	0	0	0
9	FW	BRA	Lucas Espíndola da Silva	0	0	0	0	0	0	0	0	0	0	0	0
10	MF	BRA	Luiz Carlos Vieira	0	0	0	0	0	0	0	0	0	0	0	0
11	MF	HKG	Itaparica	0	0	0	0	0	0	0	0	0	0	0	0
12	GK	ECU	Cristian Mora	0	0	0	0	0	0	0	0	0	0	0	0
13	DF	HKG	Cheung Kin Fung	0	0	0	0	0	0	0	0	0	0	0	0
15	DF	HKG	Chan Wai Ho	0	0	0	0	0	0	0	0	0	0	0	0
16	MF	HKG	Chan Siu Kwan	0	0	0	0	0	0	0	0	0	0	0	0
17	MF	HKG	Leung Chun Pong	0	0	0	0	0	0	0	0	0	0	0	0
19	FW	HKG	Chan Man Fai	0	0	0	0	0	0	0	0	0	0	0	0
20	MF	HKG	Lau Cheuk Hin	0	0	0	0	0	0	0	0	0	0	0	0
21	MF	HKG	Law Hiu Chung	0	0	0	0	0	0	0	0	0	0	0	0
22	DF	SER	Bojan Mališić	0	0	0	0	0	0	0	0	0	0	0	0
23	DF	HKG	Che Runqiu	0	0	0	0	0	0	0	0	0	0	0	0
25	GK	HKG	Tin Man Ho	0	0	0	0	0	0	0	0	0	0	0	0
27	MF	HKG	Lai Yiu Cheong	0	0	0	0	0	0	0	0	0	0	0	0
28	MF	HKG	Liang Zicheng	0	0	0	0	0	0	0	0	0	0	0	0
29	DF	HKG	Moses Mensah	0	0	0	0	0	0	0	0	0	0	0	0
33	GK	HKG	Tsang Man Fai	0	0	0	0	0	0	0	0	0	0	0	0
36	MF	HKG	Kouta Jige	0	0	0	0	0	0	0	0	0	0	0	0
76	DF	HKG	Cheung Chi Yung	0	0	0	0	0	0	0	0	0	0	0	0
90	FW	HKG	Lam Hok Hei	0	0	0	0	0	0	0	0	0	0	0	0

=== Top scorers ===
Last updated: 25 July 2015.
Source: Hong Kong Football Association

The list is sorted by shirt number when total goals are equal.

Rnk	Pos	No.	Player	Premier League	Senior Shield	FA Cup	Total
Own goals							
TOTALS							

=== Disciplinary record ===
Includes all competitive matches.Players listed below made at least one appearance for Southern first squad during the season.

N	P	Nat.	Name	League			Shield			FA Cup			Others			Total			Notes
N	P	Nat.	Name	Yellow card	Second yellow card	Red card	Yellow card	Second yellow card	Red card	Yellow card	Second yellow card	Red card	Yellow card	Second yellow card	Red card	Yellow card	Second yellow card	Red card	Notes

Last updated: 25 July 2015
Source: Competitive matches
Ordered by (red card) , (second yellow card) and (yellow card)
(yellow card) = Number of bookings; (second yellow card) = Number of sending offs after a second yellow card; (red card) = Number of sending offs by a direct red card.

=== Substitution Record ===
Includes all competitive matches.

			League		Shield		FA Cup		Others		Total	
No.	Pos	Name	subson	subsoff	subson	subsoff	subson	subsoff	subson	subsoff	subson	subsoff
Goalkeepers
1	GK	Leung Hing Kit	0	0	0	0	0	0	0	0	0	0
12	GK	Cristian Mora	0	0	0	0	0	0	0	0	0	0
25	GK	Tin Man Ho	0	0	0	0	0	0	0	0	0	0
33	GK	Tsang Man Fai	0	0	0	0	0	0	0	0	0	0
Defenders
2	RB	Jack Sealy	0	0	0	0	0	0	0	0	0	0
4	CB	Sean Tse	0	0	0	0	0	0	0	0	0	0
5	LB	Chak Ting Fung	0	0	0	0	0	0	0	0	0	0
6	CB	Andy Russell	0	0	0	0	0	0	0	0	0	0
13	LB	Cheung Kin Fung	0	0	0	0	0	0	0	0	0	0
15	CB	Chan Wai Ho	0	0	0	0	0	0	0	0	0	0
22	CB	Bojan Mališić	0	0	0	0	0	0	0	0	0	0
23	RB	Che Runqiu	0	0	0	0	0	0	0	0	0	0
29	LB	Moses Mensah	0	0	0	0	0	0	0	0	0	0
76	CB	Cheung Chi Yung	0	0	0	0	0	0	0	0	0	0
Midfielders
8	RM	Mahama Awal	0	0	0	0	0	0	0	0	0	0
10	AM	Luiz Carlos Vieira	0	0	0	0	0	0	0	0	0	0
11	AM	Itaparica	0	0	0	0	0	0	0	0	0	0
16	DM	Chan Siu Kwan	0	0	0	0	0	0	0	0	0	0
17	CM	Leung Chun Pong	0	0	0	0	0	0	0	0	0	0
20	CM	Lau Cheuk Hin	0	0	0	0	0	0	0	0	0	0
21	RM	Law Hiu Chung	0	0	0	0	0	0	0	0	0	0
27	RM	Lai Yiu Cheong	0	0	0	0	0	0	0	0	0	0
28	RM	Liang Zicheng	0	0	0	0	0	0	0	0	0	0
36	RM	Kouta Jige	0	0	0	0	0	0	0	0	0	0
Forwards
7	CF	Chan Siu Ki	0	0	0	0	0	0	0	0	0	0
9	CF	Lucas Espíndola da Silva	0	0	0	0	0	0	0	0	0	0
19	CF	Chan Man Fai	0	0	0	0	0	0	0	0	0	0
90	CF	Lam Hok Hei	0	0	0	0	0	0	0	0	0	0

Last updated: 25 July 2015

=== Captains ===
No.	P	Name	Country	No. games	Notes

Last updated: 25 July 2015
Source: Competitive match reports.
Competitive matches only
Matches started as captain only
Country: FIFA nationality; No.: Squad number; P: Position; Name: Player name; No. Games: Number of games started as captain.

== Competitions ==
=== Overall ===
Competition	Started round	Current position / round	Final position / round	First match	Last match
Hong Kong Premier League	—	4th		12 September 2015	
Senior Shield	—	—			
FA Cup	—	—			

Updated to match played 25 July 2015
Source: Competitions

=== Premier League ===
==== Classification ====
Pos	Team	Pld	W	D	L	GF	GA	GD	Pts	Qualification or relegation
1	Eastern	16	12	2	2	35	13	+22	38	Qualification to Champions League group stage
2	Kitchee	16	11	4	1	32	11	+21	37	Qualification to season play-off and Champions League preliminary round 2
3	South China	16	9	2	5	26	21	+5	29	Qualification to season play-off (Note: Since the winners of the Senior Shield, Eastern, and the winners of the League Cup, Kitchee, qualified for AFC competitions and the Season Play-off respectively based on league position, the spots awarded to the Senior Shield winner and the League Cup winner for the Season Play-off were awarded to the third and fourth placed team in the league. Pegasus qualified as winners of the FA Cup.)
4	Southern	16	6	5	5	26	21	+5	23	Qualification to season play-off
5	Pegasus	16	4	5	7	22	27	−5	17	Qualification to season play-off

Source: Hong Kong Football Association
Rules for classification: 1) Points; 2) Head-to-head points; 3) Head-to-head goal difference; 4) Head-to-head goals scored; 5) Goal difference; 6) Goals scored; 7) Fair-play points; 8) Drawing lots (Play-off if the winner has to be decided)

==== Results summary ====
Overall								Home						Away					
Pld	W	D	L	GF	GA	GD	Pts	W	D	L	GF	GA	GD	W	D	L	GF	GA	GD
0	0	0	0	0	0	0	0	0	0	0	0	0	0	0	0	0	0	0	0

Last updated: 25 July 2015.
Source: Premier League

== Matches ==
Win Draw Loss Void

=== Pre-season friendlies ===
21 July 2015	South China (Hong Kong)	6–0	Hong Kong U18	Diamond Hill, Kowloon
18:00 (UTC+8)	Boima 16'; Lucas 47', 85'; Awal 68', 73'; Lau Cheuk Hin 71'			Stadium: Po Kong Village Road Park

25 July 2015	South China (Hong Kong)	5–1	Hong Kong U18	Tin Shui Wai, New Territories
16:15 (UTC+8)	Lam Hok Hei 10' (53); Andy Russell 71'; Itaparica 73'; Awal 85'		Cheung Wai Sing 5'	Stadium: Tin Yip Road Park
