= Marco Balthazar =

Brazilian footballer

Personal information
- Full name: Marco António Burigo Balthazar
- Date of birth: 14 May 1983 (age 43)
- Place of birth: Porto Alegre, Brazil
- Height: 1.81 m (5 ft 11 in)
- Position: Attacking midfielder

Team information
- Current team: Cruzeiro-RS

Senior career*
Years	Team	Apps	(Gls)
2002–2005	RS Futebol Clube		
2004–2005	→ Servette (loan)	2	(2)
2006–2009	Lausanne	83	(15)
2010–2011	Caxias	2	(0)
2011–	Cruzeiro-RS		
- * Club domestic league appearances and goals

Marco António Burigo Balthazar (born 14 May 1983) is a Brazilian footballer who plays as an attacking midfielder for Esporte Clube Cruzeiro.

He also holds an Italian passport.

== Career ==
Born in Porto Alegre, Rio Grande do Sul, Balthazar signed a 5-year contract with RS Futebol Clube in January 2002. He scored 12 goals in Campeonato Gaúcho Segunda Divisão in 2004, as team top-scorer. In September 2004 he was loaned to Swiss Super League club Servette.

After a short spell back to Brazil, he was signed by Lausanne in February 2006, along with Mauro. He was released by Lausanne at the end of the 2009 season.

In May 2010 he signed a 1-year contract with Caxias, rejoining former teammate Mauro and Marcos Rogério. He played twice in 2010 Campeonato Brasileiro Série C and also played at 2010 Copa FGF.
