= Adam Tse =

English football player

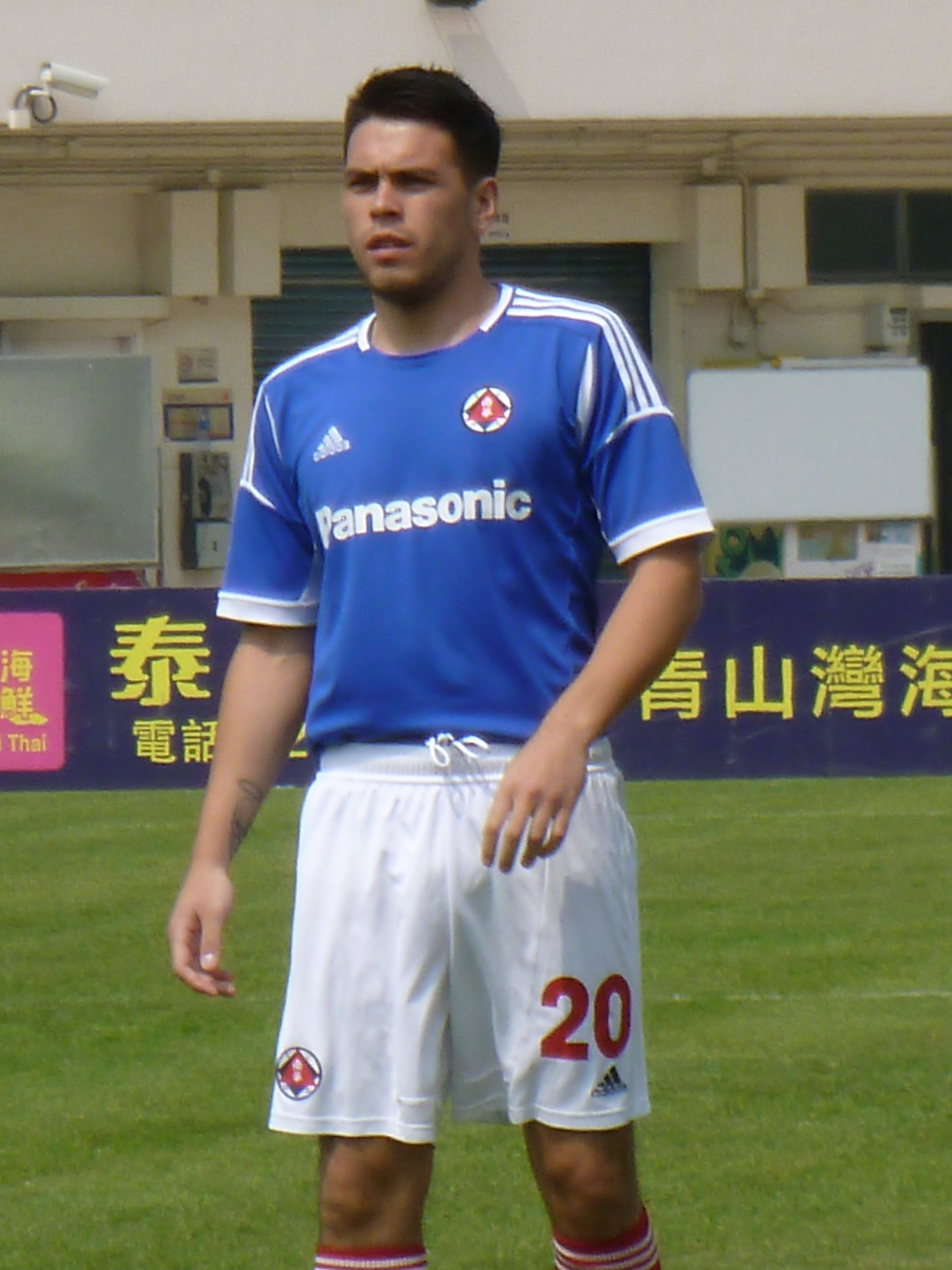
- Adam Tse training with South China before the First Division match against Tuen Mun on 16 March 2013

Personal information
- Full name: English: Adam Chi Keung Tse; Traditional Chinese: 謝志強
- Date of birth: June 22, 1990 (age 36)
- Place of birth: Salford, England
- Height: 1.79 m (5 ft 10 in)
- Position: Forward

Senior career*
Years	Team	Apps	(Gls)
- Clifton
- Lighoaks Villa
2013	South China	4	(0)
- * Club domestic league appearances and goals as of 1 June 2013

Adam Chi Keung Tse (Traditional Chinese: 謝志強, born 22 June 1990) is an English footballer who last played for Hong Kong First Division League club South China. His position is a striker.

He has a younger brother, Sean Tse, who also plays for Hong Kong club South China.

== Early life ==
Tse was born in City of Salford, Greater Manchester, to a Hong Kongese father and an English mother with Irish heritage in 1990. Two years later, his younger brother Sean Tse was born.

== Club career ==
=== Non-league clubs in Manchester ===
Unlike his brother Sean, Adam did not join any professional clubs' youth academy. Instead, he played for non-league teams in Manchester. He played for Clifton F.C. and Lighoaks Villa F.C.

=== South China ===
His brother Sean was released by Manchester City in May 2012 and joined Hong Kong First Division League side South China in August 2012. Following his brother, Adam joined South China in January 2013 after a successful 2-week trial. On 2 February 2013, he made his debut for South China as a 69-minute substitute against Sun Pegasus. During the stoppage time, Adam fouled on Sun Pegasus' goalkeeper when the goalkeeper came out from the goalie and claimed the ball but referee insisted game playing on. This led to Dhiego Martins goal as well as a 1–1 draw.

== International career ==
Similar to Sean, Adam is eligible for Republic of Ireland through his maternal grand-parentage. His brother, Sean Tse, has joined the Hong Kong national football team and captained the team in the 2022 EAFF E-1 Football Championship.

== Career stats ==
=== Club ===
As of 4 May 2013

Appearances and goals by club, season and competition
Club	Season	League			Shield & FA Cup		League Cup		AFC Cup		Others		Total	
Club	Season	Division	Apps	Goals	Apps	Goals	Apps	Goals	Apps	Goals	Apps	Goals	Apps	Goals
South China	2012–13	First Division	4	0	1	0	—	—	N/A	N/A	N/A	N/A	5	0
Total			4	0	1	0	0	0	0	0	0	0	5	0

== Honours ==
=== Club ===
South China

- Hong Kong First Division (1): 2012–13
