= Marcos Rogério =

Marco Rogério may refer to:

- Marcos Rogério (politician) (born 1978), Brazilian politician
- Marcos Rogério (footballer) (born 1985), Brazilian footballer
