= Filipe de Souza Conceição =

Brazilian footballer (born 1995)

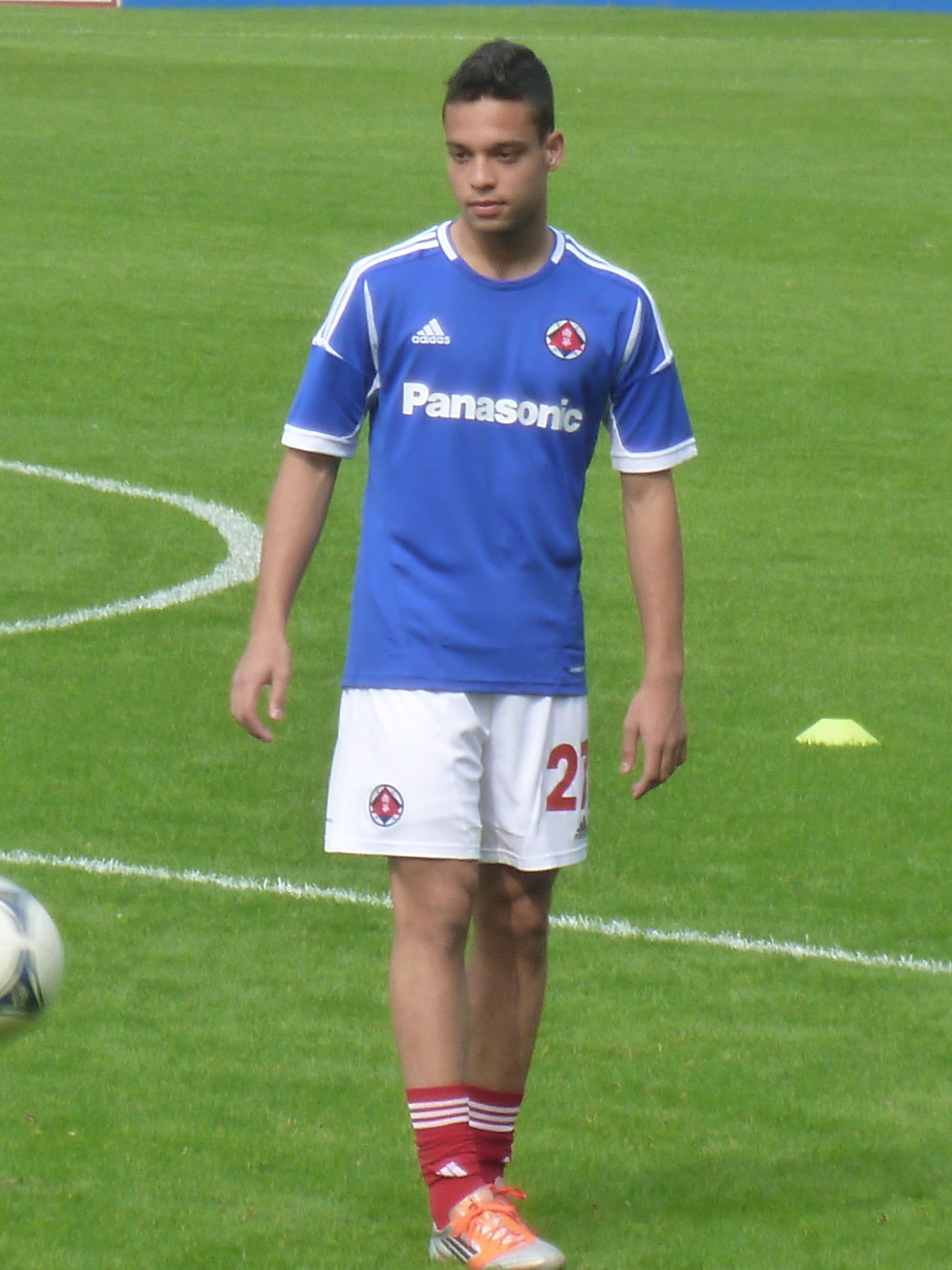

Personal information
- Full name: Filipe de Souza Conceição
- Date of birth: 11 November 1995 (age 30)
- Place of birth: Penedo, Brazil
- Height: 1.75 m (5 ft 9 in)
- Position: Striker

Youth career
- 2011–2012: South China

Senior career*
Years	Team	Apps	(Gls)
2012–2014	South China	1	(0)
2013–2014	→ Sun Hei (loan)	6	(0)
2016–2017	Eastern District	1	(0)
2017	Metro Gallery	12	(3)
2017–2018	Resources Capital	20	(5)
2017–2020	Lucky Mile	20	(2)
- * Club domestic league appearances and goals

Filipe de Souza Conceição (Chinese: 菲臘; born 11 November 1995) is a Brazilian former professional footballer.

== Early life ==
Filipe was born in Brazil in 1995. He is the son of ex-South China player Anílton da Conceição. Two years after he was born, his family moved to Hong Kong since Anílton da Conceição was pursuing his football career in Hong Kong.

== Club career ==
=== South China ===
In 2011, Filipe joined South China's youth academy, also known as Wanchai South China.

==== 2012–13 season ====
On 8 December 2012, Filipe was selected to the first team squad for friendly match against S.L. Benfica de Macau. Filipe was substituted in the second half of the friendly match. On 17 December 2012, about a week after he played his first match for the first team, he, alongside Kouta Jige, signed professional contracts with South China. Five days later, he made his debut for South China in the league match against Sun Pegasus at Yuen Long Stadium. He replaced goalscorer Cheng Lai Hin as an 86th-minute substitute.

== Career statistics ==
=== Club ===
Updated 22 December 2012

Club	Season	Division	League		Senior Shield		League Cup		FA Cup		AFC Cup		Total	
Club	Season	Division	Apps	Goals	Apps	Goals	Apps	Goals	Apps	Goals	Apps	Goals	Apps	Goals
South China	2012–13	First Division	1	0	0	0	—	—	0	0	N/A	N/A	1	0
South China Total			1	0	0	0	0	0	0	0	0	0	1	0
Total			1	0	0	0	0	0	0	0	0	0	1	0
