= Víctor Chou =

Footballer (born 1992)

Personal information
- Full name: Víctor Zi-hsuan Chou Hsieh
- Date of birth: 5 February 1992 (age 34)
- Place of birth: Madrid, Spain
- Height: 1.78 m (5 ft 10 in)
- Position: Central midfielder

Youth career
- 1999–2000: Asociación Deportiva Juvenil (futsal)
- 2000–2004: Balompié Tres Cantos
- 2004–2006: Atlético Madrid
- 2006–2009: Valladolid
- 2009–2012: Salamanca

Senior career*
Years	Team	Apps	(Gls)
2011–2012	Salamanca B	16	(2)
2013	South China	1	(0)
2013	Shenzhen Ruby	1	(0)

International career^{‡}
2011	Chinese Taipei U23	1	(0)
2009–2015	Chinese Taipei	10	(0)
- * Club domestic league appearances and goals as of 31 May 2013 ‡ National team caps and goals as of 17 March 2015

Víctor Zi-hsuan Chou Hsieh (traditional Chinese: 周子軒; simplified Chinese: 周子轩, born 5 February 1992), commonly known as Víctor Chou, is a footballer who plays as a central midfielder. In his youth career, he has played for youth teams of several reputable clubs such as Atlético Madrid and Real Valladolid. In January 2012, he left U.D. Salamanca and went to Asia for new challenges. Born in Spain, he made ten appearances for the Chinese Taipei national team.

== Early life ==
Chou's parents, Pepe Chou Huo-lien (Chinese: 周火煉) and Hsieh Chi (Chinese: 謝琦), are both from Taiwan. After graduating from the National Taiwan Institute of Arts, they emigrated to Spain to study fine arts there. As his father is passionate about football, he and his Spanish family (babysitters) instilled in Chou the concepts of the sport.

== Club career ==
=== Early career ===
When he was still a child, his babysitter and her husband found Chou's football talents and suggested Pepe to let him have formal training. Chou then joined Asociación Deportiva Juvenil, which is a futsal team in Tres Cantos. After three impressed matches, he joined the local amateur team Balompié Tres Cantos.

=== Atlético Madrid ===
In 2002, Chou joined Atlético Madrid's youth team, despite the fact that his parents were loyal fans of rival Real Madrid. In 2005, he was offered a contract by the youth team of Real Valladolid and decided to move there.

=== Valladolid ===
Chou's stay at the Pucela club was long and successful. He played many games as a youth player here.

=== Salamanca ===
In 2009, Chou transferred to UD Salamanca's youth team (Division Juvenil de Honor). In 2010, sources have said that Chou has been called up many times by the 1st team of UD Salamanca to participate in training and eventually play official matches in 2011 or 2012.

==== Salmantino ====
He was playing in third division. Afterwards, Chou was on trial at Shanghai Shenhua where he got his 5th metatarsal injury twice.

He went back to Spain to have a surgery by Real Valladolid doctor Oscar de la Hoya.

=== South China ===
On 16 March 2013, Victor was offered a trial with Hong Kong First Division club South China On 29 March 2013, Steven Lo, chairman of South China, confirmed the signing of Victor Chou for the rest of the season.

=== Shenzhen ===
On July, Victor signed a contract for Shenzhen F.C., managed by Philippe Troussier.

== International career ==
Víctor Chou was born in Spain, and both of his parents are Taiwanese; therefore, he was able to represent both Spain and Chinese Taipei at an international level. As his performance was well in Valladolid, the CTFA was attracted and called him up to the national team in June 2009. In July 2010, the president of CTFA, Lu Kun-Shan, met with Chou and invited him to represent Chinese Taipei U23 for the 2012 London Olympics qualifying. On 9 March 2011, he played for Chinese Taipei U23 in the starting 11 and played for the whole match, but Chinese Taipei lost the match by 0–2. On 29 February 2012, he made his debut for the Chinese Taipei senior team, substituting for his teammate Chen Yi-wei after 72 minutes in a friendly match against Hong Kong.

== Personal life ==
At a young age he was a part-time model, serving at Spain's largest department store El Corte Ingles, and doing interpretation for brands such as ZARA, Gstar.

== Career statistics ==
=== Club ===
As of 29 March 2013

Appearances and goals by club, season and competition
Club	Season	League			Cup		Continental		Other		Total	
Club	Season	Division	Apps	Goals	Apps	Goals	Apps	Goals	Apps	Goals	Apps	Goals
Salamanca B	2011–12	Tercera División Group 8	16	2	—		—		—		16	2
South China	2012–13	First Division	1	0	0	0	0	0	0	0	1	0
Career total			18	2	0	0	0	0	0	0	18	2
