= Leandro Rodrigues =

Brazilian footballer

Personal information
- Full name: Leandro Rodrigues
- Date of birth: 31 January 1982 (age 44)
- Place of birth: Guarulhos, Brazil
- Height: 1.87 m (6 ft 1 1/2 in)
- Position: Forward

Team information
- Current team: Veranópolis

Youth career
- 1999–2000: Mirassol

Senior career*
Years	Team	Apps	(Gls)
2001	Oita Trinita	4	(0)
2002	São Caetano	25	(10)
2003–2004	Mogi Mirim	27	(8)
2004	Mirassol	15	(4)
2005	Grêmio Barueri	11	(5)
2005–2012	Iraty	48	(31)
2006	→ Santos (loan)	10	(1)
2007	→ Grêmio Barueri (loan)	0	(0)
2008	→ Ponte Preta (loan)	2	(1)
2009	→ Kalmar FF (loan)	1	(0)
2010	→ Canoas (loan)	10	
2011	→ Chapecoense (loan)		
2012	→ Brusque (loan)		
2012	South China	4	(1)
2012	Veranópolis		
- * Club domestic league appearances and goals as of 10 September 2012

Leandro Rodrigues (born 31 January 1982) is a Brazilian football striker who plays for Veranópolis Esporte Clube Recreativo e Cultural.

== Career ==
Born in Guarulhos, Brazil, he begin playing in the youth teams of Mirassol in 1999. In 2001, he moved abroad and made his senior debut playing with Oita Trinita in the J2 League. After that season in Japan, he was back to Brazil playing with São Caetano in the Campeonato Brasileiro Série A during 2002. The club had just been league vice-champions two years in the row, and it was no surprise that they reached the Copa Libertadores final that year, although Leandro was not part of the teams that played the final.

In 2003 Leandro signed with Mogi Mirim where he will play until mid-2004 in the Série B, when he returned to lower league Mirassol to play until the end of the year. He started 2005 playing with Grêmio Barueri in the Série C, but finished the year playing with Iraty, a club that signed him on a long-term contract.

In 2006, he was loaned to the all-mighty Santos FC winning with them the Campeonato Paulista and finishing 4th in the Série A.

He was loaned to Grêmio Barueri in July 2007.

In 2008, he was loaned to Ponte Preta playing with them in the Campeonato Brasileiro Série B. In this period he also played with Swedish side Kalmar FF. In 2010, he was loaned to Canoas (sometimes referred as Ulbra – RS) and in 2011 to Chapecoense.

On 9 July 2012, Leandro signed with Hong Kong outfit South China. He started for them in the first 4 league matches of the 2012–13 season, scoring once in a 2–2 draw against Sunray Cave JC Sun Hei. However, the club's signing of another Brazilian striker Mauro made Leandro expendable. He wasn't included in South China's playing list for the league match against Wofoo Tai Po on 7 October, and was subsequently released right after the match.

== Club statistics ==
Club performance			League		Cup		League Cup		Total	
Season	Club	League	Apps	Goals	Apps	Goals	Apps	Goals	Apps	Goals
Japan			League		Emperor's Cup		J.League Cup		Total	
2001	Oita Trinita	J2 League	4	0	0	0	0	0	4	0
Total			4	0	0	0	0	0	4	0

== Honours ==
São Caetano

- Copa Libertadores runner-up: 2002

Barueri

- Campeonato Paulista Série A2: 2005

Santos

- Campeonato Paulista: 2006
