= Mauro (footballer, born May 1984) =

Brazilian footballer

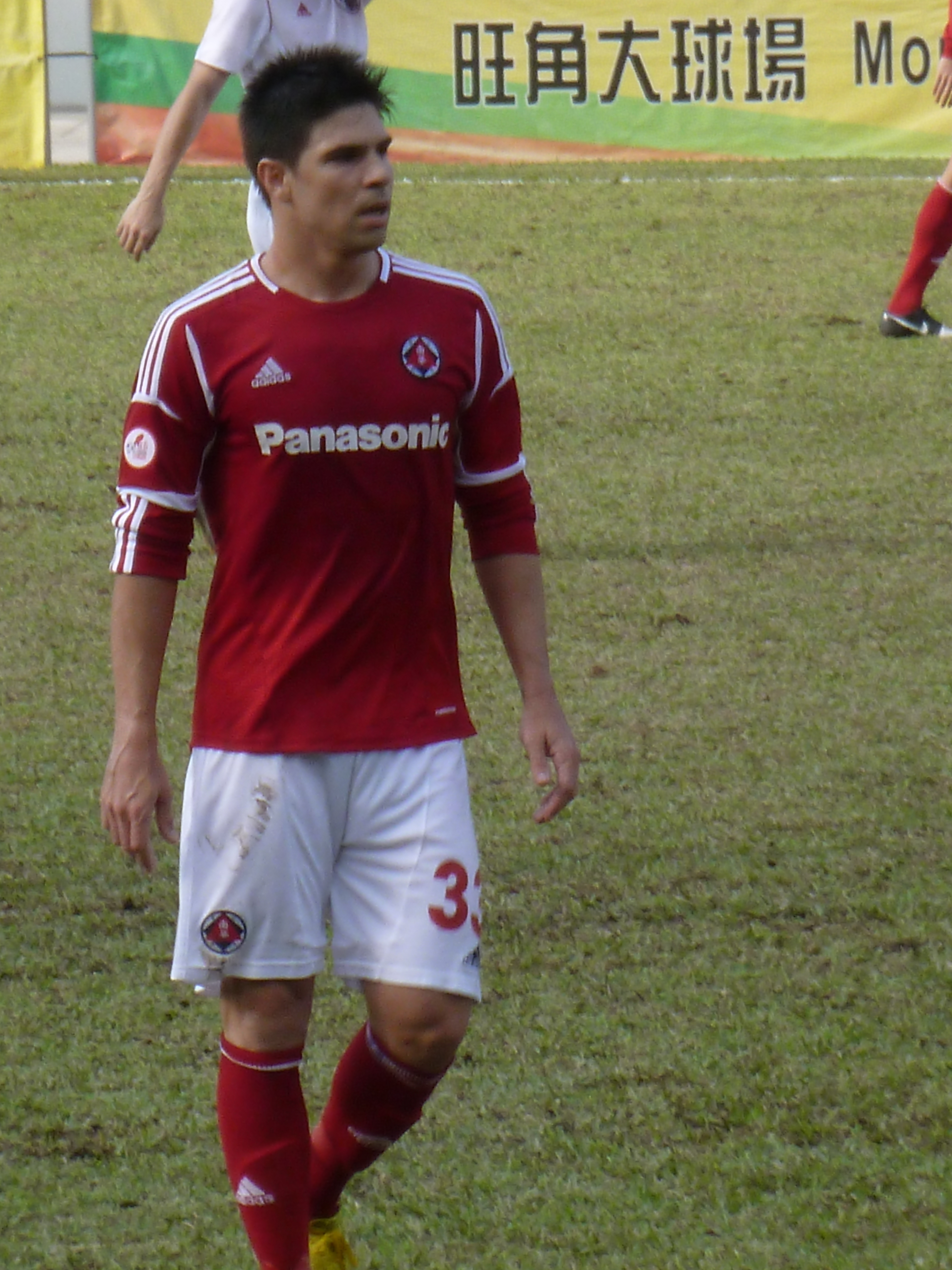

Personal information
- Full name: Mauro Rafael da Silva
- Date of birth: 20 May 1984 (age 42)
- Place of birth: Sapucaia do Sul, Brazil
- Height: 1.86 m (6 ft 1 in)
- Position: Forward

Youth career
- 2002–2003: RS Futebol Clube

Senior career*
Years	Team	Apps	(Gls)
2003–2005	RS Futebol Clube	0	(0)
2004	→ Pelotas (loan)		
2004	→ Fluminense (loan)	10	(2)
2006–2009	Lausanne	42	(17)
2009	Novo Hamburgo	0	(0)
2010–2011	Caxias	1	(0)
2011	Cruzeiro		
2012	Esportivo	20	(4)
2012–2013	South China	5	(1)
2013–	Defensor San Alejandro		
- * Club domestic league appearances and goals as of 1 February 2013

Mauro Rafael da Silva (born 20 May 1984) is a Brazilian footballer who plays as a forward.

== Career ==
Born in Sapucaia do Sul, Rio Grande do Sul, Mauro started his career with RS Futebol Clube. He signed a 5-year contract in September 2001. Mauro played in 2003 Campeonato Brasileiro Série C and scored 4 goals in 2004 Campeonato Gaúcho Segunda Divisão. In mid-2004 he was signed by Fluminense and played 10 times in 2004 Campeonato Brasileiro Série A. In August 2005, he extended his contract with club until November 2007. He then transferred to Lausanne-Sport along with team-mate Marco Balthazar in February 2006. He failed to play any matches in Swiss Super League. In September 2009, he was signed by Novo Hamburgo for 2009 Copa FGF. In December 2009 he signed a 1-year contract with Caxias along with former RS team-mate Marcos Rogério. He played for the team at 2010 Campeonato Gaúcho and played once in 2010 Campeonato Brasileiro Série C.

=== South China ===
On 27 September 2012, South China chairman Steven Lo announced that Mauro joined the club for an undisclosed fee and is given shirt number 33. Mauro made his debut as a second half sub against Tai Po on 7 October 2012.

On 1 February 2013, Mauro was released by the club.
