= Chak Ting Fung =

Hong Kong footballer

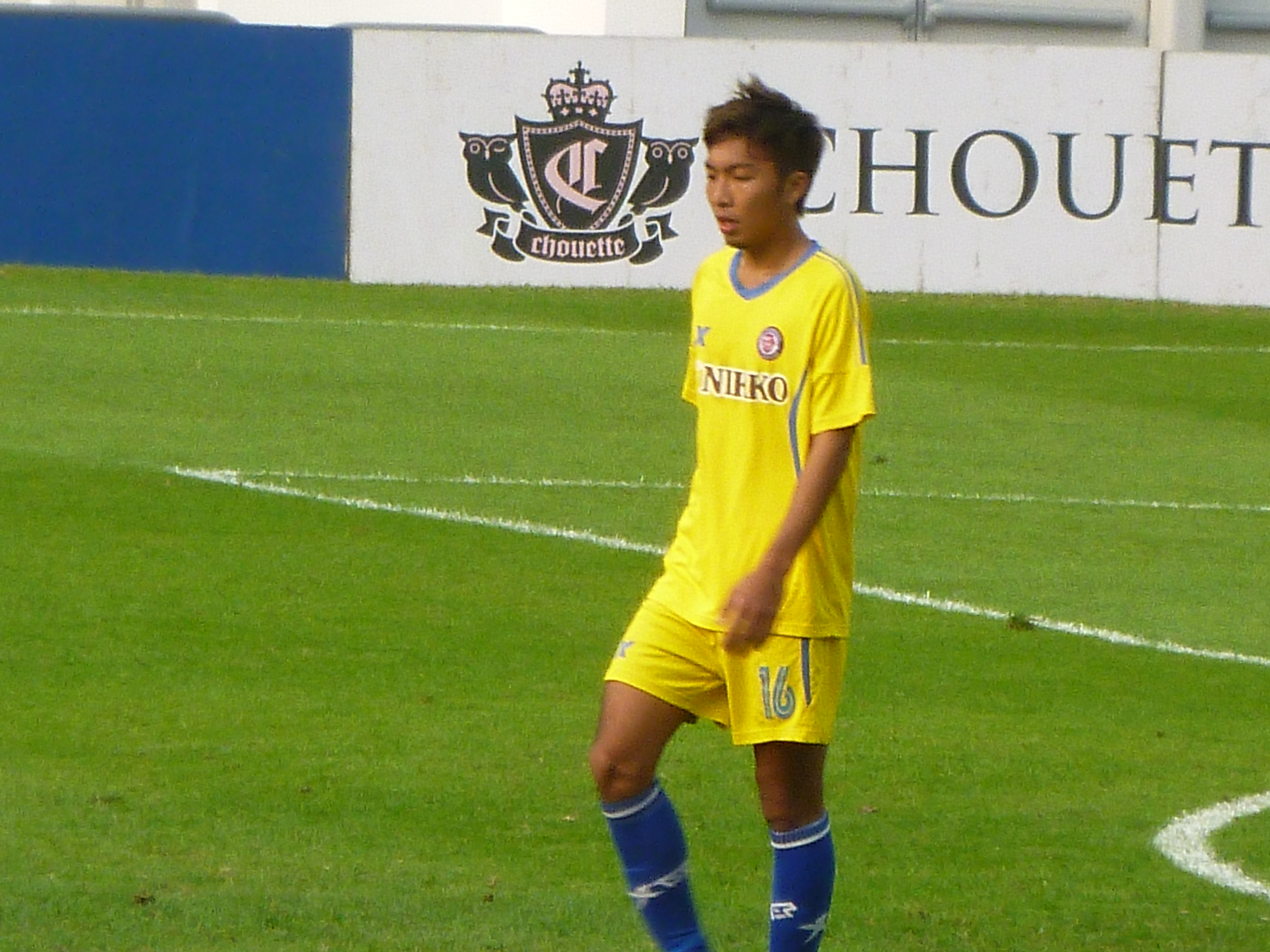

Personal information
- Full name: Chak Ting Fung
- Date of birth: 27 November 1989 (age 36)
- Place of birth: Hong Kong
- Height: 1.75 m (5 ft 9 in)
- Positions: Right back; left back

Team information
- Current team: Southern
- Number: 16

Youth career
- 2002–2005: Rangers (HKG)

Senior career*
Years	Team	Apps	(Gls)
2005–2008	Rangers (HKG)	18	(0)
2008–2012	Metro Gallery	65	(3)
2012–2013	Rangers (HKG)	9	(1)
2013–2017	South China	40	(0)
2017–2019	Tai Po	31	(0)
2019–2021	Eastern	19	(0)
2021–	Southern	78	(0)

International career^{‡}
2007–2012	Hong Kong U-23		
2010–2012	Hong Kong	12	(0)
- * Club domestic league appearances and goals as of 21 November 2026 ‡ National team caps and goals as of 11 September 2013

Chak Ting Fung (Chinese: 翟廷峯; pinyin: Zhái Tíngfēng; Cantonese Yale: Jaahk Tìngfūng; born 27 November 1989) is a Hong Kong professional footballer who currently plays as a right back or a left back for Hong Kong Premier League club Southern.

== Club career ==
=== Rangers ===
Chak gave up his studies after completing Form 4 and took up professional football when he was only 16.

==== 2009–10 season ====
On 22 May 2010, after a 0–3 loss to Pegasus, Chak was taken by team boss Philip Lee to the stands to meet South China convener Steven Lo, sparking rumours in the press that he would join the Caroliners. But in the end he stayed with the club.

==== 2010–11 season ====
During the 2010–11 season, due to the cut on foreigners quota, Chak was named by Philip Lee as an important prospect for the club, along with teammate Lam Hok Hei.

However, in January 2011, Chak was highly criticised by Rangers boss Philip Lee, for "sleepwalking" on the pitch after the club lost a league game to Pegasus. Philip added that he had no choice but to put him on sale. Later in June, Chak confirmed he would stay with Rangers.

=== South China ===
Chak joined South China in January 2013.

=== Tai Po ===
After South China's decision to self-relegate in June 2017, Chak left the club. He later joined his former South China teammates Tsang Man Fai and Leung Kwun Chung at Tai Po.

=== Eastern ===
On 17 July 2019, Eastern announced that they had signed Chak.

=== Southern ===
On 2 July 2021, Chak joined Southern after being released by Eastern.

== International career ==
=== Hong Kong ===
Chak's first game for Hong Kong national football team was at home against Yemen in a 2011 AFC Asian Cup qualification match in March 2010. Chak said he would treasure every second if he got on the pitch.

Chak was named in the 25-man squad to face Malaysia on 3 June 2011.

=== Hong Kong U23 ===
Chak was named in the initial 23-man squad for the 2009 East Asian Games. But on the eve of the tournament, he quit after suffering an injury. Chak was disappointed that he missed out on the gold medal.

In the 2010 Asian Games, he suffered a broken nose in the match against Bangladesh and underwent surgery in the hospital after the game. His nose was bandaged and although the doctor ordered him not to play, he appeared at the second round match against Oman with a face mask and was prepared to play. In the end, he was an unused substitute.

== Career statistics ==
=== International ===
As of 18 August 2012

National team	Year	Apps	Goals
Hong Kong	2010	4	0
Hong Kong	2011	4	0
Hong Kong	2012	4	0
Total		12	0

#	Date	Venue	Opponent	Result	Scored	Competition
1	3 March 2010	Hong Kong Stadium, Hong Kong	Yemen	0–0	0	2011 AFC Asian Cup qualification
2	9 October 2010	Kaohsiung National Stadium, Kaohsiung	Philippines	4–2	0	2010 Long Teng Cup
3	10 October 2010	Kaohsiung National Stadium, Kaohsiung	Macau	4–0	0	2010 Long Teng Cup
4	12 October 2010	Kaohsiung National Stadium, Kaohsiung	Chinese Taipei	1–1	0	2010 Long Teng Cup
5	23 July 2011	Prince Mohamed bin Fahd Stadium, Dammam	Saudi Arabia	0–3	0	2014 FIFA World Cup qualification
6	30 September 2011	Kaohsiung National Stadium, Kaohsiung	Philippines	3–3	0	2011 Long Teng Cup
7	2 October 2011	Kaohsiung National Stadium, Kaohsiung	Macau	5–1	0	2011 Long Teng Cup
8	4 October 2011	Kaohsiung National Stadium, Kaohsiung	Chinese Taipei	6–0	0	2011 Long Teng Cup
9	29 February 2012	Mong Kok Stadium, Hong Kong	Chinese Taipei	5–1	0	Friendly
10	1 June 2012	Hong Kong Stadium, Hong Kong	Singapore	1–0	0	Friendly
11	10 June 2012	Mong Kok Stadium, Hong Kong	Vietnam	1–2	0	Friendly
12	15 August 2012	Jurong West Stadium, Singapore	Singapore	0–2	0	Friendly

== Honours ==
=== Club ===
Eastern

- Hong Kong Senior Shield: 2019–20
- Hong Kong FA Cup: 2019–20

Tai Po

- Hong Kong Premier League: 2018–19

Southern

- Hong Kong Sapling Cup: 2022–23, 2024–25

== Personal life ==
Chak married his girlfriend Ceci on 4 November 2019.
