= Tin Man Ho =

Chinese footballer

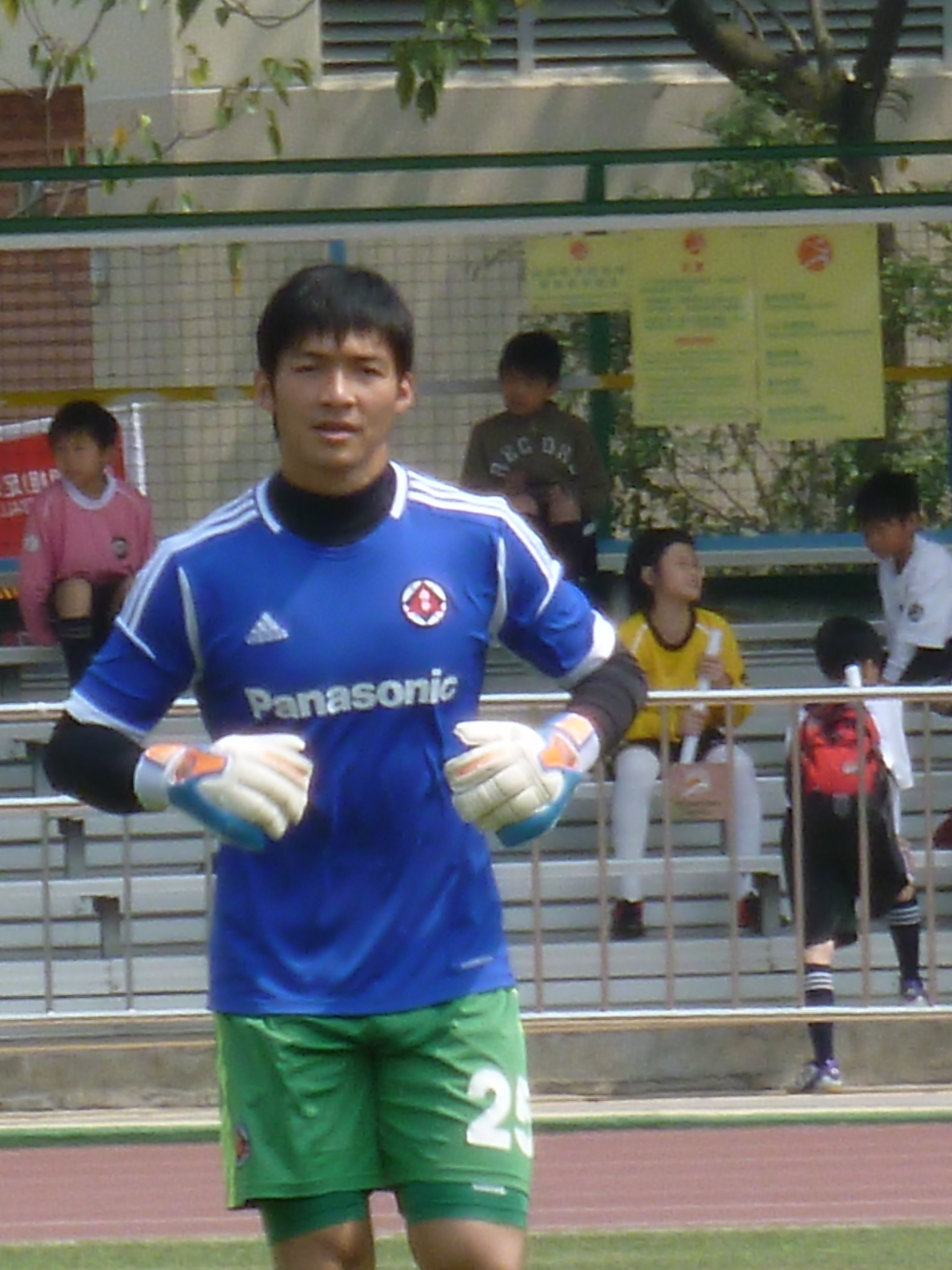

Personal information
- Full name: Barson Tin Man Ho
- Date of birth: 5 March 1990 (age 36)
- Place of birth: British Hong Kong
- Height: 1.83 m (6 ft 0 in)
- Position: Goalkeeper

Youth career
- 2004–2008: Kitchee
- 2007–2010: South China

Senior career*
Years	Team	Apps	(Gls)
2005–2006	City FC		
2006–2007	HKSSF		
2008–2010	South China		
2010–2012	Wanchai		
2012–2017	South China		
2019	Wong Tai Sin	4	(0)
2020–2021	Wanchai	3	(0)

International career
2012	Hong Kong		
2013	Hong Kong U-23		
2016	Hong Kong (futsal)		

Managerial career
- 2015–2017: South China
- 2017: Benfica Academy, China
- 2019: Shenzhen
- 2019: City University of Hong Kong
- 2021: Qingdao
- 2021: Fusion
- 2021: FC Tigers Vancouver
- 2022: Douglas College - Douglas Royals
- 2022: UBC Thunderbirds
- 2022: Vancouver United Hibernian
- 2023: Nautsa’mawt FC
- 2025: Altitude FC
- 2025: Vancouver United
- * Club domestic league appearances and goals

Barson Tin Man Ho (Chinese: 田文豪; Jyutping: tin^{4} man^{4} hou^{4}; born 5 March 1990) is a former Hong Kong professional footballer who played as a goalkeeper. He is currently a goalkeeper coach.

== Club career ==
=== Early career ===
Tin joined the South China youth academy when he was young. He studied in Carmel Divine Grace Foundation Secondary School for form one to four and then studied in Yan Chai Hospital Tung Chi Ying Memorial Secondary School

During his following secondary school life, in which he played for the school football team. He got the Best Defensive Player and Champion at Hong Kong secondary school level. Also represented Hong Kong for the international level of secondary school football tournament like Asian Secondary School Football Championship, and the champion of Inter-port Secondary School Football Championship.

He got the MVP of Hong Kong U20 and Nike Cup Champion in 2009.

He played for Hong Kong U15 & U17.

=== Wanchai ===
Tin was loaned to South China's partner, Wanchai in the 2010–11 season. He featured in every single game for the club in the first season.

On 18 February 2012, Tin helped the club claim the champions of Hong Kong Junior Challenge Shield after defeating Happy Valley 3–0.

He was in Hong Kong U21.

=== South China ===
Tin returned to first division club South China after spending two seasons at Wanchai.

He made his debut for South China in the 2012–2013 season. He made several saves to keep his clean sheet and helped the team defeat Biu Chun Rangers. He got the league champion in the first season in South China.

After the season, Tin decided to continue his university study at City University of Hong Kong. He was transforming from player to coach for South China.

He represented Hong Kong in different international university football tournaments like Asian University football tournament in South Korea, and he was awarded “The Best Goalkeeper” in China University Football Championship.

=== Vancouver United Hibernian ===
Tin joined Vancouver United Hibernian as a player coach due to the relationship with UBC Men’s soccer program. Especially in the 2022 season, Tin played more than half of the season due to the goalkeeper’s injuries crisis.

=== Surrey FC Pegasus ===
Tin joined Surrey FC Pegasus as a goalkeeper for VMSL Vancouver Metro Soccer League Premier Team. Also as attacker and goalkeeper for VMSL Over 35 Master Premier Team.

== Coaching career ==
=== South China ===
In 2015, Tin was promoted to goalkeeper player coach by manager and former Hong Kong National Team goalkeeper coach Chu Kwok Kuen. Ex-Ecuador national football team goalkeeper Cristian Mora, who played all matches for Ecuador in 2006 FIFA World Cup, was one of the goalkeepers that Tin trained in South China.

=== Guangzhou Evergrande & Nanjing FA ===
In 2017, after South China, Tin went to Guangzhou Evergrande U17 to be a goalkeeper coach. Due to some policies in Guangzhou Evergrande, Tin did not finish the contract signing process, and moved to Nanjing FA as U12 Head Coach. Tin met the Chairman of Guangzhou Evergrande Football School, Liu Jiangnan, during this period of time.

=== Benfica Academy China ===
In 2018, the Ex-Chairman of Guangzhou Evergrande Football School, Liu Jiangnan, invited Tin to Benfica Academy, China, as the Head of Goalkeeper Coach.

=== Shenzhen FC ===
In 2019, Tin joined Shenzhen as a U19 Goalkeeper Coach. He went to Finland for a new challenge before Shenzhen's relegation but returned to Hong Kong due to Covid.

=== City University of Hong Kong ===
In 2019, Tin returned to CityU as a guest coach in the football department. Tin always returned to CityU when he stays in Hong Kong.

=== Wan Chai ===
In 2020, Tin was invited to join Wan Chai as a player-coach, one of the legends in 10+ years ago, winning the major trophies with the club.

=== Hong Kong Wonderful Football Club ===
In 2020, Tin was invited to join HKWFC as Goalkeeper Coach, for Hong Kong Women's Football League.

=== All Black FC ===
In late 2020, Tin was invited to join All Black FC as Goalkeeper Coach, to help the refugees and ethnic minorities get into Hong Kong's society by football with locals and foreigners.

=== Qingdao FC ===
In 2021, Tin was invited to Qingdao U19 as Goalkeeper Coach.

=== Fusion FC ===
In 2021, Tin joined Fusion FC in Vancouver, Canada. Fusion FC in British Columbia Soccer Premier League.

=== FC Tigers Vancouver ===
In 2021, Tin joined FC Tigers Vancouver.

=== Douglas Royals ===
In 2022, Tin was invited to Douglas Royals Soccer Team which represents Douglas College. Assistant coach / Goalkeeper coaching for both Men's & Women's soccer teams.

=== UBC Thunderbirds ===
In 2022, Tin joined University of British Columbia Mens Soccer team - UBC Thunderbirds as Goalkeeper Coach. Winning the 2024 U Sports National Champion. Being coaching in both UBC Men's and Women's at 2025.

=== Nautsa’mawt FC ===
In 2023, Tin joined Nautsa’mawt FC in League 1 Canada League 1 BC as Goalkeeper Coach.

=== Altitude FC ===
In 2025, Tin joined Altitude FC in League 1 Canada League 1 BC as Goalkeeper Coach for both Men’s and Women’s Team.

=== Vancouver United ===
In 2025, Tin was appointed as Lead of Goalkeeping for Vancouver United.
