= Marcos Rogério (footballer) =

Brazilian footballer (born 1985)

Personal information
- Full name: Marcos Rogério Oliveira Duarte
- Date of birth: 5 May 1985 (age 41)
- Place of birth: Quaraí, Brazil
- Height: 1.72 m (5 ft 7 1/2 in)
- Position: Defensive midfielder

Team information
- Current team: CRAC-GO

Youth career
- RS Futebol Clube

Senior career*
Years	Team	Apps	(Gls)
2003–2007	RS Futebol Clube		
2004	→ Juventude (loan)	4	(0)
2005–2007	→ Grêmio (loan)	?	(?)
2007	Guarani-VA	0	(0)
2007	Taquaritinga	0	(0)
2008	Santa Cruz-RS	0	(0)
2008	Cruzeiro-RS	0	(0)
2008	São José-SP	0	(0)
2009	Porto Alegre	0	(0)
2010–2011	Caxias	6	(0)
2011	Luverdense	6	(0)
2012	Veranópolis	16	(0)
2013	São Luiz	11	(0)
2013	Ferroviário	0	(0)
2014	Veranópolis	13	(0)
2014–	CRAC-GO	0	(0)
- * Club domestic league appearances and goals

Marcos Rogério Oliveira Duarte known as Marcos Rogério or just Rogério (born 5 May 1985) is a Brazilian footballer who plays as a defensive midfielder for CRAC.

== Career ==
Born in Quaraí, Rio Grande do Sul, Marcos Rogério started his career with RS Futebol Clube, which he played in 2003 Campeonato Brasileiro Série C. He signed a new 3-year contract in August 2004. He then loaned to Juventude and played a few matches at 2004 Campeonato Brasileiro Série A. In July 2005 he was signed by Grêmio in 2-year deal, which he finished as the champion of 2005 Campeonato Brasileiro Série B. He also extended his contract with RS until 30 June 2009 in August 2005. He was released by Grêmio in February 2007 and joined Esporte Clube Guarani. After the end of 2007 Campeonato Gaúcho, he left for Taquaritinga in July, agreed a contract until 30 December 2008. He played for the team at 2007 Copa Energil C.

In January 2008, he left for Santa Cruz do Sul until the end of 2008 Campeonato Gaúcho. In April he left for Cruzeiro de Porto Alegre until the end of 2008 Campeonato Gaúcho Segunda Divisão and in June left for São José dos Campos, agreed a 1-year contract. He played 10 matches in 2008 Copa Paulista but failed to play any match in 2009 Campeonato Paulista Série A2.

He was signed by Porto Alegre Futebol Clube in March 2009.

In December 2009, he was signed by Caxias along with RS team-mate Mauro. He played for the team at 2010 Campeonato Gaúcho, 2010 Campeonato Brasileiro Série C and 2010 Copa FGF.
