= Clifton F.C. =

Clifton F.C. may refer to:

- Clifton All Whites F.C., an association football club from Nottingham
- Clifton Association F.C., a former football club from Bristol
