= Chu Kwok Kuen =

Hong Kong footballer

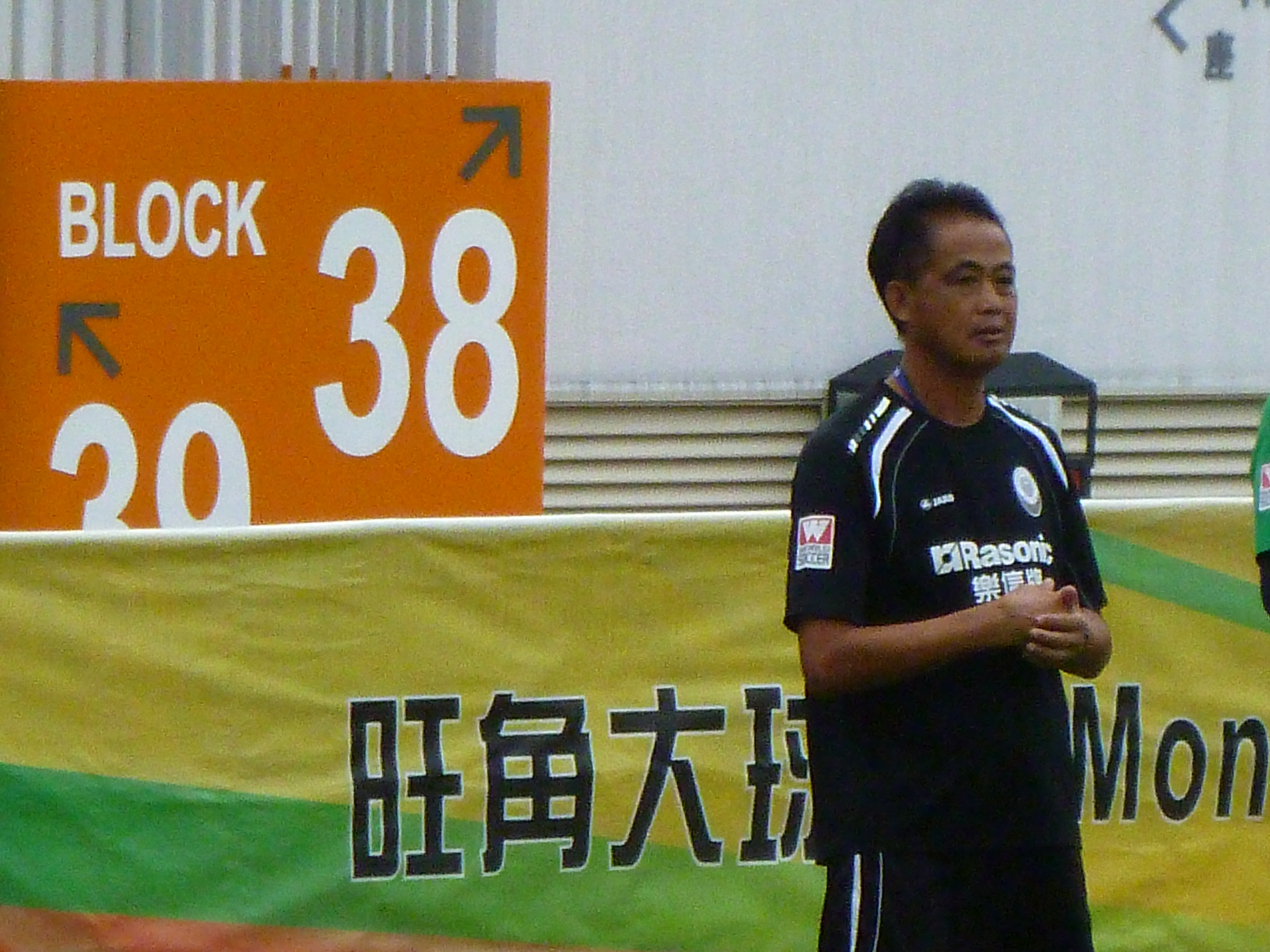

Personal information
- Full name: Chu Kwok Kuen
- Date of birth: 24 August
- Place of birth: Hong Kong
- Position: Goalkeeper

Senior career*
Years	Team	Apps	(Gls)
1971–1973	Hong Kong Rangers FC		
- Seiko SA

International career
1974–1978	Hong Kong	30	(0)

Managerial career
- Citizen AA
- * Club domestic league appearances and goals

Chu Kwok Kuen (Chinese: 朱國權; Cantonese Yale: Jyū Gwokkyùn) is a former football player for the Hong Kong national football team. He was the head coach of Citizen AA in the Hong Kong First Division.

Chu was the goalkeeper coach of the Hong Kong national football team, Hong Kong 08 and the youth teams from 2000 to 2010.

He holds an AFC Grade A Coach licence.
