= Kouta Jige =

Hong Kong footballer (born 1997)

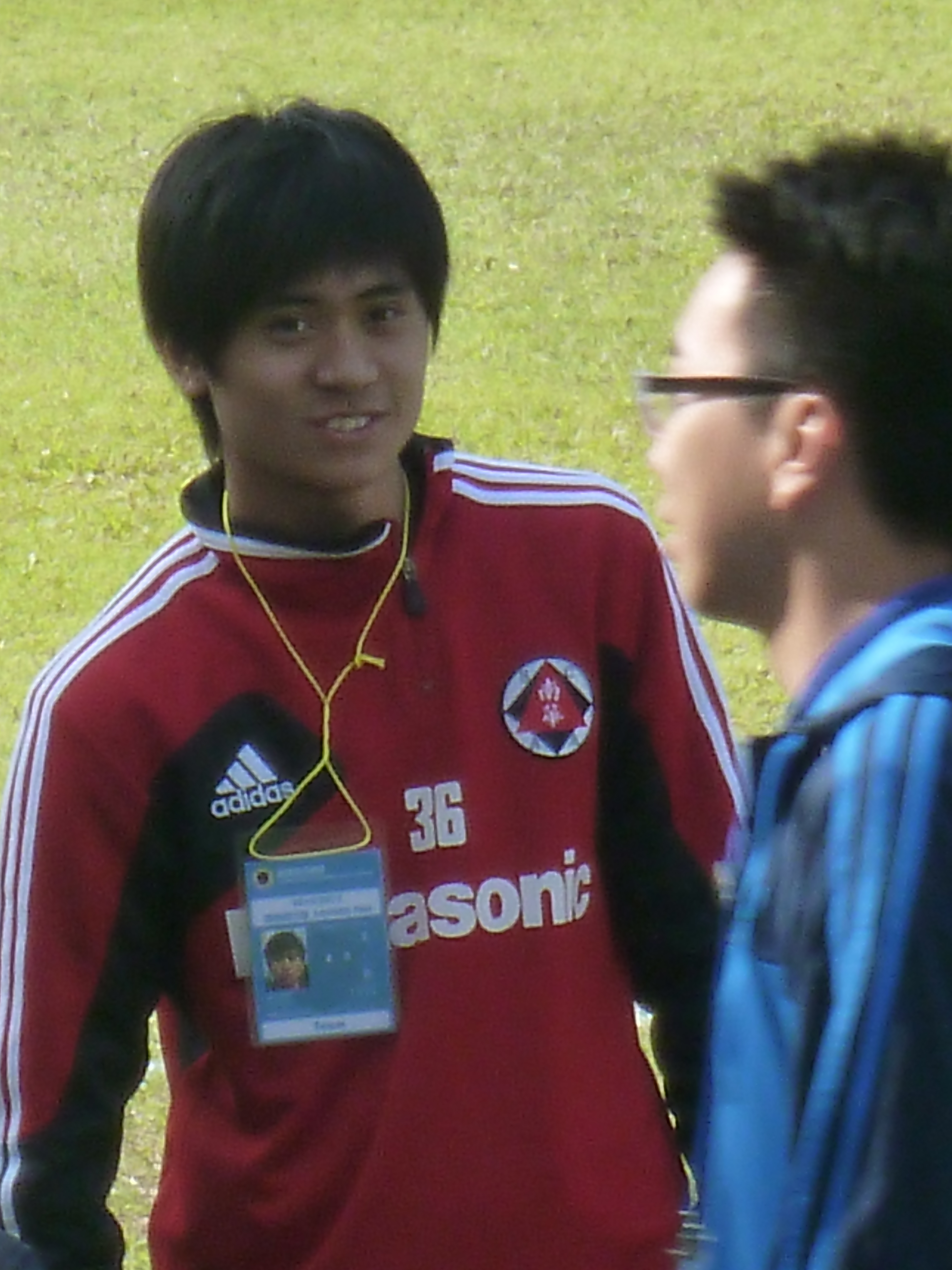

Personal information
- Full name: English: Kouta Jige; Japanese: 地下浩多; Traditional Chinese: 地下浩多
- Date of birth: 23 April 1997 (age 29)
- Place of birth: Hong Kong
- Height: 1.64 m (5 ft 5 in)
- Position: Right midfielder

Youth career
- 2011–2012: South China

Senior career*
Years	Team	Apps	(Gls)
2012–2015	South China	4	(0)
2016	Biu Chun Rangers		
2016–2017	Wan Chai	9	(1)
2017–2018	TSV73 Yokkaichi		
- * Club domestic league appearances and goals

Kouta Jige (地下 浩多, Jige Kouta) (born 23 April 1997) is a Hong Kong former footballer.

== Club career ==
=== South China ===
==== Youth team ====
In 2011, Jige joined South China youth academy, also known as Wanchai South China.

==== 2012–13 season ====
On 8 December 2012, Jige was selected to the first team squad for friendly match against S.L. Benfica de Macau. Jige was substituted in the second half of the friendly match. On 17 December 2012, about a week after he played his first match for the first team, he, signed a professional contract with South China. He soon made his debut for South China first team on 26 December 2012, in the FA Cup first round first leg away match against Citizen at Mong Kok Stadium, as an 86th-minute substitute, which he helped the team secure the 2–0 victory.

== Career statistics ==
As of 26 December 2012

Club	Season	Division	League		Senior Shield		League Cup		FA Cup		AFC Cup		Total	
Club	Season	Division	Apps	Goals	Apps	Goals	Apps	Goals	Apps	Goals	Apps	Goals	Apps	Goals
South China	2012–13	First Division	0	0	0	0	—	—	3	0	N/A	N/A	3	0
South China Total			0	0	0	0	0	0	3	0	0	0	3	0
Total			0	0	0	0	0	0	3	0	0	0	3	0
