= Sean Tse =

Hong Kong football player (born 1992)

Sean Tse 謝家強
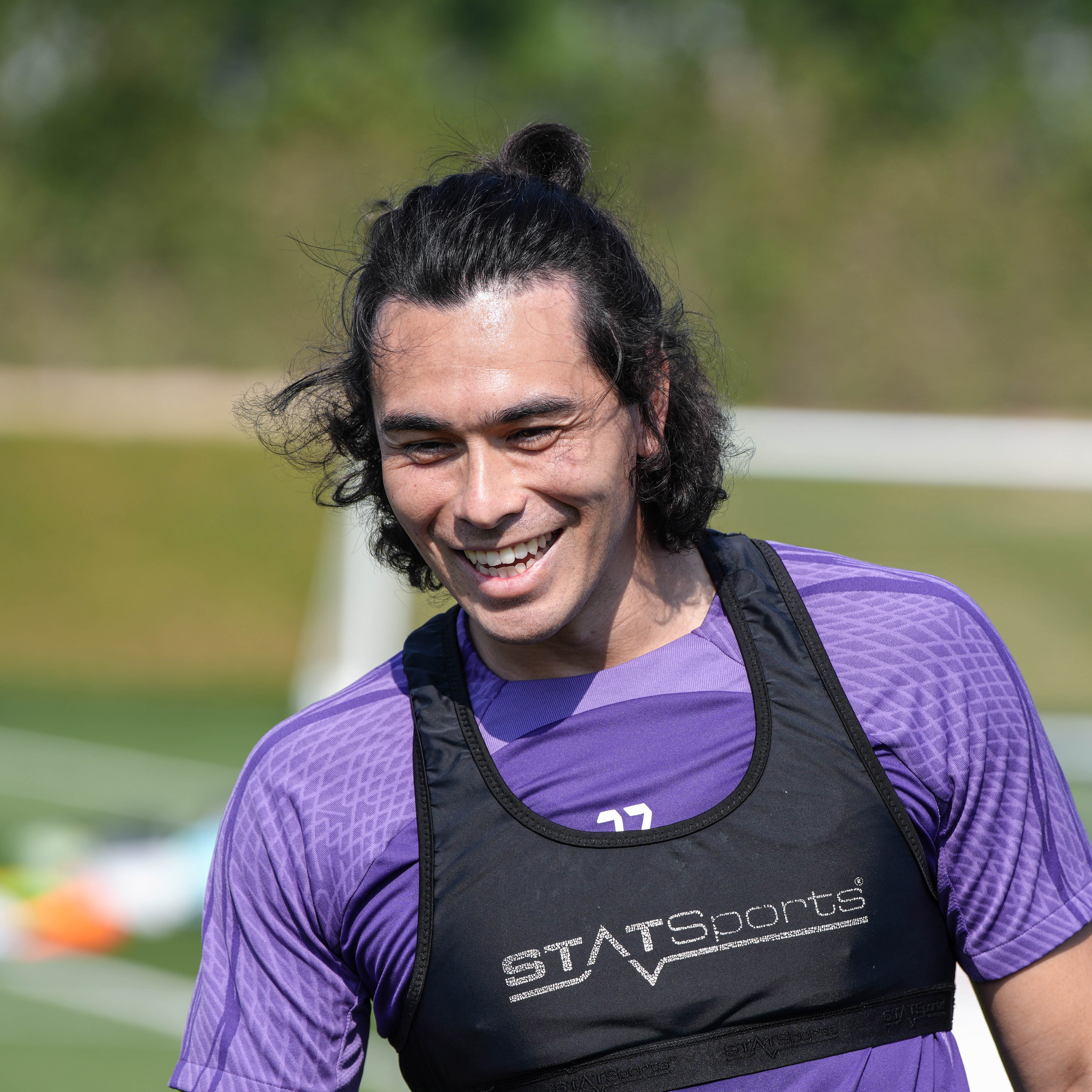
- Tse training with Hong Kong in 2023

Personal information
- Full name: Sean Tse Ka Keung
- Date of birth: 3 May 1992 (age 34)
- Place of birth: Salford, England
- Height: 1.85 m (6 ft 1 in)
- Positions: Centre back; defensive midfielder

Team information
- Current team: Stalybridge Celtic

Youth career
- 2004–2005: Manchester United
- 2005–2012: Manchester City

Senior career*
Years	Team	Apps	(Gls)
2012–2017	South China	58	(5)
2017–2018	Tai Po	7	(1)
2018–2020	R&F	27	(3)
2021–2022	Kitchee	8	(0)
2023	Hyde United	4	(0)
2023–2024	Radcliffe		
2024–2026	Stalybridge Celtic		

International career^{‡}
2022	Hong Kong	8	(0)
- * Club domestic league appearances and goals as of 10:47, 17 March 2026 (UTC) ‡ National team caps and goals as of 24 September 2022

Sean Tse
- Traditional Chinese: 謝家強
- Simplified Chinese: 谢家强
Transcriptions
Standard Mandarin
- Hanyu Pinyin: Xiè Jiāqiáng
Yue: Cantonese
- Jyutping: Ze^{6} Gaa^{1} koeng^{4}

Sean Tse Ka Keung (pronounced [ʃɔn tsɛː˨ kɑː˥˧ kʰœːŋ˨˩], Chinese: 謝家強; born 3 May 1992) is a professional footballer. Born in England, he represented Hong Kong internationally.

== Club career ==
=== Manchester City ===
Tse was born in Salford, Greater Manchester, to a Hong Kongese father and an English mother of Irish descent. He went on trial with Manchester United in 2004 before joining Manchester City at under-14 level in September 2005. He spent the majority of seasons in the academy team, and was voted the Academy Player of the Month in November 2009. After finishing his time in the academy, he was released by Manchester City in May 2012.

=== South China ===
In August 2012, despite being linked with Oldham Athletic, Tse signed for Hong Kong side South China. He made his Hong Kong First Division League debut on 2 September 2012, coming on as a 74th-minute substitute in a 5–2 win over Yokohama FC Hong Kong at Hong Kong Stadium.

=== Tai Po ===
On 8 August 2017, Tai Po announced that they had signed Tse.

=== R&F ===
On 3 August 2018, it was confirmed that R&F had signed Tse. On 14 October 2020, Tse left the club after his club's withdrawal from the Hong Kong Premier League in the new season.

=== Kitchee ===
On 17 February 2021, Kitchee announced the signing of Tse. He made 8 appearances for the club. On 1 July 2022, Tse's contract expired and he left the club.

=== Hyde United ===
On 21 July 2023, Tse joined Northern Premier League Premier Division club Hyde United, a seventh tier club in English football.

=== Radcliffe ===
On 27 October 2023, Tse joined Radcliffe.

== International career ==
Tse is eligible for the Republic of Ireland through his maternal grand-parentage. Tse was called up for Republic of Ireland national under-17 team in April 2009 for two under-17 friendlies against Poland but he absented these two matches.

He has also shown interest in joining the Hong Kong national team and was listed on the training squad roster for the 2013 EAFF East Asian Cup in 2012. He was then called up by Kim Pan-Gon, the Hong Kong head coach, for the 2013 Guangdong–Hong Kong Cup.

On 18 August 2021, Tse was granted the HKSAR passport, making him eligible to represent Hong Kong internationally.

On 8 June 2022, Tse made his international debut for Hong Kong in the Asian Cup qualifiers against Afghanistan.

On 1 January 2024, Tse was called up to Hong Kong's squad for the 2023 AFC Asian Cup.

== Career statistics ==
=== Club ===
As of 16 April 2022

Club	Season	League			Continental		Cups		Total	
Club	Season	Division	Apps	Goals	Apps	Goals	Apps	Goals	Apps	Goals
South China	2012–13	Hong Kong First Division	13	0	–		5	1	18	1
South China	2013–14	Hong Kong First Division	11	2	4 (Note: Appearances in the AFC Cup)	0	6	0	21	2
South China	2014–15	Hong Kong Premier League	10	2	–		7	0	17	2
South China	2015–16	Hong Kong Premier League	11	0	–		7	0	18	0
South China	2016–17	Hong Kong Premier League	13	1	–		4	0	17	1
South China	Total		58	5	4	0	25	1	91	6
Tai Po	2017–18	Hong Kong Premier League	7	1	–		3	0	10	1
R&F	2018–19	Hong Kong Premier League	15	2	–		3	0	18	2
R&F	2019–20	Hong Kong Premier League	12	1	–		4	1	16	2
R&F	Total		27	3			7	1	34	4
Kitchee	2020–21	Hong Kong Premier League	7	0	–		0	0	7	0
Kitchee	2021–22	Hong Kong Premier League	1	0	1 (Note: Appearances in the AFC Champions League)	0	5	0	7	0
Kitchee	Total		8	0	1	0	5	0	14	0
Career total			100	9	5	0	40	2	149	11

=== International ===
As of 24 September 2022

National team	Year	Apps	Goals
Hong Kong	2022	8	0
Total		8	0

#	Date	Venue	Opponent	Result	Competition
1	8 June 2022	Salt Lake Stadium, Kolkata, India	Afghanistan	2–1	2023 AFC Asian Cup qualification – third round
2	11 June 2022	Salt Lake Stadium, Kolkata, India	Cambodia	3–0	2023 AFC Asian Cup qualification – third round
3	14 June 2022	Salt Lake Stadium, Kolkata, India	India	0–4	2023 AFC Asian Cup qualification – third round
4	19 July 2022	Kashima Stadium, Kashima, Japan	Japan	0–6	2022 EAFF E-1 Football Championship
5	24 July 2022	Toyota Stadium, Toyota, Japan	South Korea	0–3	2022 EAFF E-1 Football Championship
6	27 July 2022	Toyota Stadium, Toyota, Japan	China	0–1	2022 EAFF E-1 Football Championship
7	21 September 2022	Mong Kok Stadium, Mong Kok, Hong Kong	Myanmar	2–0	Friendly
8	24 September 2022	Hong Kong Stadium, Hong Kong	Myanmar	0–0	Friendly

== Honours ==
=== Club ===
South China

- Hong Kong First Division: 2012–13
- Hong Kong Senior Shield: 2013–14
