= Pedrabranca Futebol Clube =

Defunct association football club in Brazil

Pedrabranca
- Full name: Pedrabranca Futebol Clube
- Founded: April 9, 2001 (as RS Futebol Clube); August 8, 2008 (as Pedrabranca Futebol Clube)
- Ground: Estádio Morada dos Quero-Queros, Alvorada, Rio Grande do Sul state, Brazil
- Capacity: 2,000
Home colors	Away colors

Pedrabranca Futebol Clube, also known as Pedrabranca, is a Brazilian football club based in Alvorada, Rio Grande do Sul. The club was formerly known as RS Futebol Clube. They competed in the Série C once. Thiago Silva began his career there.

== History ==
The club was founded on January 1, 2001, as RS Futebol Clube. They won the Campeonato Gaúcho Third Level in 2002. RS competed in the Série C in 2003, when the club was eliminated in the Fifth Stage by Ituano. RS Futebol Clube was renamed or refounded to/as Pedrabranca Futebol Clube on August 8, 2008.

== Honours ==
- Campeonato Gaúcho Série B
  - Runners-up (1): 2002

== Season records ==
- 2003: Second Level, eliminated in 2nd Stage
- 2004: Second Level, eliminated in 2nd Stage
- 2005: Second Level, eliminated in 1st Stage

== Stadium ==
Pedrabranca play their home games at Estádio Morada dos Quero-Queros. The stadium has a maximum capacity of 2,000 people.
