= Steven Lo =

Hong Kong businessman (born 1959)

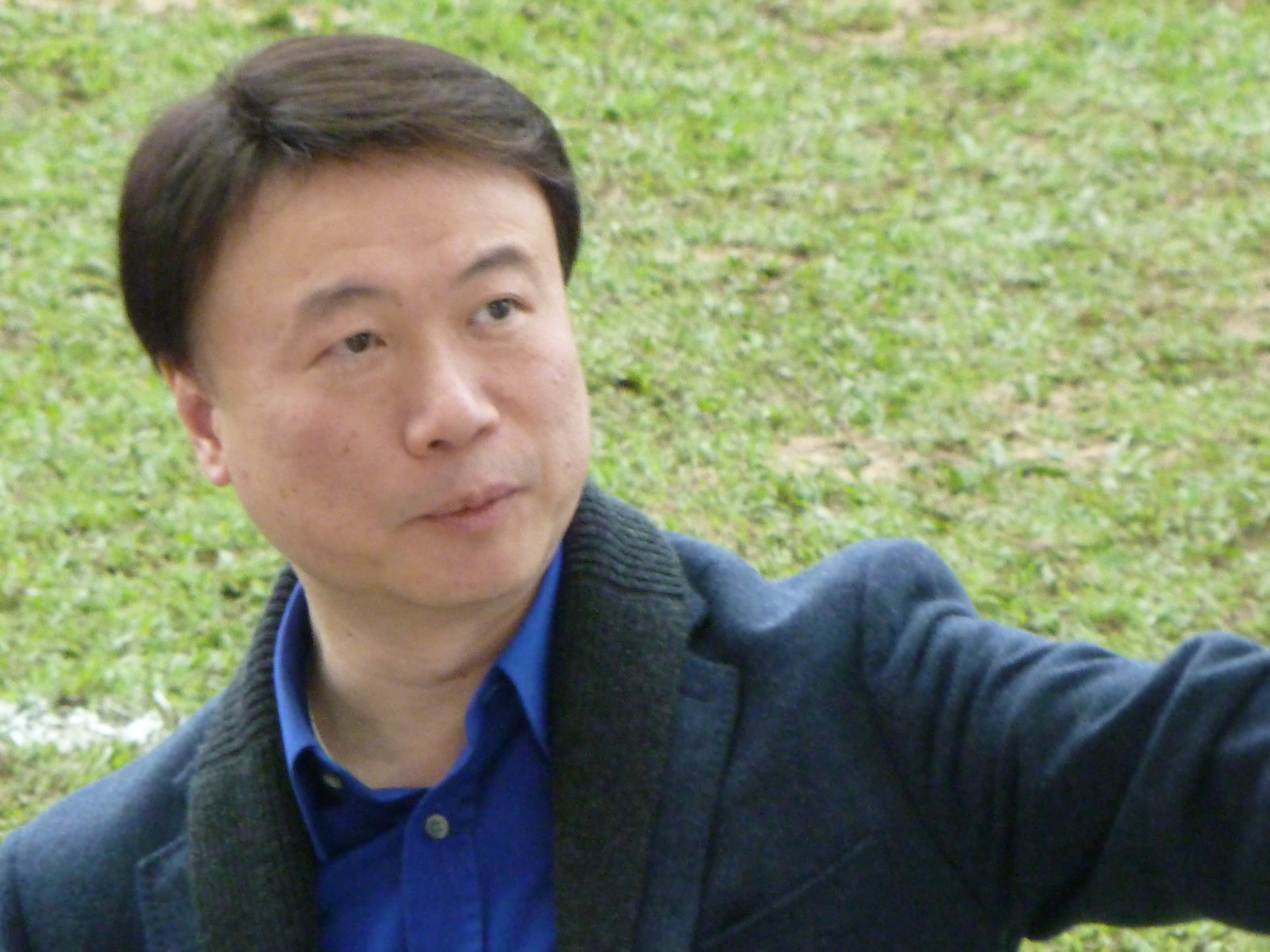
- Born: 8 June 1959 (age 67); Portuguese Macau
- Occupation: BMA Investment chairman
- Spouse: Canny Leung (2002-2018)

Steven Lo Kit-Sing
- Traditional Chinese: 羅傑承
- Simplified Chinese: 罗杰承
Transcriptions
Standard Mandarin
- Hanyu Pinyin: Luó Jié Chéng
- IPA: [lwǒ.tɕjě.ʈʂʰə̌ŋ]
Yue: Cantonese
- Jyutping: lo4 git6 sing4
- IPA: [lɔ˩.kit̚˨.sɪŋ˩]

Steven Lo Kit-Sing (Chinese: 羅傑承, born 8 June 1959) is a Hong Kong and Macanese businessman, investor, filmmaker, and philanthropist.

Born in Hong Kong, Steven Lo had his upbringing and education in Macau. After graduation from high school, he worked in a Portuguese bank and subsequently started up a European car dealership business, exclusively trading and selling brands like Volvo, Audi, Volkswagen, Porsche and Lancia. Since 1985, he had businesses and investments in real estate and food and beverage sectors and wholly owned and operated the only two department stores in Macau. Lo earned recognition as a young successful entrepreneur and was the President of the Junior Chamber of Commerce, Macao.

Lo returned to Hong Kong in the 1991 and was involved in a variety of investments primarily in the film production and cinema circuits but also real estate and financial projects. At the end of the 1990s, he established the entertainment company BMA Entertainment Holdings Limited with a wide variety of entertainment businesses including records, movie production and artist management. bma has since expanded into an investment company – bma Investment Group Limited, under which includes property development, finance services, large-scale performance, sports entertainment, books publication, marketing promotion and public relations services.

Steven Lo is active in the Hong Kong football scene since 2006. As the convener of South China's football team, he has overseen the winning of the Domestic Treble in the 2006–07 playing season. The team has won a record 40 First Division League titles and is one of the seven clubs in the world achieving this feat. In the 7 years management under Steven Lo, South China has won five league championships, and has reached the semi-finals of the 2009 AFC Cup.

Lo is the Vice-Chairman of the Hong Kong Football Association and served as an advisor and team manager for the Hong Kong Football Association at the 2009 East Asian Games where the Hong Kong football team became the first Hong Kong football to win gold in any major international sporting event.

== Early life and career ==
Steven Lo was born into the Vitasoy International Holdings Limited (SEHK: 0345) family whose founder Dr. Lo Kwee-seong, CBE, JP was Lo's grandfather's younger brother. The former is also the nephew of Lo Hoi-Muk, founder of the Cafe de Coral Group (SEHK: 0341). Born in Hong Kong, Lo's family relocated to Macau when his father was appointed to manage Vitasoy's business in Macau. Lo was brought up and educated in Macau.

During his adolescence, Lo was interested in football and music. When he was in form two in the secondary school, he organised a concert for Sam Hui, and formed the fans club in Macau. He eventually went on to organising other concerts in Macau for acts such as The Wynners, Louie Castro and Rowena Cortes.

After graduation, he began his career in the banking industry. He consequently established a car dealership, and was also involved in real estate businesses. At the dawn of the 1990s, Lo began investing in the Hong Kong film production and cinema circuits that owned more than 30 cinema theatres.

== BMA ==
Steven Lo established BMA Entertainment Holdings Ltd in 1998. Its businesses included records, movie production and artist management.

=== BMA Investment ===
Under the leadership of Lo, BMA's businesses has broadened into investments in property development, finance services, large-scale performance, sports entertainment, books publication, marketing, promotion and public relations in Hong Kong and Macau.

=== BMA Entertainment ===
BMA Entertainment, is involved in diversified entertainment categories such as album and artist management, motion pictures production, publishing, events and concert organisation. Its most notable artists have included Niki Chow, Jade Kwan, Soler, Endy Chow, Gary Chaw, Gin Lee and Bianca Wu.

=== BMA Sports ===
In 2008, bma Sports was established to deal with football team business. bma Sports manages players' commercial rights, organise football events, and is a sponsor to South China Football Team.

=== BMA Catering Management ===
Steven Lo has spread his interest in local and international cuisine. Under the management of bma Catering, Lo created highly acclaimed brands in town including the party concept RedMR and retro-themed Loyal Dining and previously Hong Kong Dai Pai Dong. In 2011 He would open up The Tonno, an expansive entertainment offering with Tonno Bar, Tonno Club, RedMR, Shanghainese cuisine Shanghai Lo and Italian pasta café Tonno Kitchen.

== Personal life ==
Steven Lo was married to author Canny Leung on 13 February 2002 in Las Vegas. They have a daughter. The pair met while working together on the film Bakery Amour in 2000.

The pair separated in late 2017. Their divorce was finalized on 14 February 2018.

== Horse owner ==
Steven Lo is also a prominent horse owner in Hong Kong, with many horses under his name. One of his horses, Military Attack, trained by John Moore, was crowned the 2012–13 Horse of the Year by Hong Kong Jockey Club. Having won 5 Cup races including International Group 1 races of Singapore Airlines International Cup, The Audemars Piguet QEII Cup, and the Citibank HK Gold Cup, Military Attack's total stakes in Hong Kong was HKD$29,846,000. Xtension, also trained by John Moore, won a 2-in-a-row BMW Champions Mile in 2011 and 2012, had a total stakes of HKD$28,795,400. Another of his horses, Military Move, won the 134th running of the New Zealand Derby in 2010, trained by Shaune Ritchie. Aided by a magnificent ride by Michael Walker, he opened up a big break early in the home straight and determinedly held off all challengers to record an upset victory in New Zealand's richest race. Steven Lo also owns horses in Australia, New Zealand, France, Ireland and Singapore.

== Legal Case ==
Consequential to former Secretary for Transports and Public Works Ao Man-long's founded guilty for bribery in 2008 by Macau High Court, a substantial number of projects commenced in the term of service of Ao Man-long from 2000 to 2006 were brought to cases by the Macau Commission Against Corruption (CCAC). Hong Kong tycoons Joseph Lau Luen-hung and Steven Lo were implicated in the case of offering Macau's former Secretary for Transports and Public Works Ao Man-long HK$20 million over the bid in 2005 for five plots of land opposite Macau International Airport. Lau and Lo both denied the accusation of bribery and Lo earlier told the court that the HK$20 million was a preliminary payment to the construction company of San Meng Fai.
