= 2011–12 Kitchee SC season =

Kitchee SC
2011–12 season
- General Manager: Ken Ng
- Head Coach: Josep Gombau
- Home ground: Tseung Kwan O Sports Ground
- League: 2nd
- Senior Shield: 1st round
- FA Cup: N/A (Not Begin)
- League Cup: N/A (Not Begin)
- AFC Cup: N/A (Not Begin)
- Top goalscorer: League: Roberto (7 goals); All: Roberto (7 goals)
- Highest home attendance: 1,697 (3 December vs Sunray Cave JC Sun Hei, First Division League)
- Lowest home attendance: 481 (25 September vs Hong Kong Sapling, First Division League)
- Average home league attendance: 1,045
Home colours	Away colours

This article records the 2011–2012 season for the Kitchee Sports Club, a Hong Kong soccer club.

== Squad ==
=== First Team Squad ===
As of 5 February 2012

Note: Flags indicate national team as defined under FIFA eligibility rules; some limited exceptions apply. Players may hold more than one non-FIFA nationality.

No.	Pos.	Nation	Player
1	GK	HKG	Wang Zhenpeng
2	MF	ESP	Fernando Recio
3	DF	ESP	Dani Cancela
5	MF	PAK	Zesh Rehman
6	MF	HKG	Gao Wen
7	FW	HKG	Chu Siu Kei (1st vice-captain)
8	MF	HKG	Ngan Lok Fung
9	FW	CHN	Liang Zicheng
10	MF	HKG	Lam Ka Wai
11	FW	ESP	Yago
12	MF	HKG	Lo Kwan Yee
13	FW	HKG	Chan Man Fai

No.	Pos.	Nation	Player
14	DF	HKG	Liu Quankun
16	MF	ESP	Jose Maria Diaz Munoz
17	GK	HKG	Li Jian
18	FW	ESP	Jordi Tarrés
19	MF	CHN	Huang Yang
20	FW	ESP	Roberto Losada (captain)
21	DF	HKG	Tsang Kam To
22	MF	HKG	Lo Chi Kwan
23	GK	CHN	Guo Jianqiao
26	FW	HKG	Chao Pengfei (On Loan from Biu Chun Rangers)
30	MF	HKG	Leung Ka Hai
—	DF	CAN	Landon Ling

=== On loan ===
Note: Flags indicate national team as defined under FIFA eligibility rules; some limited exceptions apply. Players may hold more than one non-FIFA nationality.

No.	Pos.	Nation	Player
28	MF	HKG	Li Ka Chun (at TSW Pegasus)
11	DF	HKG	Tsang Chi Hau (at Hong Kong Sapling)
29	FW	HKG	Chan Ho Fung (at Tai Chung)
—	DF	HKG	Li Ngai Hoi (at Hong Kong Sapling)

No.	Pos.	Nation	Player
27	FW	HKG	Tsang Kin Fong (at Hong Kong Sapling)
—	GK	HKG	Wong Tsz Him (at Hong Kong Sapling)
28	MF	CHN	Su Yang (at Hong Kong Sapling)

== Stats ==
=== Squad Stats ===
	League	Challenge Shield	League Cup	FA Cup	AFC Cup	Total Stats
Games played	11	2	0	0	0	13
Games won	8	0	0	0	0	8
Games drawn	2	1	0	0	0	3
Games lost	1	1	0	0	0	2
Goals for	27	1	0	0	0	28
Goals against	12	2	0	0	0	14
Players used	23	16	0	0	0	19^{1}
Yellow cards	21	11	0	0	0	32
Red cards	1	1	0	0	0	2

Last updated: 3 January 2012
Source: HKFA

Players Used: Kitchee has used a total of 23 different players in all competitions.

=== Player Stats ===
				Total				First Division League		Senior Challenge Shield		FA Cup		League Cup		AFC Cup		
N	Pos.	Name	Nat.	GS	App	Gls	Min	App	Gls	App	Gls	App	Gls	App	Gls	App	Gls	Notes
1	GK	Wang Zhenpeng	(Hong Kong)	13	13	-14	1170	11	-12	2	-2							(−) GA
17	GK	Li Jian	(China)															(−) GA
23	GK	Guo Jianqiao	(China)															(−) GA
2	CB	Recio	(Spain)	11	12		993	10		2								
3	FB	Dani	(Spain)	10	10		879	9		1								
5	CB	Rehman	(Pakistan)	2	2		152	2										Joined in January 2012
14	CB	Liu Quankun	(Hong Kong)	6	10		565	8		2								
21	RB	Tsang Kam To	(Hong Kong)	2	6	1	222	5	1	1								
—	LB	Landon Lloyd Ling	(Canada)															
	CB	Michael	(North Macedonia)	5	8		465	6		2								Released by club in January 2012
	CB	Luzardo	(Spain)	8	10	3	749	8	3	2								Contract terminated in January 2012
6	CM	Gao Wen	(China)	8	8		673	7		1								
7	MF	Chu Siu Kei	(Hong Kong)	11	12		797	11		1								
8	CM	Ngan Lok Fung	(Hong Kong)	1	2		90	2										
10	CM	Lam Ka Wai	(Hong Kong)	4	5		296	5										
12	CM	Lo Kwan Yee	(Hong Kong)	11	13	1	1050	11	1	2								
16	DM	Diaz	(Spain)	1	2	1	115	2	1									Joined in January 2012
19	CM	Huang Yang	(China)	10	13	1	926	11	1	2								
22	RM	Lo Chi Kwan	(Hong Kong)	2	9	4	332	7	4	2								
28	CM	Su Yang	(China)		1		13	1										On loan to Hong Kong Sapling in January 2012
	RM	James Ha	(Hong Kong)															
9	FW	Liang Zicheng	(China)	11	12	2	840	10	2	2								
11	FW	Yago	(Spain)	2	2	3	155	2	3									Joined in January 2012
13	SS	Chan Man Fai	(Hong Kong)	4	7	1	465	6	1	1								
18	SS	Jordi	(Spain)	11	12	5	1023	10	4	2	1							
20	FW	Roberto Losada	(Spain)	8	8	7	633	6	7	2								
26	CF	Chao Pengfei	(Hong Kong)		2		80	2										On loan from Biu Chun Rangers in January 2012

Last updated: 5 February 2012
Ordered by Position
0 shown as blank

=== Disciplinary record ===
Includes all competitive matches. The list is sorted by position, and then shirt number.

N	P	Nat.	Name	First Division League			Senior Challenge Shield			League Cup			FA Cup			AFC Cup			Total			Notes
N	P	Nat.	Name	Yellow card	Second yellow card	Red card	Yellow card	Second yellow card	Red card	Yellow card	Second yellow card	Red card	Yellow card	Second yellow card	Red card	Yellow card	Second yellow card	Red card	Yellow card	Second yellow card	Red card	Notes
1	GK	(Hong Kong)	Wang Zhenpeng																			
17	GK	(China)	Li Jian																			
23	GK	(China)	Guo Jianqiao																			
2	DF	(Spain)	Recio	4															4			
3	DF	(Spain)	Dani	3			1												4			
5	DF	(Pakistan)	Zesh Rehman																			
14	DF	(Hong Kong)	Liu Quankun	2		1	2												4		1	
21	DF	(Hong Kong)	Tsang Kam To																			
—	DF	(Canada)	Landon Lloyd Ling																			
	DF	(North Macedonia)	Michael	1			1												2			Released in January 2012
	DF	(Spain)	Luzardo	2			2												4			Contract terminated in January 2012
6	MF	(China)	Gao Wen																			
7	MF	(Hong Kong)	Chu Siu Kei	1			2												3			
8	MF	(Hong Kong)	Ngan Lok Fung																			
10	MF	(Hong Kong)	Lam Ka Wai																			
12	MF	(Hong Kong)	Lo Kwan Yee	1															1			
16	MF	(Spain)	Diaz																			Joined in January 2012
19	MF	(China)	Huang Yang	2			1												3			
22	MF	(Hong Kong)	Lo Chi Kwan																			
28	MF	(China)	Su Yang				1												1			On loan to Hong Kong Sapling
	MF	(Hong Kong)	James Ha																			
9	FW	(China)	Liang Zicheng	1															1			
11	FW	(Spain)	Yago						1												1	Joined in January 2012
13	FW	(Hong Kong)	Chan Man Fai						1												1	
18	FW	(Spain)	Jordi	2															2			
20	FW	(Spain)	Roberto	1															1			
26	FW	(Hong Kong)	Chao Pengfei	1															1			Joined in January 2012, got 1 yellow card before he joined Kitchee

Last updated: 5 February 2012
Source: HKFA
Only competitive matches
Ordered by (red card) , (second yellow card) and (yellow card)
(yellow card) = Number of bookings; (second yellow card) = Number of sending offs after a second yellow card; (red card) = Number of sending offs by a direct red card.

== Competitions ==
=== Overall ===
Competition	Started round	Current position / round	Final position / round	First match	Last match
First Division	—	1	1	13 August 2011	
Senior Challenge Shield	First round	—	First round	1 October 2011	6 December 2011
FA Cup	—	—	Final		
League Cup	Quarter-final	Quarter-final	Final	26 February 2012	
AFC Cup	—	—		6 March 2012	

Updated to match played 4 January 2012
Source: Competitions

=== First Division League ===
==== Classification ====
Pos	Team	Pld	W	D	L	GF	GA	GD	Pts	Qualification or relegation
1	Kitchee	18	13	3	2	44	20	+24	42	2013 AFC Cup Group stage
2	TSW Pegasus	18	12	2	4	48	26	+22	38	
3	South China	18	10	6	2	47	17	+30	36	
4	Sunray Cave JC Sun Hei	18	8	4	6	29	22	+7	28	2013 AFC Cup Group stage (Note: via 2011–12 Hong Kong Senior Challenge Shield)
5	Citizen	18	5	8	5	29	31	−2	23	

Updated to match(es) played on 20 May 2012. Source:
Rules for classification: 1) points; 2) head-to-head points; 3) head-to-head goal difference; 4) head-to-head goals scored; 5) goal difference; 6) number of goals scored.

==== Results summary ====
Overall								Home						Away					
Pld	W	D	L	GF	GA	GD	Pts	W	D	L	GF	GA	GD	W	D	L	GF	GA	GD
18	14	3	1	45	19	+26	45	7	2	0	25	9	+16	7	1	1	20	10	+10

Last updated: 20 May 2012.

==== Results by round ====
Round	1	2	3	4	5	6	7	8	9	10	11	12	13	14	15	16	17	18
Ground	H	H	H	A	H	A	A	A	A	A	A	A	H	H	A	H	H	H
Result	D	W	W	W	W	D	W	L	W	W	L	W	W	D	W	W	W	W
Position	5	2	2	1	1	1	2	3	2	1	2	2	2	2	2	1	1	1

Updated to match(es) played on 20 May 2012. Source:
A = Away; H = Home; W = Win; D = Draw; L = Loss

== Fixtures and Results ==
=== Pre-season ===
==== Barclays Asia Trophy ====
27 July 2011 Semi-Final	Kitchee (Hong Kong)	0 – 4	(England) Chelsea	So Kon Po, Hong Kong
20:30 (GMT+8)		Report(Chelsea); Report(HKFA)	Lampard 38' (pen.); Luzardo 50' (o.g.); Drogba 61'; Sturridge 78'	Stadium: Hong Kong Stadium; Attendance: 33,967; Referee: Phil Dowd

31 July 2011 3rd and 4th play-off	Kitchee (Hong Kong)	0 – 3	(England) Blackburn Rovers	So Kon Po, Hong Kong
18:00 (GMT+8)		Report	Formica 35'; Dunn 70'; Blackman 86' (pen.)	Stadium: Hong Kong Stadium; Attendance: 38,911; Referee: Phil Dowd

==== Friendlies ====
23 July 2011	Guangdong Sunray Cave (China)	2 – 1	(Hong Kong) Kitchee	Guangdong, China
	20'; 45'		30' Huang Yang

13 August 2011	U.E. Remolins Bitem (Spain)	2 – 1	(Hong Kong) Kitchee	Spain
	Goal		Goal

15 August 2011	CF Amposta (Spain)	0 – 1	(Hong Kong) Kitchee	Spain
			Su Yang

17 August 2011	RCD Espanyol B (Spain)	1 – 2	(Hong Kong) Kitchee	Spain
		Goal	Lo Kwan Yee; Roberto Losada

19 August 2011	Villarreal CF B (Spain)	2 – 2	(Hong Kong) Kitchee	Spain
	Goal		James Ha; Roberto Losada

27 August 2011	Kitchee (Hong Kong)	1 – 0	Hong Kong Sapling	Hong Kong
	Roberto Losada

=== First Division League ===
3 September 2011 Week 1	Kitchee (Hong Kong)	1 – 1	(Hong Kong) Sunray Cave JC Sun Hei	Tseung Kwan O, Hong Kong
17:00(GMT+8)	Roberto 47' (pen.)W	Report	20' Leung Tsz Chun; (yellow card) 47' Kilama; (yellow card) 84' Sealy; (yellow card) 85' Cheng Siu Wai; (yellow card) 90' Li Ming; (yellow card) 90' Cordeiro	Stadium: Tseung Kwan O Sports Ground (Capatity:3,500); Attendance: 1,697; Referee: Liu Man Fai; Assistant referees: Chan Shui Hung; Chung Ming Sang; Fourth official: Ho Wai Sing

18 September 2011 Week 2	Kitchee (Hong Kong)	4 – 2	(Hong Kong) Wofoo Tai Po	Tseung Kwan O, Hong Kong
17:30(GMT+8)	Chu Siu Kei (yellow card) 37'; Roberto 61', 65'; Recio (yellow card) 72'; Luzardo 75'; Huang Yang 82' (yellow card) 89'; Jordi (yellow card) 88'		(yellow card) 45' Ye Jia; (yellow card) 50' Kwok Wing Sun; 59', 70' Christian Annan; (yellow card) 72' Lima; (yellow card) 79' Sze Kin Wai; (yellow card) 86' Chan Yuk Chi	Stadium: Tseung Kwan O Sports Ground (Capacity:3,500); Attendance: 1,113; Referee: Ng Chiu Kok; Assistant referees: Chow Chun Kit; Lui Siu Chuen; Fourth official: Lam Chi Ho

25 September 2011 Week 3	Kitchee (Hong Kong)	6 – 0	Hong Kong Sapling	Tseung Kwan O, Hong Kong
17:30(GMT+8)	Lo Kwan Yee (yellow card) 44'; Recio (yellow card) 61'; Roberto Losada 67'; Jordi 73'; Lo Chi Kwan 75', 85', 90'; Chan Man Fai 87'	Report	(yellow card) 8' Chan Cham Hei; (yellow card) 86' (yellow-red card) 88' Li Shu Yeung	Stadium: Tseung Kwan O Sports Ground (Capacity:3,500); Attendance: 481; Referee: Pau Sai Yin; Assistant referees: Tong Kui Sum; Ho Wai Sing; Fourth official: Lui Siu Chuen

15 October 2011 Week 4	Tuen Mun (Hong Kong)	0 – 1	(Hong Kong) Kitchee	Tuen Mun, Hong Kong
14:30(GMT+8)	Chan Hin Kwong (yellow card) 18' (yellow-red card) 66'; Bhengu (yellow card) 45'; Law Ka Lok (yellow card) 86'	Report	(yellow card) 31' Dani; (yellow card) 64' Recio; 84' Roberto	Stadium: Tuen Mun Tang Shiu Kin Sports Ground (Capacity:2,200); Attendance: 1042; Referee: Liu Kwok Man; Assistant referees: Pau Sai Yin; Poon Ming Fai; Fourth official: Ng Chin Pang

23 October 2011 Week 5	Kitchee (Hong Kong)	3 – 2	(Hong Kong) TSW Pegasus	Tseung Kwan O, Hong Kong
17:30(GMT+8)	Luzardo 22', 83' (yellow card) 26'; Dani (yellow card) 67'; Tsang Kam To 86'	Report	(yellow card) 13' Lau Nim Yat; 29' Itaparica; (yellow card) 42' Godfred; (yellow card) 64' Dodd; 69' McKee; (yellow card) 72' Chan Ming Kong; (yellow card) 90' Fan Qunxiao	Stadium: Tseung Kwan O Sports Ground (Capacity:3,500); Attendance: 1,017; Referee: Cheng Oi Cho; Assistant referees: Lam Chi Ho; Ho Wai Sing; Fourth official: Yu Chun San

20 November 2011 Week 6	Citizen (Hong Kong)	0 – 0	(Hong Kong) Kitchee	Mong Kok, Hong Kong
14:30(GMT+8)	Festus (yellow card) 5'; Wong Yiu Fu (yellow card) 66'; Chan Man Chun (yellow card) 82'	Report	(yellow card) 45' Huang Yang; (yellow card) 82' Michael	Stadium: Mong Kok Stadium (Capacity:6,680); Attendance: 1,722; Referee: Tong Kui Sum; Assistant referees: Lam Shing Yan, Franky; Ho Wai Sing; Fourth official: Chan Shui Hung

4 December 2011 Week 7	Sham Shui Po (Hong Kong)	0 – 1	(Hong Kong) Kitchee	Sham Shui Po, Hong Kong
14:30(GMT+8)	Aender Naves Mesquita (yellow card) 22'; Poon Yiu Cheuk (yellow card) 50'; Leung Kwun Chung (yellow card) 59'; Lau Cheuk Hin (yellow card) 66'	Report	(yellow card) 58' Ubay Luzardo; 74' Lo Chi Kwan; (yellow card) 85' Liu Quankun	Stadium: Sham Shui Po Sports Ground (Capacity:2,194); Attendance: 992

18 December 2011 Week 8	South China (Hong Kong)	2 – 0	(Hong Kong) Kitchee	So Kon Po, Hong Kong
17:30(GMT+8)	Joel 43', 63' (pen.); Bai He (yellow card) 44'	Report	(yellow card) 62' Dani; (yellow card) 72' Liu Quankun	Stadium: Hong Kong Stadium (Capacity:40,000); Attendance: 3,979; Referee: Liu Kwok Man; Assistant referees: Chan Shui Hung; Poon Ming Fai; Fourth official: Chow Chun Kit

8 January 2012 Week 9	Biu Chun Rangers (Hong Kong)	2 – 6	(Hong Kong) Kitchee	Mong Kok, Hong Kong
14:30(GMT+8)	Ondoua 40'; Ip Chung Long (yellow card) 76'; Sandro 90' (pen.)	Report	9' (yellow card) 43' Roberto Losada; 29', 47' (yellow card) 36' Jordi; 65', 72' Liang Zicheng; 77' Lo Kwan Yee	Stadium: Mong Kok Stadium (Capacity:6,680); Attendance: 912; Referee: Ng Kai Lam; Assistant referees: Chow Chun Kit; Ho Wai Sing; Fourth official: Ng Chin Pang

3 February 2012 Week 10	Hong Kong Sapling	2 – 3	(Hong Kong) Kitchee	Kowloon Bay, Hong Kong
20:00(GMT+8)	Ramos 34' (yellow card) 57'; Yan Pak Long 81' (yellow card) 85'	Report	32' Diaz; 54', 82' Yago; (yellow card) 67' Liang Zicheng; (yellow card) 84' Recio; (red card) 90+1' Liu Quankun	Stadium: Kowloon Bay Park (Capacity:1,200); Attendance: 334; Referee: Liu Kwok Man; Assistant referees: Chan Shui Hung; Chung Ming Sang; Fourth official: Tang Hing Fu

12 February 2012 Week 11	TSW Pegasus (Hong Kong)	2 – 1	(Hong Kong) Kitchee	Yuen Long, Hong Kong
17:30(GMT+8)	Lau Nim Yat (yellow card) 26'; Mbome 52' (yellow card) 71'; Leandro Carrijo (yellow card) 58'; Dodd (yellow card) 74'; Santos Manoel (yellow card) 76'; Poon Yiu Cheuk (yellow card) 83'; Wang Zhenpeng 90' (o.g.)	Report	Daniel Cancela (yellow card) 33'; Yago 36'; Jorge Tarres (yellow card) 40'; Fernando Recio (yellow card) 60'; Chu Siu Kei (yellow card) 78'; Losada (yellow card) 78'	Stadium: Yuen Long Stadium (Capacity:4,932); Attendance: 2,376

3 March 2011 Week 12	Wofoo Tai Po (Hong Kong)	2 – 5	(Hong Kong) Kitchee	Tai Po, Hong Kong
14:30(GMT+8)	Afonso (yellow card) 11'; To Hon To 19'; William Carlos 41'; Annan (yellow card) 72'	Summary	Afonso 4' (o.g.); Lam Ka Wai 13'; Díaz José María (yellow card) 30'; Jorge Tarres 49' 54'; Losada 78'	Stadium: Tai Po Sports Ground (Capacity:3,000)

15 March 2012 Week 13	Kitchee (Hong Kong)	1 – 0	(Hong Kong) Sham Shui Po	Tseung Kwan O, Hong Kong
20:00(GMT+8)	Losada 18' (yellow card) 74'; Daniel Cancela (yellow card) 41'; Díaz José María (yellow card) 48'; Lang Zicheng (yellow card) 51'; Zeshan Rehman (yellow card) 68'	Report	Lee Ka Ho (yellow card) 30'	Stadium: Tseung Kwan O Sports Ground (Capacity:3,500); Attendance: 432

29 March 2012 Week 14	Kitchee (Hong Kong)	2 – 2	(Hong Kong) South China	Tseung Kwan O, Hong Kong
20:00(GMT+8)	Lam Ka Wai 13'; Yago 53'; Wang Zhenpeng (yellow card) 72'; Lo Kwan Yee (yellow card) 75'; Fernando Recio (yellow card) 85'; Losada (yellow card) 90'	Report	Bai He (yellow card) 40'; Chan Siu Ki (yellow card) 47'; Joel (yellow card) 55'; Giovane 73'; Dhiego Martins 87' (yellow card) 87'	Stadium: Tseung Kwan O Sports Ground (Capacity:3,500); Attendance: 2,751

29 January 2011 Week 15	Sunray Cave JC Sun Hei (Hong Kong)	1 – 2	(Hong Kong) Kitchee	Mong Kok, Hong Kong
14:30(GMT+8)	Barry 22'; Pak Wing Chak (yellow card) 27'; Leung Tsz Chun (yellow card) 46'; Pan Jia (yellow card) 54'	Report	27' Jordi; 44' Yago; (yellow card) 62' Chao Pengfei	Stadium: Mong Kok Stadium (Capacity:6,680); Attendance: 2,026; Referee: Ng Kai Lam; Assistant referees: Chow Chun Kit; Lam Chi Ho; Fourth official: Ng Chiu Kok

19 April 2012 Week 16	Kitchee (Hong Kong)	3 – 1	(Hong Kong) Citizen	Tseung Kwan O, Hong Kong
20:00(GMT+8)	Yago 41'; Chan Man Fai 66'; Liang Zicheng 90'	Summary	Baise (yellow card) 30' (yellow-red card) 90' (goal) 58'; Sham Kwok Fai (yellow card) 88'	Stadium: Tseung Kwan O Sports Ground (Capacity:3,500); Attendance: 558

3 May 2011 Week 17	Kitchee (Hong Kong)	1 – 0	(Hong Kong) Tuen Mun	Tseung Kwan O, Hong Kong
20:00(GMT+8)	Jordi Tarrés 49'	Summary	Teodorović (yellow card) 25'; Akosah (yellow card) 56'; Bamnjo (yellow card) 79'	Stadium: Tseung Kwan O Sports Ground (Capacity:3,500); Attendance: 670

20 May 2011 Week 18	Kitchee (Hong Kong)	4 – 1	(Hong Kong) Biu Chun Rangers	Tseung Kwan O, Hong Kong
17:30(GMT+8)	Liu Quankun (yellow card) 3'; Chan Man Fai 38' (yellow card) 68'; Tsang Kam To 39'; Jordi Tarrés 62'; Losada 82' (pen.); Chao Pengfei (yellow card) 83'	Report	Guy Junior (yellow card) 42'; Li Jian 55'; Michel de Buisson (yellow card) 81'	Stadium: Tseung Kwan O Sports Ground (Capacity:3,500); Attendance: 873

=== Senior Challenge Shield ===
==== First round ====
1 October 2011 1st leg	TSW Pegasus (Hong Kong)	1 – 1	(Hong Kong) Kitchee	Yuen Long
17:45	McKee 17'; Godfred (yellow card) 36'; Lau Nim Yat (yellow card) 64'; Takada (yellow card) 90'	Report	(yellow card) 14' Chu Siu Kei; (yellow card) 18' (yellow-red card) 79' Chan Man Fai; (yellow card) 40' Luzardo; (yellow card) 47' Liu Quankun; (yellow card) 54' Huang Yang; 72' Jordi; (yellow card) 77' Dani	Stadium: Yuen Long Stadium (Capacity:4,932); Attendance: 1,575; Referee: Ng Chiu Kok; Assistant referees: Chow Chun Kit; Ho Wai Sing; Fourth official: Ng Chin Pan

6 October 2011 2nd leg	Kitchee (Hong Kong)	0 – 1 (1 – 2 agg.)	(Hong Kong) TSW Pegasus	Tseung Kwan O
20:00(GMT+8)	Michael (yellow card) 58'; Luzardo (yellow card) 72'; Wang Zhenpang (yellow card) 79'; Chu Siu Kei (yellow card) 90'	Report	(yellow card) 6' Godfred; 19' McKee; (yellow card) 37' Cheung Kin Fung; (yellow card) 68' Chan Ming Kong; (yellow card) 90' Takada	Stadium: Tseung Kwan O Sports Ground (Capacity:3,500); Attendance: 921; Referee: Wong Chi Tang, Charlton; Assistant referees: Cheng Oi Cho; Lam Chi Ho; Fourth official: Lam Shing Yan, Franky

=== League Cup ===
==== Quarter-final ====
26 February 2012 Quarter-Final	Kitchee	2 – 1	Tuen Mun	Mong Kok
17:00(GMT+8)	39', 55' Roberto; (yellow card) 70' Roberto; (yellow card) 89' Ngan Lok Fung	Report	Beto (yellow card) 59'; Mirko 77'; Ip Kwok Hei (yellow card) 78'	Stadium: Mong Kok Stadium (Capacity:6,680); Attendance: 1,829; Referee: Liu Kwok Man; Assistant referees: Tong Kui Sum; Chung Ming Sang; Fourth official: Ho Wai Sing

10 March 2012 Semi-Final	South China	1 – 4 (a.e.t.)	Kitchee	Mong Kok
14:30(GMT+8)	Lo Kwan Yee (yellow card) 36'; Zhang Chunhui (yellow card) 47'; Joel 57'; Giovane 60'; Kwok Kin Pong (yellow card) 62'; Yapp Hung Fai (yellow card) 90'	Report	(yellow card) 36' Lo Kwan Yee; 48' (pen.), 120' Jordi; 99' Recio; 107' Liang Zicheng	Stadium: Mong Kok Stadium (Capacity:6,680); Attendance: 3,219; Referee: Tong Kui Sum; Assistant referees: Chan Shui Hung; Poon Ming Fai; Fourth official: Lam Chi Ho

15 April 2012 Final	TSW Pegasus	1 – 2	Kitchee	So Kon Po
17:00(GMT+8)	Santos Manoel (yellow card) 81'; Leandro Carrijó 90' (pen.)	Summary	Chu Siu Kei (yellow card) 32'; Yago 35'; Lo Kwan Yee (yellow card) 48' (goal) 61'; Chan Man Fai (yellow card) 80'; Tsang Kam To (yellow card) 88'	Stadium: Hong Kong Stadium (Capacity:40,000)

=== AFC Cup ===
==== Group-stage ====
6 March 2012 Group F	Kitchee (Hong Kong)	3 – 1	(Singapore) Tampines Rovers	Tseung Kwan O Sports Ground, Hong Kong
20:00 UTC+08:00	Liang Zicheng 3', 62'; Jordi 66'	Report	Ali 20'	Attendance: 1,314; Referee: Sgt Win Cho (Myanmar)

20 March 2012 Group F	Terengganu (Malaysia)	0 – 2	(Hong Kong) Kitchee	Sultan Ismail Nasiruddin Shah Stadium, Kuala Terengganu
16:45 UTC+08:00		Report	Tarrés 44'; Chu Siu Kei 75'	Attendance: 6,500; Referee: Yu Ming-hsun (Chinese Taipei)

4 April 2012 Group F	Kitchee (Hong Kong)	2 – 0	(Vietnam) Sông Lam Nghệ An	Tseung Kwan O Sports Ground, Hong Kong
17:00 UTC+08:00	Rehman 11'; Chu Siu Kei 73'	Report		Attendance: 1,760; Referee: (United Arab Emirates) Mohammed Abdulla Hassan Mohamed

10 April 2012 Group F	Sông Lam Nghệ An (Vietnam)	1 – 0	(Hong Kong) Kitchee	Vinh Stadium, Vinh
16:00 UTC+07:00

25 April 2012 Group F	Tampines Rovers (Singapore)	0 – 0	(Hong Kong) Kitchee	Jalan Besar Stadium, Singapore
19:30 UTC+08:00	Croissant (yellow card) 42'; Fahmie (yellow card) 71'	Summary	Liu Quankun (yellow card) 41'; Tsang Kam To (yellow card) 60'	Attendance: 710; Referee: (Sri Lanka) Dilan Perera

9 May 2012 Group F	Kitchee (Hong Kong)	2 – 2	(Malaysia) Terengganu	Tseung Kwan O Sports Ground, Hong Kong
20:00 UTC+08:00	Chan Man Fai (yellow card) 3'; Jordi Tarrés 9', 45'; Fernando Recio (yellow card) 68'	Report	Shamsuddin 14'; Biano (yellow card) 33'; Mohmad (yellow card) 54'; Yahya 70' (pen.)	Attendance: 1,179; Referee: (Thailand) Chaiya Mahapab

==== Last 16 ====
23 May 2012 Last 16	Kitchee (Hong Kong)	0 – 2	(Indonesia) Arema FC	Tseung Kwan O Sports Ground, Hong Kong
21:00 UTC+08:00		Report	Putut Waringin Jati 32'; Irfan Raditya 53'
