= 2015 Hong Kong Community Cup =

Kitchee	South China
0	2
- Date: 20 September 2015
- Venue: Mong Kok Stadium, Mong Kok
- Referee: Ng Chiu Kok
- Attendance: 4,226
- Weather: Clear; 30 °C (86 °F)

The 2015 Hong Kong Community Cup was the 2nd Hong Kong Community Cup, an annual Hong Kong football match played between the winners of the previous season's Premier League and Season play-offs. The match was contested by Kitchee, the 2014–15 Hong Kong Premier League winners, and South China, champions of the 2014–15 Hong Kong season play-off. It was held at Mong Kok Stadium on 20 September 2015.

== Match details ==
20 September 2015
17:30 UTC+8

Kitchee	0–2	South China
	Report	Itaparica 32'; Sean Tse 72'

Mong Kok Stadium, Hong Kong
Attendance: 4,226
Referee: Ng Chiu Kok

Kitchee	South China

KITCHEE:
GK	1	(Hong Kong) Wang Zhenpeng
RB	12	(Hong Kong) Lo Kwan Yee (c)
CB	2	(Spain) Fernando Recio
CB	5	(Brazil) Hélio José de Souza Gonçalves
LB	3	(Spain) Dani Cancela	(substituted off) 73'
DM	19	(Hong Kong) Huang Yang
DM	20	(Hong Kong) Matt Lam
AM	10	(Hong Kong) Lam Ka Wai	(substituted off) 60'
RW	7	(Brazil) Fernando	(substituted off) 60'
LW	18	(Spain) Jordi Tarrés
ST	11	(Brazil) Alessandro Leonardo
Substitutes:
GK	23	(Hong Kong) Guo Jianqiao
DF	6	(Hong Kong) Gao Wen
FW	8	(Hong Kong) Alex Tayo Akande	(substituted on) 60'
FW	9	(Spain) Juan Belencoso	(substituted on) 60'
DF	13	(Hong Kong) Li Ngai Hoi	(substituted on) 73'
MF	15	(Hong Kong) Christian Annan
DF	44	(South Korea) Kim Tae-min
Coach:
(Spain) Abraham García

SOUTH CHINA:
GK	12	(Ecuador) Cristian Mora
RB	2	(Hong Kong) Jack Sealy
CB	22	(Spain) Bojan Mališić	(yellow card) 80'
CB	4	(Hong Kong) Sean Tse
LB	13	(Hong Kong) Cheung Kin Fung		(substituted off) 85'
DM	6	(Hong Kong) Andy Russell	(yellow card) 49'
CM	10	(Brazil) Luiz Carlos Vieira	(yellow card) 22'	(substituted off) 90+2'
RM	17	(Hong Kong) Leung Chun Pong
AM	11	(Brazil) Itaparica
LM	7	(Hong Kong) Chan Siu Ki (c)	(yellow card) 64'
ST	9	(Brazil) Lucas Espíndola da Silva	(yellow card) 37'
Substitutes:
GK	1	(Hong Kong) Leung Hing Kit
DF	5	(Hong Kong) Chak Ting Fung
DF	23	(Hong Kong) Che Runqiu		(substituted on) 85'
MF	27	(Hong Kong) Lai Yiu Cheong
FW	28	(Hong Kong) Liang Zicheng		(substituted on) 90+2'
DF	76	(Hong Kong) Cheung Chi Yung
FW	90	(Hong Kong) Lam Hok Hei
Coach:
(Brazil) Casemiro Mior

MATCH OFFICIALS

- Assistant referees:
  - Lam Nai Kei
  - Fok Pong Shing
- Fourth official: Ho Wai Sing

MATCH RULES

- 90 minutes.
- Penalty shoot-out if necessary..
- Twelve named substitutes.
- No maximum number of substitutions.

== See also ==
- 2015–16 Hong Kong Premier League
