= Frank McKee =

Scottish footballer

Personal information
- Full name: Francis Joseph McKee
- Date of birth: 25 January 1923
- Place of birth: Cowdenbeath, Scotland
- Date of death: 24 July 1988 (aged 65)
- Place of death: Slough, England
- Position: Half back

Senior career*
Years	Team	Apps	(Gls)
- Lochgelly Albert
>–1947	Dundee United	18	(0)
1948–1952	Birmingham City	22	(0)
1952–1956	Gillingham	53	(0)
1956–1957	Gloucester City		
1957–?	Kidderminster Harriers		
- * Club domestic league appearances and goals

Francis Joseph McKee (25 January 1923 – 24 July 1988) was a Scottish professional footballer who played as a half-back. He played in the Scottish League for Dundee United in the 1947–48 season, and in the English Football League for Birmingham City and Gillingham between 1948 and 1955. He began his career with junior club Lochgelly Albert, and went on to play for Southern League clubs Gloucester City, for whom he scored once in 26 appearances, and Kidderminster Harriers. After retiring from football he worked for South Staffordshire Water.

His grandson Jaimes was also a footballer and represented Hong Kong at international level.
