= 2011–12 Hong Kong League Cup =

Tournament details
- Country: Hong Kong
- Teams: 10

Final positions
- Champions: Kitchee (3rd title)
- Runners-up: TSW Pegasus

Tournament statistics
- Matches played: 9
- Goals scored: 29 (3.22 per match)
- Attendance: 19,236 (2,137 per match)
- Top goal scorer(s): (Hong Kong) Jaimes McKee (TSW Pegasus); 5 goals

Awards
- Best player: (Hong Kong) Lo Kwan Yee (Kitchee)

The 2011–12 Hong Kong League Cup is the 11th edition of the Hong Kong League Cup. It is a knockout competition for all the teams of the 2011–12 Hong Kong First Division League.

Originally it would begin in October 2011, and will end in April 2012. However, due to lack of sponsorship, it was postponed to start in January 2012 after Halewinner Limited were announced as sponsors.

== Calendar ==
Stage	Round	Seeds Confirmed	Date	Matches	Clubs
Knockout	First Round	8 January 2012	14 January 2012	2	10 → 8
Knockout	Quarter-finals	8 January 2012	25 February 2012 – 26 February 2012	4	8 → 4
Knockout	Semi-finals	8 January 2012	10 March 2012 – 11 March 2012	2	4 → 2
Knockout	Final	8 January 2012	15 April 2012 at Hong Kong Stadium	1	2 → 1

== Bracket ==
First Round
Hong Kong Sapling	0
Sham Shui Po	1
Biu Chun Rangers	0 (4)
Tuen Mun (pen.)	0 (5)

Quarterfinals
Sunray Cave JC Sun Hei	0
Citizen	1
TSW Pegasus (a.e.t.)	4
Sham Shui Po	1
South China	4
Wofoo Tai Po	2
Kitchee	2
Tuen Mun	1

Semifinals
Citizen	1
TSW Pegasus	4
South China	1
Kitchee (a.e.t.)	4

Final
TSW Pegasus	1
Kitchee	2

== Match Records ==
=== First round ===
14 January 2012 Round 1	Hong Kong Sapling	0 – 1	Sham Shui Po	Mong Kok
14:30(GMT+8)	Yuen Tsun Nam (yellow card) 44'; Li Shu Yeung (yellow card) 85'	Report	(yellow card) 14' Tsang Tsz Chung; 20' Fong Pak Lun	Stadium: Mong Kok Stadium (Capacity:6,680); Attendance: 1,035; Referee: Cheng Oi Cho; Assistant referees: Chen Shai Tsu; Lam Nai Kei; Fourth official: Lui Siu Chuen

14 January 2012 Round 1	Biu Chun Rangers	0 – 0 (a.e.t.) (4 – 5 p)	Tuen Mun	Mong Kok
17:00(GMT+8)	Moukoko (yellow card) 18' (yellow-red card) 108'; Liu Songwei (yellow card) 67'; Fan Weijun (yellow card) 77'	Report	(yellow card) 97' Bamnjo	Stadium: Mong Kok Stadium (Capacity:6,680); Attendance: 1,035; Referee: Tong Kui Sum; Assistant referees: Chow Chun Kit; Chung Ming Sang; Fourth official: Franky Lam Shing Yan
	Penalties
	Sandro (penalty scored); Ondoua (penalty missed); Li Jian (penalty scored); Leung Hing Kit (penalty scored); Fan Weijun (penalty scored)		(penalty scored) Cedomir; (penalty scored) Mirko; (penalty scored) Leung Kwok Wai; (penalty scored) Yip Tsz Chun; (penalty scored) Beto

=== Quarter-finals ===
25 February 2012 Quarter-Final	TSW Pegasus	4 – 1 (a.e.t.)	Sham Shui Po	Mong Kok
14:30(GMT+8)	Lee Hong Lim 2'; Chan Ming Kong (yellow card) 57'; McKee 92', 119', 120'; Lee Wai Lun (yellow card) 94'; McKee (yellow card) 117'	Report	40' Lee Ka Ho; (yellow card) 33' Aender; (yellow card) 90' Evans	Stadium: Mong Kok Stadium (Capacity:6,680); Attendance: 2,714; Referee: Pau Sai Yin; Assistant referees: Charlton Wong Chi Tang; Lam Nai Kei; Fourth official: Amarjit Singh Sarao

25 February 2012 Quarter-Final	South China	4 – 2	Wofoo Tai Po	Mong Kok
17:00(GMT+8)	Chan Wai Ho 5'; Cheng Lai Hin 31', 35'; Chan Siu Ki 54'; Au Yeung Yiu Chung (yellow card) 56'; Man Pei Tak (yellow card) 71'	Report	(yellow card) 70' Lui Chi Hing; 79' Clayton; 85' Gomes	Stadium: Mong Kok Stadium (Capacity:6,680); Attendance: 2,714; Referee: Cheng Oi Cho; Assistant referees: Chan Shui Hung; Lui Siu Chuen; Fourth official: Franky Lam Shing Yan

26 February 2012 Quarter-Final	Sunray Cave JC Sun Hei	0 – 1	Citizen	Mong Kok
14:30(GMT+8)	Cordeiro (yellow card) 35'	Report	65' (pen.) Festus; (yellow card) 67' Sham Kwok Keung	Stadium: Mong Kok Stadium (Capacity:6,680); Attendance: 1,829; Referee: Ng Chiu Kok; Assistant referees: Chow Chun Kit; Lam Chi Ho; Fourth official: Ng Kai Lam

26 February 2012 Quarter-Final	Kitchee	2 – 1	Tuen Mun	Mong Kok
17:00(GMT+8)	39', 55' Roberto; (yellow card) 70' Roberto; (yellow card) 89' Ngan Lok Fung	Report	Beto (yellow card) 59'; Mirko 77'; Ip Kwok Hei (yellow card) 78'	Stadium: Mong Kok Stadium (Capacity:6,680); Attendance: 1,829; Referee: Liu Kwok Man; Assistant referees: Tong Kui Sum; Chung Ming Sang; Fourth official: Ho Wai Sing

=== Semi-finals ===
10 March 2012 Semi-Final	South China	1 – 4 (a.e.t.)	Kitchee	Mong Kok
14:30(GMT+8)	Lo Kwan Yee (yellow card) 36'; Zhang Chunhui (yellow card) 47'; Joel 57'; Giovane 60'; Kwok Kin Pong (yellow card) 62'; Yapp Hung Fai (yellow card) 90'	Report	(yellow card) 36' Lo Kwan Yee; 48' (pen.), 120' Jordi; 99' Recio; 107' Liang Zicheng	Stadium: Mong Kok Stadium (Capacity:6,680); Attendance: 3,219; Referee: Tong Kui Sum; Assistant referees: Chan Shui Hung; Poon Ming Fai; Fourth official: Lam Chi Ho

11 March 2012 Semi-Final	TSW Pegasus	4 – 1	Citizen	Mong Kok
14:30(GMT+8)	Lee Hong Lim 10'; McKee 45', 53'; Lucas (yellow card) 63'; Carrijo 71'; Chan Ming Kong (yellow card) 74'	Report	(yellow card) 17' Sham Kwok Keung; (yellow card) 38' Festus; (yellow card) 55' Helio; 64' (pen.) Festus; (yellow card) 70' Wong Yiu Fu; (yellow card) 73' Sham Kwok Fai	Stadium: Mong Kok Stadium (Capacity:6,680); Attendance: 922; Referee: Ng Chiu Kok; Assistant referees: Liu Kwok Man; Lam Nai Kei; Fourth official: Ho Wai Sing

=== Final ===
15 April 2012 Final	TSW Pegasus	1 – 2	Kitchee	Mong Kok
17:00(GMT+8)	Carrijó 90' (pen.)	Report	35' Yago; 62' Lo Kwan Yee	Stadium: Mong Kok Stadium (Capacity:6,680); Attendance: 3,957; Referee: Ng Kai Lam; Man of the Match: Lo Kwan Yee (Kitchee)

TSW Pegasus	Kitchee

TSW Pegasus:
GK	27	(Japan) Hisanori Takada
RB	2	(Hong Kong) Lee Wai Lun
CB	35	(Hong Kong) Ng Wai Chiu
CB	4	(Hong Kong) Deng Jinghuang		(substituted off) 64'
LB	13	(Hong Kong) Cheung Kin Fung
DM	10	(Cameroon) Eugene Mbome
DM	16	(Hong Kong) Lau Nim Yat
AM	11	(Brazil) Itaparica (c)	(yellow card) 81'
RW	23	(Hong Kong) Jaimes McKee		(substituted off) 46'
CF	28	(Brazil) Leandro Carrijó
LW	17	(Hong Kong) Lee Hong Lim		(substituted off) 66'
Substitutes:
GK	30	(Hong Kong) Tsang Man Fai
DF	2	(Brazil) Lucas		(substituted on) 64'
DF	25	(Hong Kong) So Wai Chuen
DF	31	(Hong Kong) Poon Yiu Cheuk
MF	14	(Hong Kong) Chan Ming Kong
FW	9	(Hong Kong) Lau Ka Shing		(substituted on) 66'
FW	20	(Hong Kong) Godfred Karikari		(substituted on) 46'
Coach：
(Hong Kong) Chan Hiu Ming

KITCHEE:
GK	1	(Hong Kong) Wang Zhenpeng
RB	12	(Hong Kong) Lo Kwan Yee	(yellow card) 48'
CB	5	(Pakistan) Zesh Rehman
CB	2	(Spain) Fernando Recio
LB	3	(Spain) Dani Cancela
DM	16	(Spain) Diaz	(yellow card) 7'	(substituted off) 51'
CM	19	(Hong Kong) Huang Yang
CM	10	(Hong Kong) Lam Ka Wai
RW	7	(Hong Kong) Chu Siu Kei (c)	(yellow card) 32'
CF	11	(Spain) Yago González		(substituted off) 66'
LW	9	(Hong Kong) Liang Zicheng		(substituted off) 75'
Substitutes:
GK	23	(China) Guo Jianqiao
DF	14	(Hong Kong) Liu Quankun		(substituted on) 51'
DF	21	(Hong Kong) Tsang Kam To	(yellow card) 88'	(substituted on) 75'
MF	13	(Hong Kong) Chan Man Fai	(yellow card) 80'
MF	22	(Hong Kong) Lo Chi Kwan
FW	18	(Spain) Jordi Tarrés		(substituted on) 66'
FW	26	(Hong Kong) Chao Pengfei
Coach:
(Spain) Josep Gombau

MATCH OFFICIALS

- Assistant referees:
  - Chow Chun Kit
  - Cheng Oi Cho
- Fourth official: Liu Kwok Man

MATCH RULES

- 90 minutes.
- 30 minutes of extra-time if necessary.
- Penalty shoot-out if scores still level.
- Seven named substitutes
- Maximum of 3 substitutions.

== Scorers ==
The scorers in the 2011–12 Hong Kong League Cup are as follows:

5 goals

- (Hong Kong) Jaimes McKee (TSW Pegasus)

2 goals

- (Hong Kong) Lee Hong Lim (TSW Pegasus)
- (Brazil) Leandro Carrijo (TSW Pegasus)
- (Hong Kong) Cheng Lai Hin (South China)
- (Hong Kong) Lo Kwan Yee (Kitchee)
- (Spain) Roberto Losada (Kitchee)
- (Spain) Jordi Tarrés (Kitchee)
- (Nigeria) Festus Baise (Citizen)

1 goal

- (Hong Kong) Fong Pak Lun (Sham Shui Po)
- (Hong Kong) Lee Ka Ho (Sham Shui Po)
- (Hong Kong) Chan Wai Ho (South China)
- (Hong Kong) Chan Siu Ki (South China)
- (Brazil) Giovane (South China)
- (Brazil) William Gomes (Wofoo Tai Po)
- (Brazil) Clayton Afonso (Wofoo Tai Po)
- (Serbia) Mirko Teodorović (Tuen Mun)
- (Hong Kong) Liang Zicheng (Kitchee)
- (Spain) Fernando Recio (Kitchee)
- (Spain) Yago González (Kitchee)

== Prizes ==
Top Scorer Award	Player of the Tournament
(Hong Kong) Jaimes McKee (TSW Pegasus)	(Hong Kong) Lo Kwan Yee (Kitchee)
