= Hong Kong Community Cup =

Annual association football match in Hong Kong

- Founded: 2014
- Abolished: 2018
- Region: Hong Kong
- Teams: 2
- Last champions: Kitchee (2nd title)
- Most championships: Kitchee; South China (2 titles each)
- 2018 Hong Kong Community Cup

Hong Kong Community Cup (Chinese: 香港社區盃), formerly known as Hong Kong Community Shield (Chinese: 香港慈善盾), was a football super cup competition in Hong Kong played between the winners of the Hong Kong Premier League (previously the Hong Kong First Division League) and the Hong Kong FA Cup (previously the Hong Kong season play-offs). If the Premier League champions also won the FA Cup title, the FA Cup runners-up would be qualified for the Community Cup.

== Community Shield ==
The Community Shield was only held once in 2009.

- 2009: Kitchee 2–0 South China

== Community Cup ==
=== Key ===
†	Match decided by a penalty shootout after regular time (no extra time rules)
Italic ^{(CR)}	Joined as FA Cup runners-up

=== Results ===
Season	Premier League Champions	Score	Season play-offs Champions	Venue	Attendance	Reference
2014	Kitchee	0–2	South China	Mong Kok Stadium	5,082	
2015	Kitchee	0–2	South China	Mong Kok Stadium	4,226	
2016	Eastern	3–1	Kitchee	Mong Kok Stadium	4,425	
2017	Kitchee	2–1	Eastern	Mong Kok Stadium	3,486	
Season	Premier League Champions	Score	FA Cup Champions	Venue	Attendance	Reference
2018	Kitchee	1–0	Tai Po ^{(CR)}	Mong Kok Stadium	3,074	
2019	Cancelled due to 2019–2020 Hong Kong protests					
2020	Cancelled due to COVID-19 pandemic in Hong Kong					

== Performance by clubs ==
Club	Winners	Last final won	Runners-up	Last final lost
Kitchee	2	2018	3	2016
South China	2	2015	0	–
Eastern	1	2016	1	2017
Tai Po	0	–	1	2018
