= Michael Cvetkovski =

Australian footballer

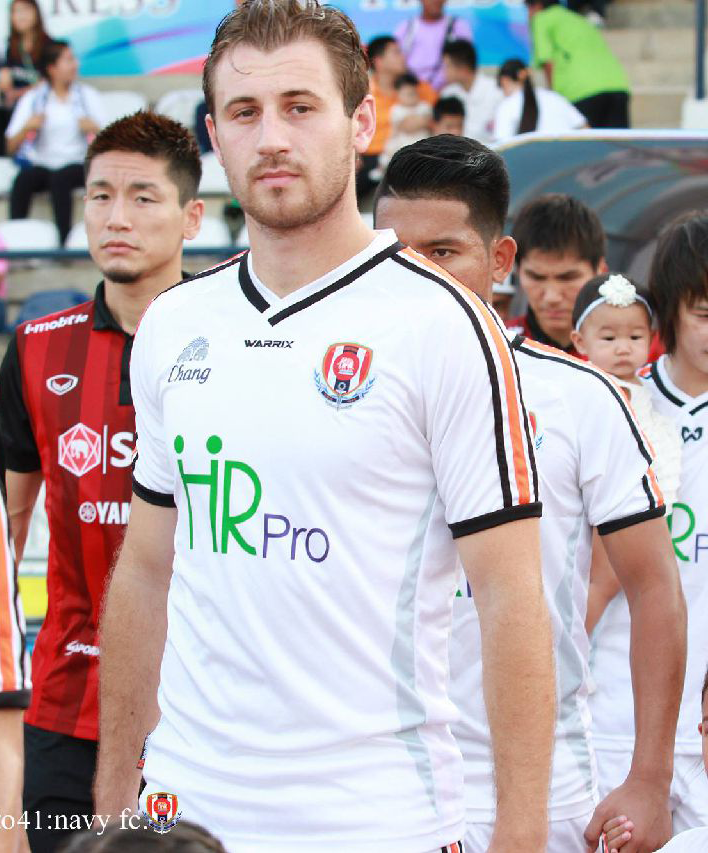
- Cvetkovski with Siam Navy in 2015

Personal information
- Full name: Michael Cvetkovski
- Date of birth: 21 November 1987 (age 38)
- Place of birth: Sydney, Australia
- Height: 1.90 m (6 ft 3 in)
- Position: Defender

Youth career
- 2002–2006: Pelister

Senior career*
Years	Team	Apps	(Gls)
2007–2008	Belasica	29	(5)
2008–2010	Pelister	44	(2)
2010–2011	Persebaya 1927	24	(3)
2011–2012	Kitchee	19	(0)
2012–2013	Rabotnički	10	(0)
2013–2014	Yangon United	30	(3)
2014–2014	Belasica	9	(0)
2014–2015	Pelister	12	(3)
2015–2016	Siam Navy	23	(2)
2016–2017	Pelister	20	(1)
- * Club domestic league appearances and goals as of 11:47, 20 April 2017 (UTC)

Michael Cvetkovski (Macedonian: Мajkl Цветковски; born 21 November 1987) is a Macedonian-Australian professional footballer who plays as a defender.

== Career ==
=== FC Pelister (2002–2006) ===
Michael Cvetkovski was born in Sydney, Australia on 21 Nov 1987. Cvetkovski started his professional career at age 8 with his local football club Rockdale City Suns, in Sydney. Eager to develop his skills he moved to (Europe) Macedonia at age 14 and signed with top league side FC Pelister. Cvetkovski continued to develop as a football player and progressed through the youth system of Pelister playing consistently through each season, not long his performances caught the attention of the first team management of Pelister and was offered a 4-year professional contract at age 18.

=== FC Belasica (2007–2008) ===
As a young skillful player Cvetkovski was sent out on loan to top-tier side FC Belasica to gain experience and receive exposure to top-tier football in the country. It did not take long for Cvetkovski to show his football qualities as he was selected to represent Belasica internationally at the Viareggio Cup World Football Tournament Coppa Carnevale 2008.

==== Viareggio Cup World Football Tournament Coppa Carnevale 2008 ====
FC Belasica (Macedonia), AC Milan (Italy), FC Bari (Italy), Malaysian Indian (Malaysia), were drawn in group D of the tournament. Cvetkovski made 3 appearances with FC Belasica and finished second on equal points with FC Bari, but due to goal difference FC Belasica did not qualify to the second round.

=== FC Pelister (2008–2010) ===
After having a successful year at FC Belasica, Cvetkovski returns to FC Pelister in 2009 and makes his debut on the 15 August 2009. FC Pelister had an outstanding season finishing 4th on the table, 2009/10 season. Cvetkovski once again impressed with his performances, and after two seasons with FC Pelister and 44 appearances decided to accept an offer from Persebaya 1927.

=== FC Persebaya 1927 (2010–2011) ===
On 20 December 2010 Cvetkovski transfers to Persebaya 1927 and signs a 1-year contract for an undisclosed amount. Cvetkovski made 24 appearances for Persebaya 1927 and scored 3 goals helping to secure the top position on the table for the 2010/11 season.

=== Kitchee SC (2011–2012) ===
On 21 August 2011, he has been offered a contract to play for Kitchee in the 2011–12 Hong Kong First Division League and 2012 AFC Cup, after performing to the satisfaction of coach Josep Gombau in the pre-season training matches in Spain. Due to goalkeeper Li Jian's injury, Cvetkovski's registration was delayed in case a foreign goalkeeper was needed. But after Guo Jianqiao was signed from Tai Chung FC, Cvetkovski's registration was also completed and he will be able to make his debut against Hong Kong Sapling. Michael made his first appearance in the Hong Kong First Division League as a second-half substitute on 25 September 2011 in the match against Hong Kong Sapling, which Kitchee won 6:0. But on 1 December, Ken Ng announced that as Michael cannot adapt to Kitchee's playing style, and on the request of Cvetkovski that he be released from the club.

=== FC Rabotnički (2012–2013) ===
In 2012, he returned to Macedonia signing with top league side FC Rabotnicki.

=== Yangon United (2013–2014) ===
On 4 January 2013, he transfers to Yangon United from Myanmar.

Cvetkovski won the 2013 Myanmar Championship with Yangon United and also led the club to the 2013 AFC Cup Round of 16 for the first time in the club's history.

He made 30 appearances and scored 3 goals for the club in all competitions.

==== 2013 AFC Cup ====
Yangon United qualify for the top 16 of the 2013 AFC Cup after finishing top of there group.

=== FC Belasica (2014/3-2014/9) ===
On 2014 March, Cvetkovski returns to Macedonia, he signed a short-term deal with FC Belasica.

=== FC Pelister (2014/9-2015) ===
In September 2014, Cvetkovski returned to FC Pelister, Macedonia on a short-term deal.

=== Siam Navy FC (2015–2016) ===
In January 2015, Cvetkovski signed with Royal Thai Navy F.C., in the Thai Premier League on a one-year contract.

=== FC Pelister (2016–2017) ===
Returns to home club FC Pelister, Macedonia signs two-year contract.

== Personal life ==
Cvetkovski is married, and has one daughter: Anastasia.
