= Lam Ka Wai =

Hong Kong footballer (born 1985)

Lam Ka Wai 林嘉緯
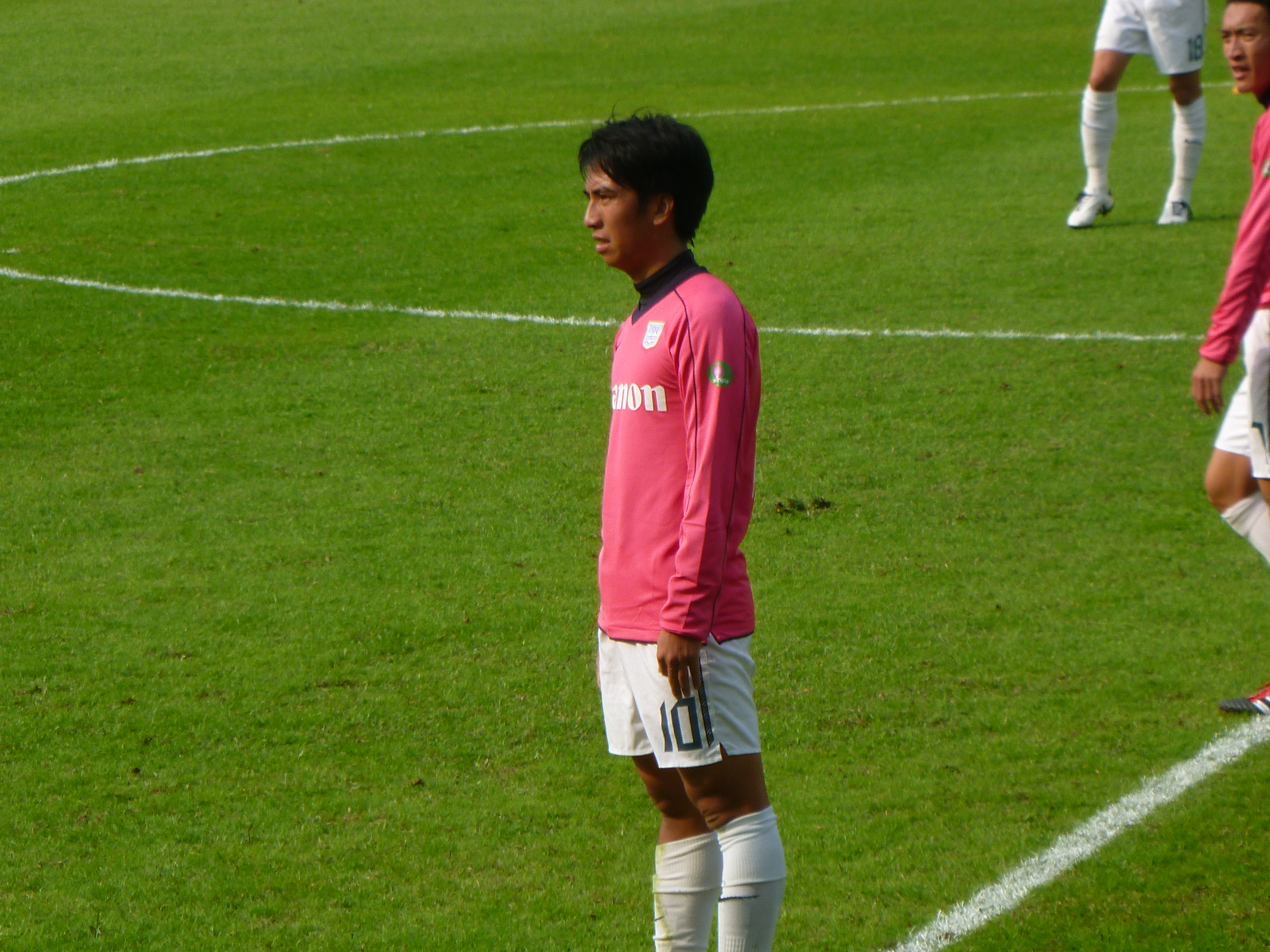
- Lam in 2012

Personal information
- Full name: Lam Ka Wai
- Date of birth: 5 June 1985 (age 41)
- Place of birth: Hong Kong
- Height: 1.72 m (5 ft 8 in)
- Position: Central midfielder

Team information
- Current team: Sha Tin
- Number: 10

Senior career*
Years	Team	Apps	(Gls)
2002–2008	Rangers (HKG)	51	(4)
2002–2003	→ Double Flower (loan)	6	(0)
2003–2004	→ Kitchee (loan)	14	(2)
2008–2018	Kitchee	133	(21)
2018–2020	Eastern	22	(4)
2020	R&F	1	(0)
2020–2024	Rangers (HKG)	56	(2)
2024–2026	Supreme	46	(13)
2026–	Sha Tin	7	(0)

International career
- Hong Kong U23
2005–2018	Hong Kong	51	(9)

Managerial career
- 2023–2026: Supreme
- 2024–2026: Rangers (HKG) (assistant coach)
- 2026–: Sha Tin (assistant coach)
- * Club domestic league appearances and goals

Lam Ka Wai (Chinese: 林嘉緯; Jyutping: lam^{4} gaa^{1} wai^{5}; born 5 June 1985) is a Hong Kong professional footballer who currently plays as a midfielder for Hong Kong Premier League club Sha Tin. He is also the assistant coach of the club.

Lam is an AFC B License holder.

== Club career ==
=== Early career ===
Lam lived away from his parents and spent his childhood years playing football. During his school life, he showed his talent in soccer. He could complete with high school teammates while aged 15. He was studying in Concordia Lutheran School and he ceased his studies to pursue a footballing career by Secondary 3.

Lam started his football career at Yee Hope's youth academy. In 2002 he joined Rangers but was loaned to Double Flower on a monthly salary of just HKD$1,500, to train under coach Chiu Chung Man. In 2003, Lam was loaned further to Kitchee when he was just 17, along with future Hong Kong teammate Chan Siu Ki.

In 2004, Lam returned to Rangers and began to impress. He was selected for the Hong Kong national team in 2005 and scored on his debut. Unfortunately, he suffered a severe ankle ligament injury in 2005 and was sidelined for most of the league season.

=== Kitchee ===
Lam joined Kitchee in 2008 and, along with fullback Lo Kwan Yee, has been the mainstay of the club for most of the 2010s. Lam's potential as a central playmaker was recognized by head coach Josep Gombau, who selected him to play the pivotal No. 10 role for Kitchee.

In June 2010, Kitchee reported to the Hong Kong Football Association that Fourway Rangers made an illegal approach to his services.

==== 2010–11 season ====
In the 2010–11 Hong Kong First Division League season, Lam led all local players with 9 goals on the season, including 2 goals against eventual runners-up South China in a crucial 4–3 away win, and was a key member of the team which won the First Division title by one point. This was the first title for Kitchee in 47 years, gaining the club the rights to play in the 2011 Barclays Asia Trophy and 2012 AFC Cup. For his efforts, Lam was voted into the Hong Kong Top Footballer Awards Best XI of the 2010–11 season.

After the season ended, Lam played in a local soccer game without Kitchee's consent and fractured his fibula, rendering him unavailable in both the 2014 FIFA World Cup Asian Qualifiers (representing Hong Kong) and the 2011 Premier League Asia Trophy. Lam's vice-captaincy at Kitchee was subsequently suspended.

==== 2011–12 season ====
On 19 April 2012, Lam received the Monthly MVP award for the month of March from the Hong Kong Sports Press Association, after helping the club win the 2011–12 Hong Kong League Cup. Lam proceeded to win the domestic treble with Kitchee in the 2011–12 season.

==== 2012–13 season ====
Lam's impact was limited by various injuries throughout Kitchee's 2012-13 campaign, recording only 10 appearances and 1 goal in the league. Despite the second-place finish, Kitchee retained their rights to play in the 2014 AFC Cup through winning the 2012–13 Hong Kong season play-off.

==== 2013–14 season ====
On 29 July 2013, in an exhibition match against English Premier League giants Manchester United at the Hong Kong Stadium, Lam scored by curling the ball into the top corner from outside the box on 53 minutes after dribbling past star midfielder Michael Carrick, giving reserve United keeper Ben Amos no chance. He also recorded an assist in a 2–5 defeat.

In the league season, Lam played a central role and contributed to Kitchee's Invincible season en route to their third title in four seasons. Lam also took part in Kitchee's monumental run to the semi-finals of the 2014 AFC Cup, scoring a goal against Arema Cronus in the Round of 16.

==== 2016–17 season ====
On 25 January 2017, Lam scored a last-minute winner versus Hà Nội to lift Kitchee to victory in their 2017 AFC Champions League qualifying play-off match.

==== 2017–18 season ====
On 26 May 2018, Lam made his final appearance for Kitchee as the club won the 2017–18 Hong Kong FA Cup.

=== Eastern ===
After over a decade at Kitchee, Lam signed with fellow Hong Kong Premier League club Eastern on 1 July 2018.

=== R&F ===
On 13 January 2020, Lam terminated his contract with Eastern and signed with rivals R&F. The contract is for a half year, with a clause for an automatic extension after seven league appearances.

However, after the outbreak of the COVID-19 pandemic in Hong Kong in 2020, the 2019–20 season was suspended before he could trigger an extension. Thus, on 6 June 2020, Lam revealed that R&F had declined to renew his contract at the club.

=== Rangers ===
On 10 September 2020, Rangers' Director of Football Philip Lee declared that Lam would return to the club as a player and a youth team coach. He added that Lam would sign a one-year contract and be given the captain's armband.

On 6 April 2024, Lam announced his retirement from professional football at the end of the 2023–24 season.

=== Sha Tin ===
On 8 August 2026, Lam returned to top-flight and joined Sha Tin as a player-coach.

== International career ==
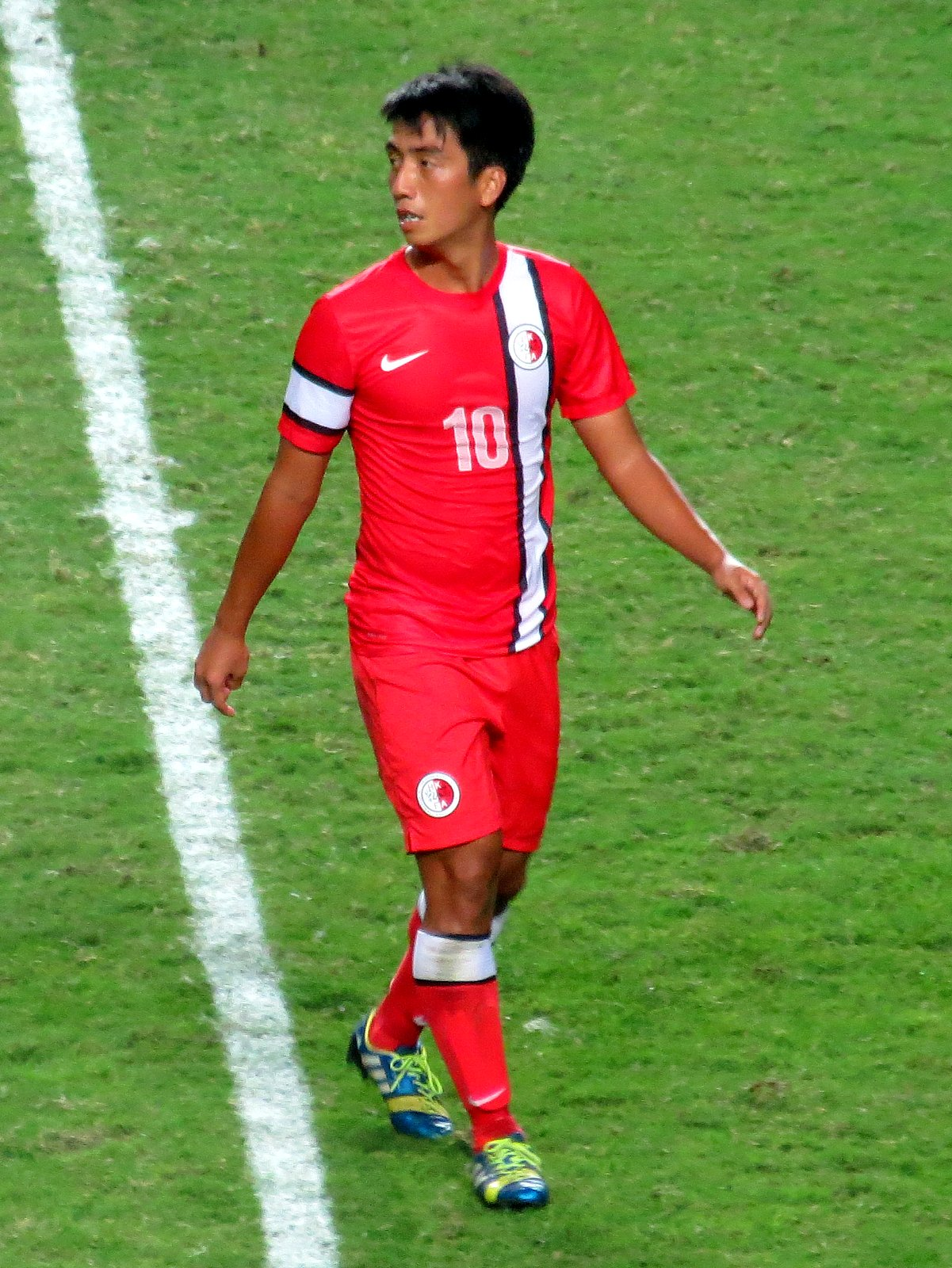
Lam playing for Hong Kong against UAE on 15 October 2013.

On 5 March 2005, Lam made his international debut for Hong Kong in the Preliminary Competition of 2005 East Asian Football Championship against Mongolia.

On 1 June 2012, Lam scored the only goal in Hong Kong's friendly win against Singapore at the Hong Kong Stadium.

== Career statistics ==
=== Club ===
As of 6 December 2006

Club	Season	League		League Cup		Senior Shield		FA Cup		AFC Cup		Total	
Club	Season	Apps	Goals	Apps	Goals	Apps	Goals	Apps	Goals	Apps	Goals	Apps	Goals
Double Flower (loan)	2002–03	?	?	?	?	?	0	?	0	—	—	?	?
Double Flower (loan)	Total						0		0	—	—		
Kitchee (loan)	2003–04	?	3	?	1	?	1	?	0	—	—	?	5
Kitchee (loan)	Total		3		1		1		0	—	—		5
Rangers	2004–05	?	2	?	1	1	0	1	0	—	—	?	3
Rangers	2005–06	9	0	3	1	0	0	1	0	—	—	13	1
Rangers	2006–07	8	0	0	0	0	0	0	0	—	—	8	0
Rangers	Total		2		2	1	0	2	0	—	—	?	4
Career Total							1		0	—	—		

=== International ===
As of 27 March 2018

National team	Year	Apps	Goals
Hong Kong	2005	4	2
Hong Kong	2006	0	0
Hong Kong	2007	4	1
Hong Kong	2008	0	0
Hong Kong	2009	1	0
Hong Kong	2010	1	0
Hong Kong	2011	2	0
Hong Kong	2012	6	1
Hong Kong	2013	5	0
Hong Kong	2014	7	3
Hong Kong	2015	10	2
Hong Kong	2016	6	0
Hong Kong	2017	4	0
Hong Kong	2018	1	0
Total		51	9

#	Date	Venue	Opponent	Result	Scored	Competition
1	5 March 2005	Chungshan Soccer Stadium, Taipei, Taiwan	Mongolia	6–0	1	2005 EAFF Championship Preliminary
2	7 March 2005	Chungshan Soccer Stadium, Taipei, Taiwan	Guam	15–0	0	2005 EAFF Championship Preliminary
3	11 March 2005	Chungshan Soccer Stadium, Taipei, Taiwan	Chinese Taipei	5–0	1	2005 EAFF Championship Preliminary
4	13 March 2005	Chungshan Soccer Stadium, Taipei, Taiwan	North Korea	0–2	0	2005 EAFF Championship Preliminary
5	21 October 2007	Gianyar Stadium, Gianyar, Indonesia	Timor-Leste	3–2	0	2010 FIFA World Cup qualification
6	28 October 2007	Hong Kong Stadium, Hong Kong	Timor-Leste	8–1	1	2010 FIFA World Cup qualification
7	10 November 2007	Hong Kong Stadium, Hong Kong	Turkmenistan	0–0	0	2010 FIFA World Cup qualification
8	18 November 2007	Olympic Stadium, Ashgabat, Turkmenistan	Turkmenistan	0–3	0	2010 FIFA World Cup qualification
9	9 October 2009	Outsourcing Stadium, Shizuoka, Japan	Japan	0–6	0	2011 AFC Asian Cup qualification
10	17 November 2010	Hong Kong Stadium, Hong Kong	Paraguay	0–7	0	Friendly
11	9 February 2011	Shah Alam Stadium, Kuala Lumpur	Malaysia	0–2	0	Friendly
12	3 June 2011	Siu Sai Wan Sports Ground, Hong Kong	Malaysia	1–1	0	Friendly
13	29 February 2012	Mong Kok Stadium, Hong Kong	Chinese Taipei	5–1	0	Friendly
14	1 June 2012	Hong Kong Stadium, Hong Kong	Singapore	1–0	1	Friendly
15	10 June 2012	Mong Kok Stadium, Hong Kong	Vietnam	1–2	0	Friendly
16	18 August 2012	Jurong West Stadium, Singapore	Singapore	0–2	0	Friendly
17	16 October 2012	Mong Kok Stadium, Mong Kok, Kowloon	Malaysia	0–3	0	Friendly
18	14 November 2012	Shah Alam Stadium, Shah Alam, Malaysia	Malaysia	1–1	0	Friendly
19	22 March 2013	Mong Kok Stadium, Mong Kok, Hong Kong	Vietnam	1–0	0	2015 AFC Asian Cup qualification
20	4 June 2013	Mong Kok Stadium, Mong Kok, Hong Kong	Philippines	0–1	0	Friendly
	6 September 2013	Thuwunna Stadium, Yangon, Myanmar	Myanmar	0–0	0	Friendly
21	10 September 2013	Mong Kok Stadium, Mong Kok, Hong Kong	Singapore	1–0	0	Friendly
22	15 October 2013	Hong Kong Stadium, So Kon Po, Hong Kong	United Arab Emirates	0–4	0	2015 AFC Asian Cup qualification
23	19 November 2013	Hong Kong Stadium, So Kon Po, Hong Kong	Uzbekistan	0–2	0	2015 AFC Asian Cup qualification
24	5 March 2014	Mỹ Đình National Stadium, Hanoi, Vietnam	Vietnam	1–3	1	2015 AFC Asian Cup qualification
25	6 September 2014	Lạch Tray Stadium, Hai Phong, Vietnam	Vietnam	1–3	1	Friendly
26	9 September 2014	Hougang Stadium, Hougang, Singapore	Singapore	0–0	0	Friendly
27	10 October 2014	Mong Kok Stadium, Hong Kong	Singapore	2–1	0	Friendly
28	14 October 2014	Hong Kong Stadium, Hong Kong	Argentina	0–7	0	Friendly
29	16 November 2014	Taipei Municipal Stadium, Taipei, Taiwan	Chinese Taipei	1–0	1	2015 EAFF East Asian Cup preliminary round 2
30	19 November 2014	Taipei Municipal Stadium, Taipei, Taiwan	Guam	0–0	0	2015 EAFF East Asian Cup preliminary round 2
31	28 March 2015	Mong Kok Stadium, Hong Kong	Guam	1–0	0	Friendly
32	6 June 2015	Shah Alam Stadium, Selangor, Malaysia	Malaysia	0–0	0	Friendly
33	11 June 2015	Mong Kok Stadium, Hong Kong	Bhutan	7–0	1	2018 FIFA World Cup qualification – AFC second round
34	16 June 2015	Mong Kok Stadium, Hong Kong	Maldives	2–0	1	2018 FIFA World Cup qualification – AFC second round
35	3 September 2015	Bao'an Stadium, Shenzhen, China	China	0–0	0	2018 FIFA World Cup qualification – AFC second round
36	8 September 2015	Mong Kok Stadium, Hong Kong	Qatar	2–3	0	2018 FIFA World Cup qualification – AFC second round
37	9 October 2015	Rajamangala Stadium, Bangkok, Thailand	Thailand	0–1	0	Friendly
38	13 October 2015	Changlimithang Stadium, Thimphu, Bhutan	Bhutan	1–0	0	2018 FIFA World Cup qualification – AFC second round
39	7 November 2015	Mong Kok Stadium, Hong Kong	Myanmar	5–0	0	Friendly
40	12 November 2015	National Football Stadium, Malé, Maldives	Maldives	1–0	0	2018 FIFA World Cup qualification – AFC second round
41	1 September 2016	Mong Kok Stadium, Hong Kong	Cambodia	4–2	0	Friendly
42	6 October 2016	Olympic Stadium, Phnom Penh, Cambodia	Cambodia	2–0	0	Friendly
43	11 October 2016	Mong Kok Stadium, Hong Kong	Singapore	2–0	0	Friendly
44	6 November 2016	Mong Kok Stadium, Hong Kong	Guam	3–2	0	EAFF E-1 Football Championship 2017 Round 2
45	9 November 2016	Mong Kok Stadium, Hong Kong	Chinese Taipei	4–2	0	EAFF E-1 Football Championship 2017 Round 2
46	12 November 2016	Mong Kok Stadium, Hong Kong	North Korea	0–1	0	EAFF E-1 Football Championship 2017 Round 2
47	7 June 2017	Mong Kok Stadium, Hong Kong	Jordan	0–0	0	Friendly
48	31 August 2017	Jalan Besar Stadium, Kallang, Singapore	Singapore	1–1	0	Friendly
49	5 September 2017	Hang Jebat Stadium, Malacca City, Malaysia	Malaysia	1–1	0	2019 AFC Asian Cup qualifying round – third round
50	14 November 2017	Hong Kong Stadium, Hong Kong	Lebanon	0–1	0	2019 AFC Asian Cup qualifying round – third round
51	27 March 2018	Kim Il-sung Stadium, Pyongyang, North Korea	North Korea	0–2	0	2019 AFC Asian Cup qualifying round – third round

== Honours ==
Kitchee

- Hong Kong Premier League: 2014–15, 2016–17, 2017–18
- Hong Kong First Division: 2010–11, 2011–12, 2013–14
- Hong Kong Senior Shield: 2016–17
- Hong Kong FA Cup: 2011–12, 2012–13, 2014–15, 2016–17, 2017–18
- Hong Kong Sapling Cup: 2017–18
- Hong Kong League Cup: 2011–12, 2014–15, 2015–16

Rangers

- Hong Kong Sapling Cup: 2023–24
