= Jaimes McKee =

Hong Kong footballer (born 1987)

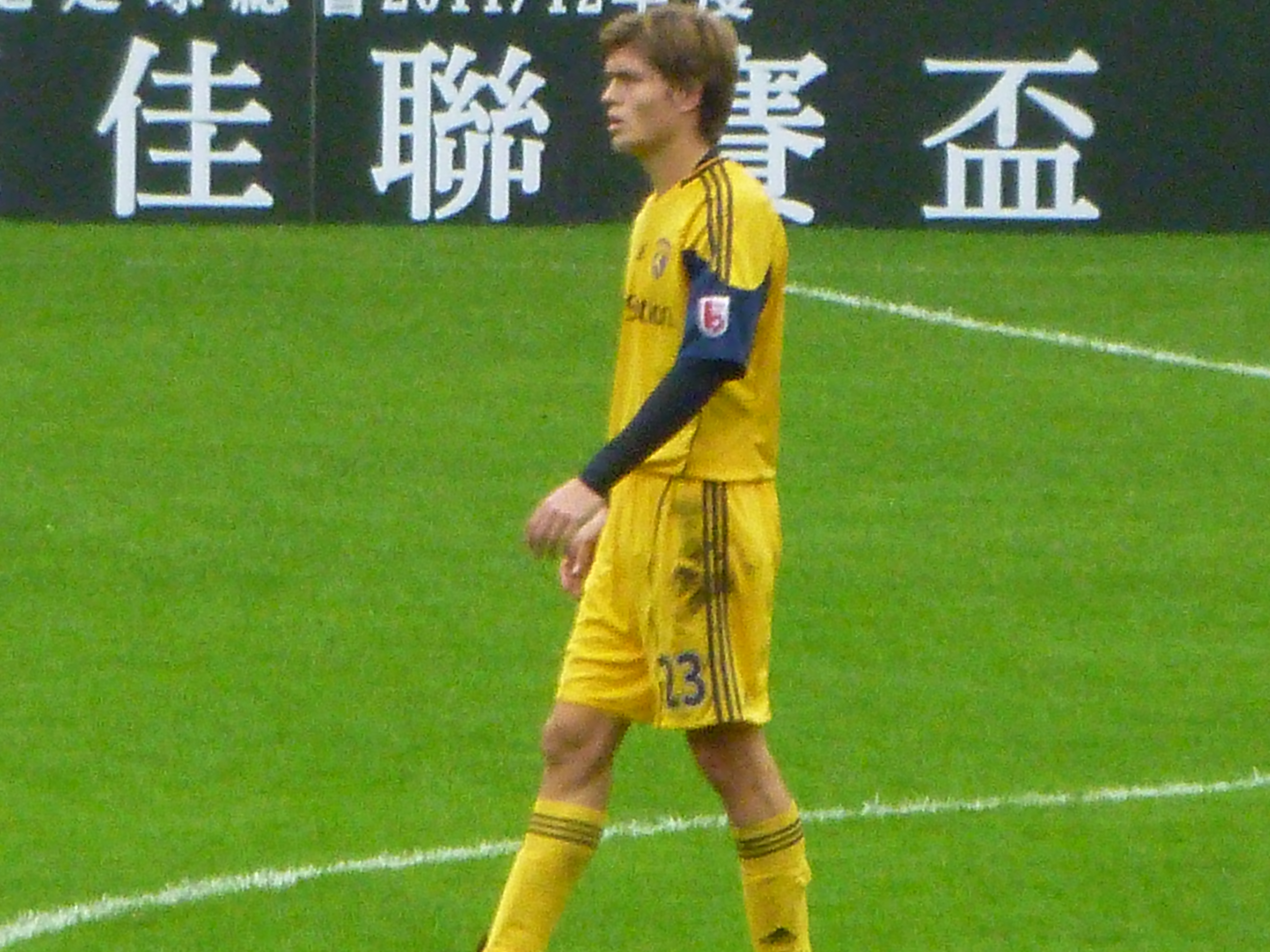
- McKee with Pegasus in 2012

Personal information
- Full name: Jaimes Anthony McKee
- Date of birth: 14 April 1987 (age 39)
- Place of birth: Birmingham, England
- Height: 1.78 m (5 ft 10 in)
- Positions: Forward; winger

Youth career
- 2003–2005: HKFC

Senior career*
Years	Team	Apps	(Gls)
2005–2007	HKFC	33	(24)
2007–2010	Kitchee	26	(6)
2009–2010	→ Southern (loan)	0	(0)
2010–2011	HKFC	14	(4)
2011–2016	Pegasus	67	(29)
2016–2019	Eastern	39	(10)

International career
2012–2019	Hong Kong	53	(12)

Managerial career
- 2023–: Hong Kong U23 (assistant coach)
- * Club domestic league appearances and goals

Jaimes Anthony McKee (Chinese: 麥基; born 14 April 1987) is a former professional footballer who played as a forward or winger. He is the assistant coach of Hong Kong U-23.

He was the top scorer of the Hong Kong Senior Shield in the 2006–07 season and the top scorer of the Hong Kong First Division in the 2012–13 season. Born in England, he was raised mainly in Hong Kong and was selected 53 times for the Hong Kong national football team between 2012 and 2019. He is the grandson of former Birmingham City footballer Frank McKee.

== Early life ==
McKee was born on 14 July 1987 in Birmingham, England. He moved to Dubai with his family when he was 2 years old. McKee's family then moved to Hong Kong in 1997 where he began playing football. McKee studied at King George V School in Hong Kong and played in the inter-school football competition of the Hong Kong Schools Sports Federation.

== Club career ==
=== HKFC ===
McKee started his senior career with HKFC. He scored his first senior goal for the club against Eastern in the 80th minute on 16 October 2005. Even though during his first season he wasn't a regular first team forward, he scored an impressive 19 goals in 18 games in the second division league. McKee scored two hat-tricks during his first season, once against Korchina on 13 November 2005 and another against Kwok Keung on 12 February 2006.

During the 2006–07 season, McKee scored two goals for the HKFC against league winners South China. McKee was selected by Casemiro Mior for Hong Kong League XI after this incredible performance. He is the youngest player ever and the first Hong Kong FC player to be called up for the selection team. However, McKee was injured before the 2007 Lunar New Year Cup, and Ivan Jević replaced him.

Along with HKFC's relegation, McKee was pursued by Sun Hei. However, he joined Kitchee in 2007, saying it might be difficult to start in such a large club.

=== Kitchee ===
McKee made his Kitchee debut on 16 September 2007 in a 2–2 first division league draw with Eastern. He came off the bench in the 71st minute for Cheung Kin Fung. McKee's first goal for Kitchee in the league match was against the Rangers at the Mong Kok Stadium on 14 October 2007. He was predominantly a substitute player for Kitchee during this time. However, in the league game against Tai Po on 12 April 2008, he made a comeback by scoring two goals.

McKee got off to a great start of the season by scoring in the 12th minute against a new club Pegasus on 7 September 2008. He established himself as a regular first team player before the game against Sun Hei on 7 October 2008. However, he was not the main player for Kitchee during his studies at the University of Hong Kong, even he scored two goals surprisingly as a substitute player and led Kitchee 3–2 defeat Happy Valley on 15 March 2008.

=== Back to HKFC ===
McKee returned to HKFC in 2010–11 season as the club was promoted to the First Division. As a result, the club became semi-professional. He did not make an appearance in the opening game of HKFC, but his name appeared on the players list of HKFC in the match against Pegasus on 10 September 2010.

McKee scored his first goal after returning to HKFC in the league match against Citizen on 23 October 2010, but HKFC could not defeat Citizen.

HKFC was relegated after finishing bottom in the 2010–11 Hong Kong First Division League, but Pegasus admired McKee's performance and invited him to join the club. In early June 2011, Kitchee, McKee's former club and last season's Hong Kong First Division League champions, made an agreement with McKee, However, they decided instead to contract a foreign player. McKee finally appeared on the team member list of Pegasus.

=== Pegasus ===
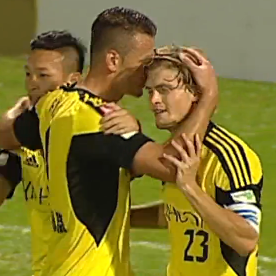
McKee celebrates scoring with Admir Raščić and Deng Jinghuang in 2013.

McKee played as a start-up player for Pegasus in the team's first league game of the 2011–12 season. He scored his first goal of the season in the match against Hong Kong Sapling as a substitute for Leandro Carrijo in the 15th minute.

In the first round of the 2011–12 Hong Kong Senior Challenge Shield against his former club Kitchee, McKee scored twice and led Pegasus to a 2–1 win. On 23 October 2011, McKee scored in a 2–3 loss against Kitchee at the Tseung Kwan O, meaning he has scored in every match against his old club.

On 25 February 2012, McKee responded with a spectacular brace in the extra-time of the quarter-final match against Sham Shui Po in League Cup. McKee scored a hat-trick and Pegasus won the game. In the quarter-final match on 11 March, McKee scored twice against Citizen and his team won 4–1.

On the final day of the 2012–13 season, McKee scored five goals against Rangers to take his tally to 16 goals and top of the scoring chart.

=== Eastern ===
On 6 July 2016, McKee signed a two-year contract with Eastern. He appeared in 16 league games in his first season, scoring 4 goals.

On 16 July 2019, McKee announced his retirement from professional football.

== International career ==
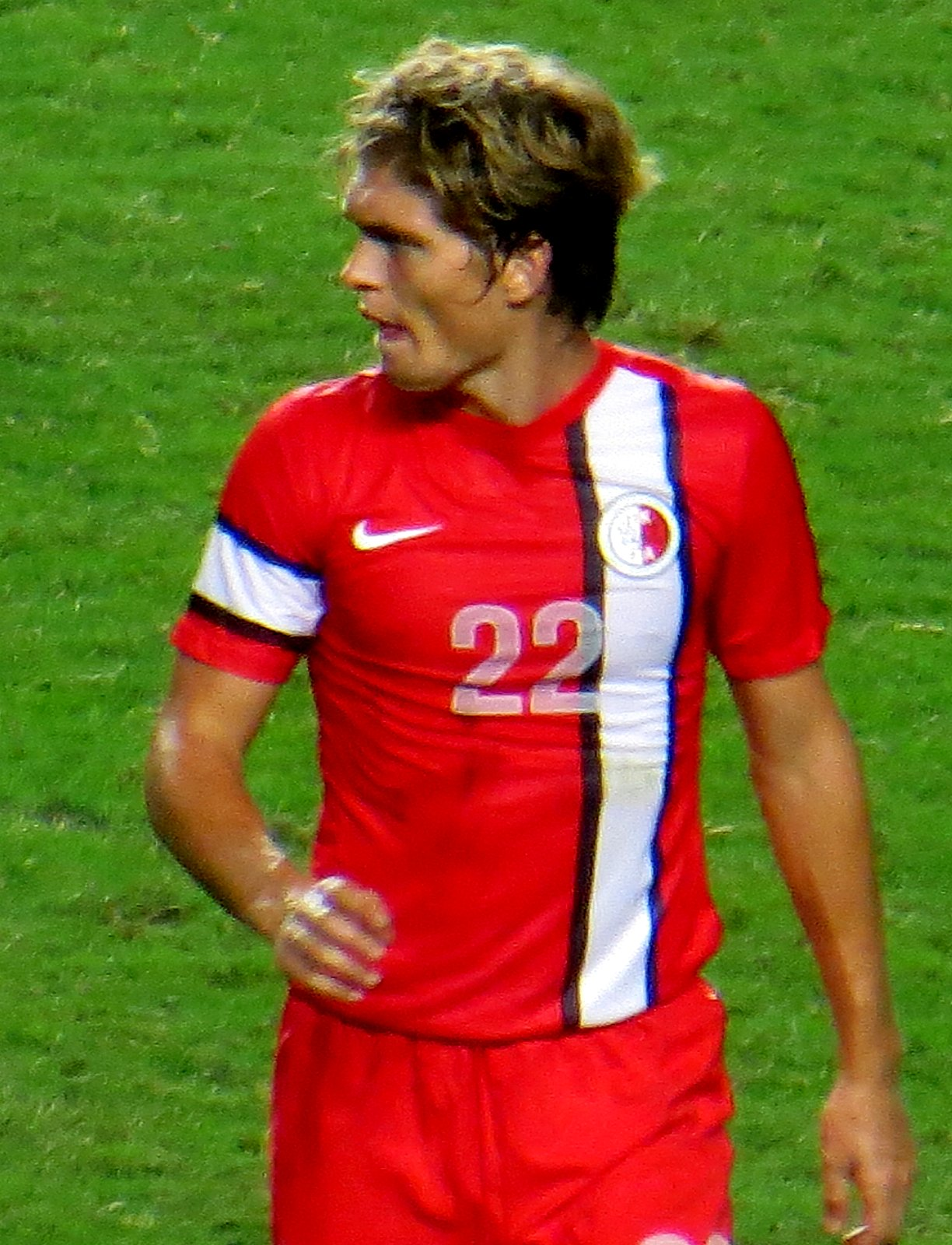
McKee playing for Hong Kong against UAE on 15 October 2013.

McKee held a British passport but his permanent residency in Hong Kong allowed him to become a Hong Kong passport holder. He was able to represent the Hong Kong national football team.

On 2 December 2011, McKee was called up by Hong Kong's caretaker coach Liu Chun Fai for the Hong Kong national football team to play against Guangdong in the 2012 Guangdong-Hong Kong Cup. McKee played as start-up right winger in the second leg of the Cup on 1 January 2012 and Hong Kong team won the 2012 Guangdong-Hong Kong Cup through penalty shootout.

On 14 November 2012, Mckee made his international debut against Malaysia in which Hong Kong drew by 1–1.

On 1 January 2014, Mckee scored his first goal for Hong Kong in the second leg of the Guangdong-Hong Kong Cup. On 13 November 2014, McKee scored his first international goal against North Korea which Hong Kong lost by 1–2.

McKee scored a brace for Hong Kong against Bhutan on 11 June 2015 in a 2018 FIFA World Cup qualifiers.

In June 2016, since the absence of captain Chan Wai Ho, vice-captain Yapp Hung Fai and Lee Chi Ho, McKee have served as Hong Kong captain during 2016 AYA Bank Cup.

On 11 June 2019, McKee made his last international appearance for Hong Kong in a friendly against Chinese Taipei.

== Career statistics ==
=== Club ===
As of 19 May 2019

Club performance			League		FA Cup & Shield		League Cup		Continental		Total	
Season	Club	League	Apps	Goals	Apps	Goals	Apps	Goals	Apps	Goals	Apps	Goals
2005–06	HKFC	Hong Kong Second Division	18	19	5	4	-		-		23	23
2006–07	HKFC	Hong Kong First Division	15	5	2	2	4	1	-		21	8
2007–08	Kitchee	Hong Kong First Division	12	3	2	0	2	0	0	0	16	3
2008–09	Kitchee	Hong Kong First Division	14	3	1	0	1	0	-		16	3
2009–10	Kitchee	Hong Kong First Division	0	0	0	0	-		-		0	0
2009–10	Southern	Hong Kong Third Division	0	0	-		-		-		0	0
2010–11	HKFC	Hong Kong First Division	14	4	2	0	2	1	-		18	5
2011–12	Pegasus	Hong Kong First Division	15	4	8	5	3	5	-		26	14
2012–13	Pegasus	Hong Kong First Division	18	16	7	2	-		-		25	18
2013–14	Pegasus	Hong Kong First Division	18	6	5	4	0	0	-		23	10
2014–15	Pegasus	Hong Kong Premier League	5	1	2	0	2	1	-		9	2
2015–16	Pegasus	Hong Kong Premier League	11	2	2	1	1	0	-		14	3
2016–17	Eastern	Hong Kong Premier League	16	4	4	1	0	0	6	0	27	5
2017–18	Eastern	Hong Kong Premier League	15	5	4	0	0	0	1	0	20	5
2018–19	Eastern	Hong Kong Premier League	8	1	3	0	0	0	-		11	1
Career total			179	73	47	19	15	8	7	0	249	100

=== International ===
As of 11 June 2019

National team	Year	Apps	Goals
Hong Kong	2012	5	0
Hong Kong	2013	8	0
Hong Kong	2014	4	1
Hong Kong	2015	11	5
Hong Kong	2016	9	3
Hong Kong	2017	9	1
Hong Kong	2018	6	2
Hong Kong	2019	1	0
Total		53	12

As of match played 10 October 2017. Hong score listed first, score column indicates score after each McKee goal.

International goals by date, venue, cap, opponent, score, result and competition
No.	Date	Venue	Cap	Opponent	Score	Result	Competition
1	13 November 2014	Taipei Municipal Stadium, Taipei, Taiwan	15	North Korea	1–2	1–2	2015 EAFF East Asian Cup Second qualification
2	28 March 2015	Mong Kok Stadium, Mong Kok, Hong Kong	18	Guam	1–0	1–0	Friendly
3	11 June 2015	Mong Kok Stadium, Mong Kok, Hong Kong	20	Bhutan	1–0	7–0	2018 FIFA World Cup qualification
4	11 June 2015	Mong Kok Stadium, Mong Kok, Hong Kong	20	Bhutan	6–0	7–0	2018 FIFA World Cup qualification
5	7 November 2015	Mong Kok Stadium, Mong Kok, Hong Kong	26	Myanmar	1–0	5–0	Friendly
6	7 November 2015	Mong Kok Stadium, Mong Kok, Hong Kong	26	Myanmar	3–0	5–0	Friendly
7	3 June 2016	Thuwunna Stadium, Yangon, Myanmar	30	Vietnam	1–0	2–2 (4–5 p)	2016 AYA Bank Cup
8	3 June 2016	Thuwunna Stadium, Yangon, Myanmar	30	Vietnam	2–2	2–2 (4–5 p)	2016 AYA Bank Cup
9	1 September 2016	Mong Kok Stadium, Mong Kok, Hong Kong	32	Cambodia	1–0	4–2	Friendly
10	10 October 2017	Hong Kong Stadium, Wanchai, Hong Kong	44	Malaysia	2–0	2–0	2019 AFC Asian Cup qualification
11	11 November 2018	Taipei Municipal Stadium, Taipei, Taiwan	49	Chinese Taipei	1–0	2–1	2019 EAFF E-1 Football Championship qualification
12	16 November 2018	Taipei Municipal Stadium, Taipei, Taiwan	51	Mongolia	2–0	5–1	2019 EAFF E-1 Football Championship

== Honours ==
HKFC

- Hong Kong Second Division: 2005–06

Pegasus

- Hong Kong FA Cup: 2015–16

Individual

- Hong Kong First Division Golden Boot: 2012–13
- Hong Kong Second Division Golden Boot: 2005–06

Sporting positions
Preceded by Ng Wai Chiu	Pegasus captain January 2013 – September 2014	Succeeded by Tong Kin Man
Awards
Preceded by Keith Gumbs	Hong Kong Senior Shield; Top Scorer Award with Wong Chun Yue, Lico, Tales Schutz; 2006–07	Succeeded by Rodrigo Andreis Galvao
Preceded by Cheng Lai Hin; Jordi Tarrés; Itaparica; Mateja Kežman	Hong Kong League Cup; Top Scorer; 2011–12	Succeeded by Vacant; Title next held by
Preceded by Sandro	Hong Kong First Division League; Top Scorer; 2012–13	Succeeded by Juan Belencoso
