= Yago González =

Spanish footballer

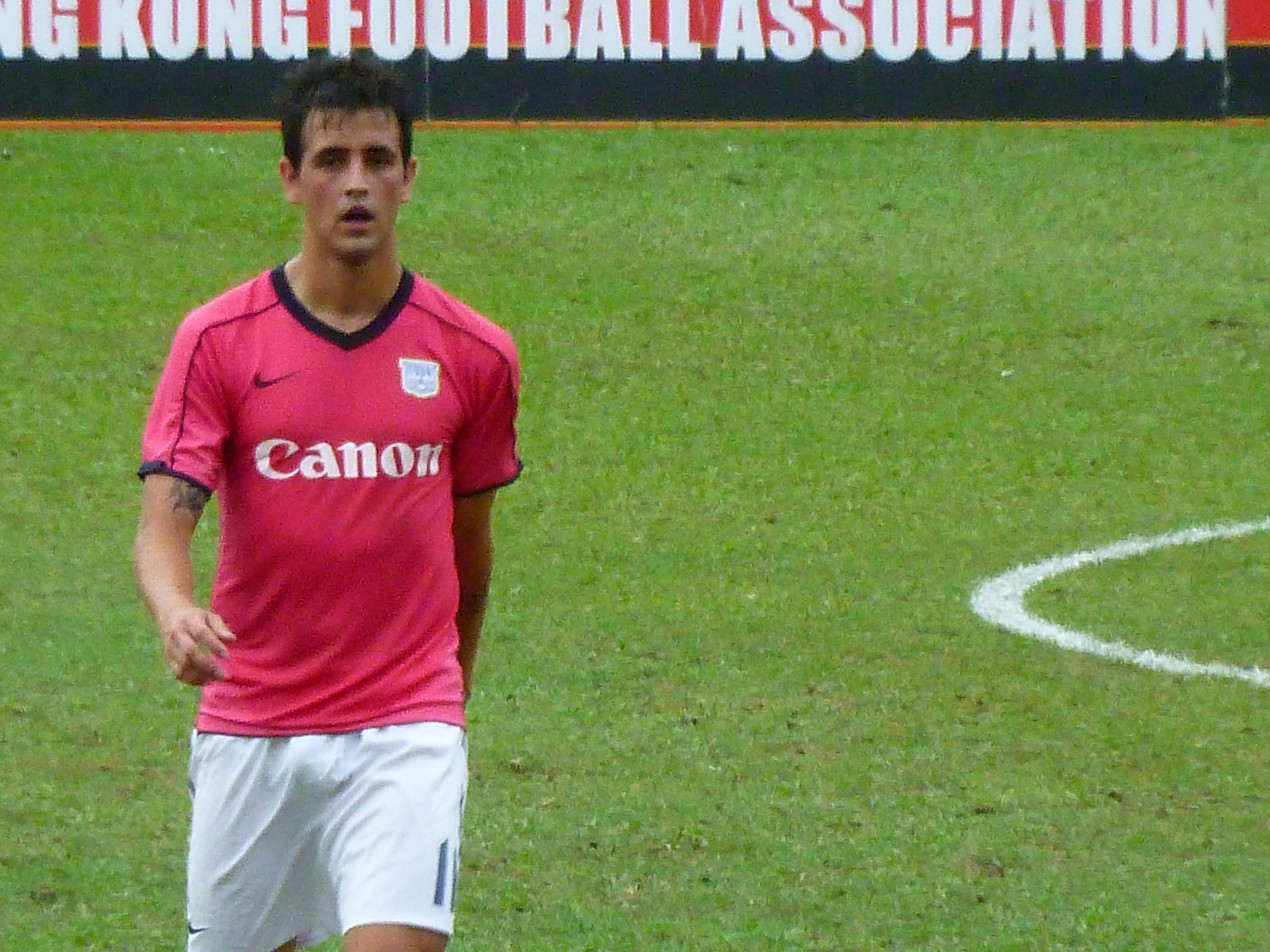
- González in 2012

Personal information
- Full name: Yago González López
- Date of birth: 6 November 1979 (age 47)
- Place of birth: Vigo, Spain
- Height: 1.84 m (6 ft 0 in)
- Position: Forward

Youth career
- 1997–1998: Celta

Senior career*
Years	Team	Apps	(Gls)
1998–1999	Celta B		
1999–2000	Águilas	17	(3)
2000–2006	Levante B		
2006–2008	Terrassa	62	(23)
2008–2009	Pontevedra	26	(3)
2009–2010	Zamora	32	(8)
2010–2011	Lugo	37	(3)
2011–2012	Pontevedra	?	(8)
2012–2013	Kitchee	26	(9)
2013–2014	Southern	16	(7)
2014–2015	Hong Kong Rangers	16	(7)
2015–2023	Pontellas		
- * Club domestic league appearances and goals

Yago González López (born 6 November 1979) is a Spanish former footballer who played as a forward.

He appeared in 241 games in Segunda División B over the course of eight seasons (59 goals scored), and played professionally in Hong Kong.

== Career ==
=== Spain ===
Born in Vigo, Galicia, González never played in higher than the third division in his country, being a youth product at local Celta de Vigo. He started his senior career with its B-team in 1998, competing in the fourth level.

During a 13-and-a-half-season spell, González played with Águilas CF, Levante UD B, Terrassa FC, Pontevedra CF (two spells), Zamora CF and CD Lugo, appearing in division three with all the clubs and in the fourth tier with the second and the fourth.

=== Kitchee ===
In January 2012, aged nearly 33, González signed with Kitchee SC from the Hong Kong First Division League. He made an impressive debut for his new club – also his first match as a professional – by scoring the winning goal and providing an assist in a league game against Sun Hei SC which finished with a 2–1 win, and went on to net a further five times in eight appearances as the campaign ended with the conquest of an historic treble.

In his second year, González only managed four goals in the league, but added three in four contests in the season's FA Cup as Kitchee renewed its supremacy in the latter competition.

=== Southern District ===
On 29 May 2013, González joined fellow league side Southern District RSA on a free transfer. He scored on his first appearance, a 2–3 away league loss against South China AA, adding a hat-trick at Sun Hei on 11 May 2014 to contribute decisively to a 3–2 win.

=== Hong Kong Rangers ===
On 31 May 2014, Yago signed for Hong Kong Rangers FC.

== Career statistics ==
As of 9 February 2015

Appearances and goals by club, season and competition
Club	Season	League			Cup		Other		Total	
Club	Season	Division	Apps	Goals	Apps	Goals	Apps	Goals	Apps	Goals
Águilas	1999–2000	Segunda División B	17	3	0	0	0	0	17	3
Levante B	2004–05	Segunda División B	36	6	0	0	0	0	36	6
Levante B	2005–06	Segunda División B	36	13	0	0	3	0	39	13
Levante B	Total		72	19	0	0	3	0	75	19
Terrassa	2006–07	Segunda División B	36	12	1	0	0	0	37	12
Terrassa	2007–08	Segunda División B	26	11	0	0	0	0	26	11
Terrassa	Total		62	23	1	0	0	0	63	23
Pontevedra	2008–09	Segunda División B	26	3	1	0	0	0	27	3
Zamora	2009–10	Segunda División B	32	8	2	1	0	0	34	9
Lugo	2010–11	Segunda División B	32	3	0	0	5	0	37	3
Kitchee	2011–12	Hong Kong First Division League	9	5	7	2	0	0	16	7
Kitchee	2012–13	Hong Kong First Division League	17	4	6	3	0	0	23	7
Kitchee	Total		26	9	13	5	7	0	39	14
Southern	2013–14	Hong Kong First Division League	16	7	4	0	1	0	21	7
Hong Kong Rangers	2014–15	Hong Kong Premier League	10	4	4	2	0	0	14	6
Career total			293	79	25	8	9	0	327	87

== Honours ==
Kitchee

- Hong Kong First Division League: 2011–12
- Hong Kong FA Cup: 2011–12, 2012–13
- Hong Kong League Cup: 2011–12
