= Guy Junior Ondoua =

Cameroonian footballer

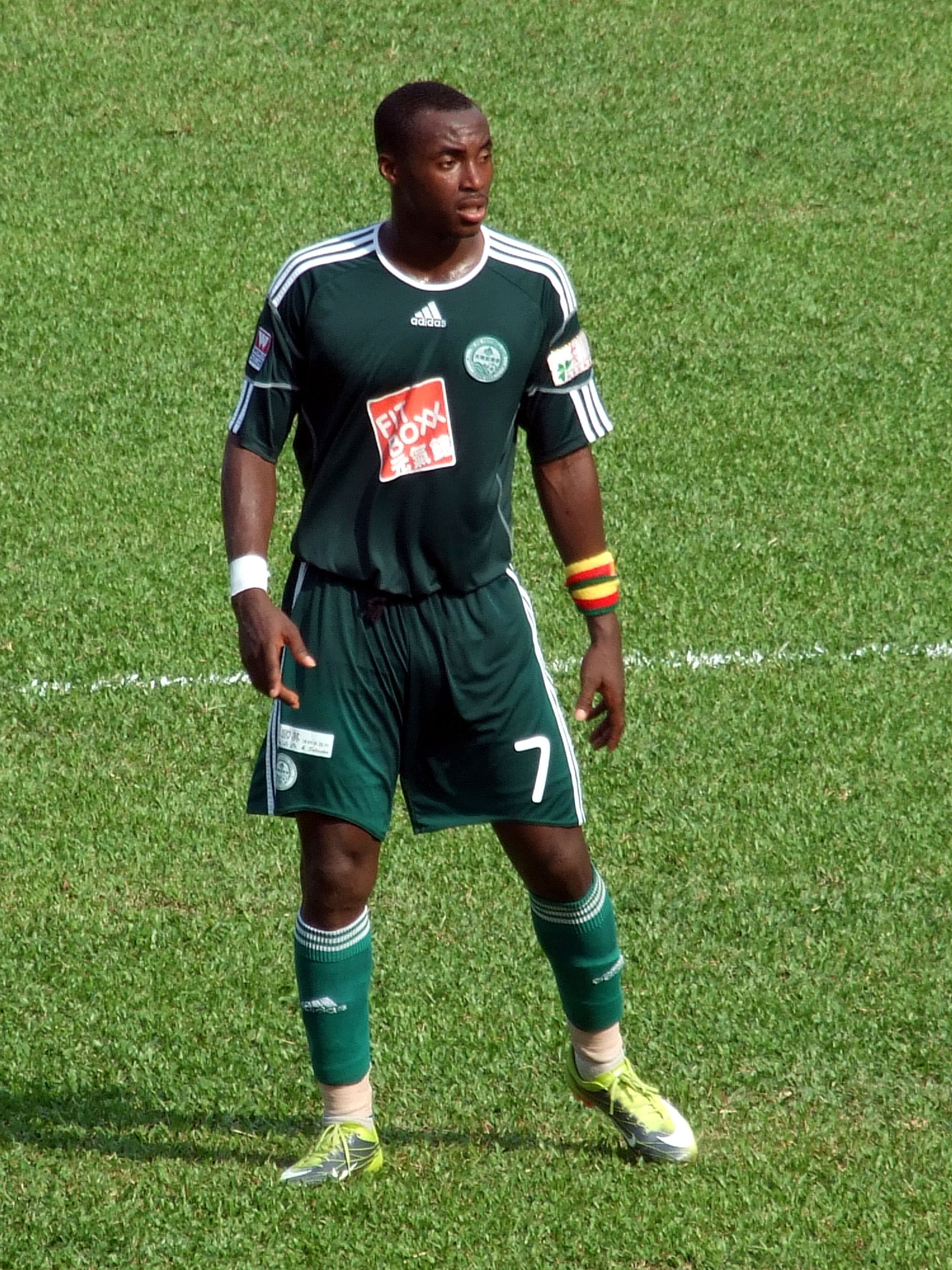
- Guy playing for Tai Po in 2010

Personal information
- Full name: Guy Junior Nke Ondoua
- Date of birth: 30 August 1986 (age 40)
- Place of birth: Douala, Cameroon
- Height: 1.80 m (5 ft 11 in)
- Position: Forward

Team information
- Current team: Persikota Tangerang
- Number: 39

Senior career*
Years	Team	Apps	(Gls)
2005	PS Palembang	15	(5)
2006	Gresik United	14	(6)
2007	Persidafon Dafonsoro	30	(13)
2008	Persebaya Surabaya	12	(4)
2008–2009	TSW Pegasus	11	(6)
2009	Bulleen Lions	16	(5)
2009–2010	Fourway Rangers	18	(5)
2010–2011	Tai Po	18	(5)
2011–2012	Hong Kong Rangers	17	(2)
2013	Persiwa Wamena	26	(9)
2014–2015	PSS Sleman	22	(11)
2016–2017	Madura United	2	(0)
2017	Bhayangkara	25	(5)
2018–2019	PSM Makassar	37	(10)
2020–2021	Borneo	6	(1)
2021–2022	Barito Putera	16	(2)
2022	Sriwijaya	6	(2)
2023–2024	Kalteng Putra	14	(7)
2024–	Persikota Tangerang	7	(1)
- * Club domestic league appearances and goals as of 15 February 2025

Guy Junior Nke Ondoua (born 30 August 1986) is a Cameroonian professional footballer who plays as a forward for Liga 2 club Persikota Tangerang.

== Club career ==
=== TSW Pegasus ===
Ondoua scored twice against Tuen Mun Progoal. He helped TSW Pegasus win the title by scoring two goals in the final against Sun Hei and was TSW Pegasus' leading goal scorer in the 2008-09 Hong Kong Senior Challenge Shield. But he was let go to make room for Masayuki Okano, a more marketable player.

=== Tai Po FC ===
Previously he played for Hong Kong First Division club Tai Po during the 2010–11 season. On 23 May 2011, he scored a hat-trick for Tai Po against Tuen Mun in their 7:1 victory.

=== HK Rangers ===
Ondoua signed for Hong Kong Rangers on 14 September 2011. He made 17 league appearances and scored 2 goals for Biu Chun Rangers.

=== Persiwa Wamena ===
In 2013, Guy Junior signed a one-year contract with Persiwa Wamena. He made his debut on 13 January 2013 in a match against Persita Tangerang. On 31 January 2013, Guy Junior scored his first goal for Persiwa against Persela Lamongan in the 81st minute at the Pendidikan Stadium, Wamena.

=== PSS Sleman ===
In 2014, Guy Junior signed a contract with Liga Indonesia Premier Division club PSS Sleman. He made 22 league appearances and scored 11 goals for PSS Sleman.

=== Madura United ===
He was signed for Madura United to play in Indonesia Soccer Championship A in the 2016 season.

=== Bhayangkara ===
After his contract was terminated by Madura United, on 30 April 2017, Ondoua signed for Bhayangkara. He was chosen by the club's coach because he's believed to be able to strengthen the club's front line which currently rely solely on Thiago Furtuoso after his long-term injury. Ondoua made his debut on 3 May 2017 in a match against Sriwijaya. On 19 June 2017, Ondoua scored his first goal for Bhayangkara against Persiba Balikpapan.

=== PSM Makassar ===
In January 2018, Ondoua signed for PSM Makassar in Indonesian Liga 1. He made his debut on 25 March 2018 in a match against PSIS Semarang in the Liga 1. On 21 April 2018, Guy Junior scored his first goal for PSM against PS TIRA in the 36th minute at the Andi Mattalatta Stadium, Makassar.

=== Borneo ===
He was signed for Borneo to play in Liga 1 in the 2020 season. Guy Junior made his debut on 1 March 2020 in a match against Persija Jakarta. This season was suspended on 27 March 2020 due to the COVID-19 pandemic. The season was abandoned and was declared void on 20 January 2021. On 4 September 2021, Guy Junior scored his first goal for Borneo against Persebaya Surabaya in the 61st minute at the Wibawa Mukti Stadium, Bekasi.

=== Barito Putera ===
In January 2022, Guy signed a contract with Liga 2 club Barito Putera. Guy made his league debut in a 3–0 lost against Bali United as a starter on 9 January 2022 at the Ngurah Rai Stadium, Denpasar. On 18 January 2022, Guy Junior scored his first goal for Barito Putera against Persikabo 1973 in the 43rd minute at the Kompyang Sujana Stadium, Denpasar.

== Personal life ==
Guy Junior was born in Douala, Cameroon. In July 2016, he was naturalized and became a citizen of Indonesia. Guy Junior married a woman from Indonesia in 2006, Cholin Misgetawati. They have three sons named Moise, Aaron, Ezekiel.

== Honours ==
TSW Pegasus

- Hong Kong Senior Challenge Shield: 2008–09

Bhayangkara

- Liga 1: 2017

PSM Makassar

- Piala Indonesia: 2018–19

Awards and achievements
Preceded by Rodrigo	Hong Kong Senior Shield top scorer 2008–09	Succeeded by Chan Siu Ki
