= Jordi Tarrés (footballer) =

Spanish-born Hong Kong footballer

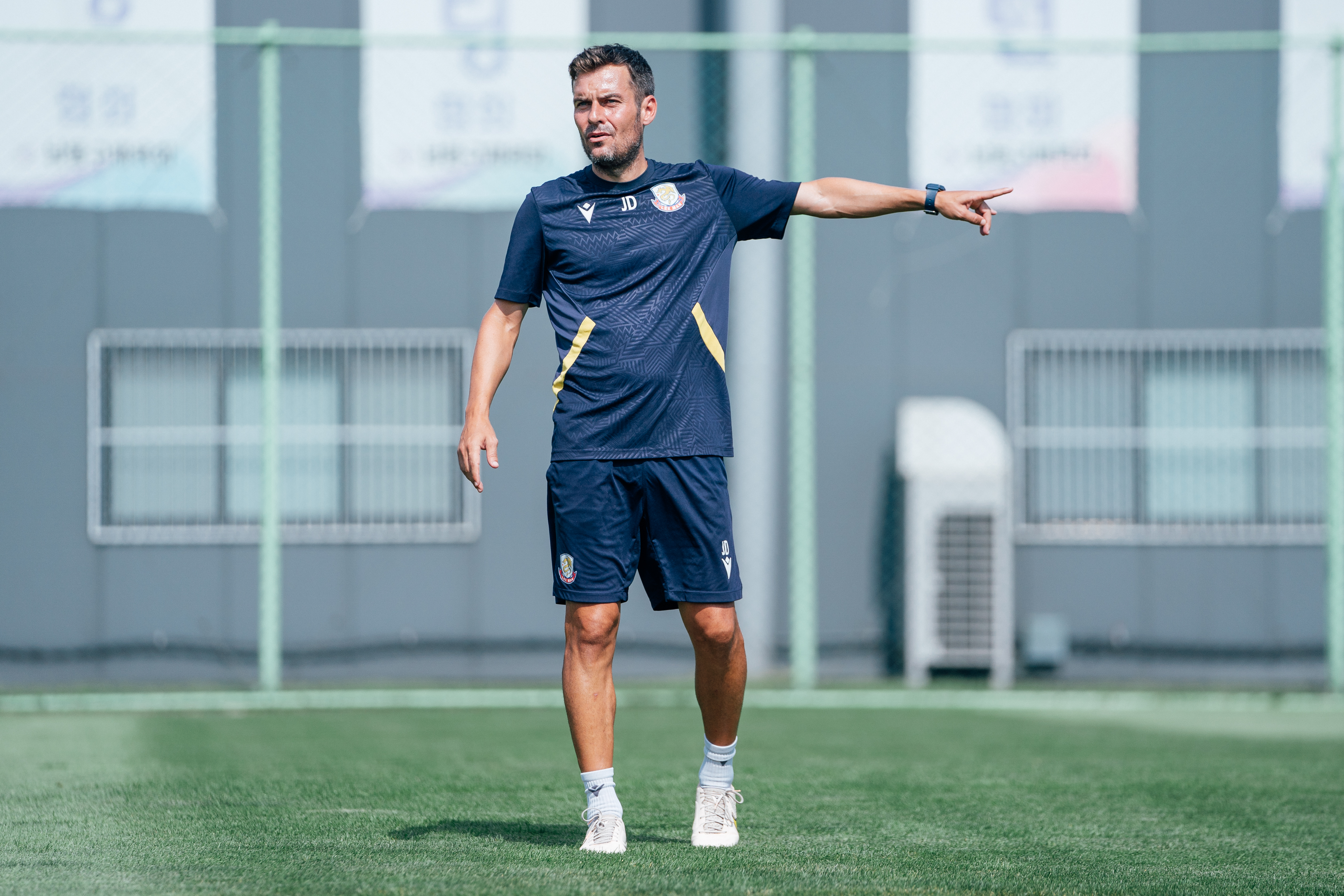
- Tarrés with Lee Man in 2023

Personal information
- Full name: Jordi Tarrés Páramo
- Date of birth: 16 March 1981 (age 45)
- Place of birth: Barcelona, Spain
- Height: 1.79 m (5 ft 10 in)
- Position: Forward

Team information
- Current team: Kitchee (technical director)

Youth career
- Espanyol

Senior career*
Years	Team	Apps	(Gls)
1997–1999	Igualada	2	(0)
1999–2002	Espanyol B	25	(2)
2001	→ Cornellà (loan)	20	(8)
2002–2004	Sabadell	73	(26)
2004–2005	Hércules	15	(3)
2005–2007	Terrassa	62	(11)
2007–2008	Lorca Deportiva	28	(2)
2008–2009	Espanyol B	19	(10)
2009–2010	Hospitalet	20	(12)
2010–2019	Kitchee	100	(50)
2016–2017	→ Hong Kong Rangers (loan)	18	(13)
2017–2018	→ Lee Man (loan)	3	(1)
2019–2020	Lee Man	7	(1)
Total		392	(139)

International career
2018	Hong Kong U23	4	(2)
2006	Catalonia	1	(0)
2017–2018	Hong Kong	5	(2)

Managerial career
- 2020–2021: Lee Man (assistant)
- 2022–2024: Lee Man (assistant)
- * Club domestic league appearances and goals

Jordi Tarrés Páramo (alternately Jorge Tarrés Páramo, Chinese: 佐迪; born 16 March 1981) is a former professional footballer who played as a forward. He is currently the technical director of Hong Kong Premier League club Kitchee's academy.

He spent most of his professional career with Kitchee in Hong Kong after signing in 2010, eventually going on to represent that national team in 2017. He amassed Segunda División B totals of 203 games and 44 goals over eight seasons during his spell in his native Spain.

== Club career ==
=== Spain ===
Tarrés was born in Barcelona, Catalonia to Isidoro Tarrés, a footballer who represented FC Barcelona amongst other clubs. The son was a youth product of Espanyol and also appeared for its reserves in the third level, mostly representing teams in his native region.

In his country, Tarrés never competed in higher than Segunda División B, starting off with Igualada in the Tercera División. In the former tier he played with Sabadell, Hércules, Terrassa and Lorca Deportiva.

=== Kitchee ===
Tarrés signed for Kitchee on 26 July 2010, being the second Spaniard to join the Hong Kong side after Fernando Recio. In his first season the club won the First Division League after 47 years, and he was also crowned top scorer alongside Makhosonke Bhengu of Fourway Athletics. He also scored four goals in the 2012 AFC Cup group stage, helping the team to win their group and progress to the last-16 stage of the tournament.

On 1 May 2013, Tarrés scored a hat-trick against Warriors to become top scorer in the 2013 AFC Cup group stage with ten goals, finding the net in at all group-stage games and equalling Julius Akosah's record for a Hong Kong club in the same competition. The following day, Kitchee general manager Ken Ng confirmed that he had signed a new two-year contract.

From 2016 to 2018, Tarrés served season-long loans at fellow Premier League sides Rangers and Lee Man. On 9 January 2018, he was recalled by Kitchee ahead of their 2018 AFC Champions League campaign.

On 25 May 2019, it was announced that the 38-year-old Tarrés would be leaving the Mong Kok Stadium after nine years.

=== Lee Man ===
Tarrés returned to Lee Man on 19 July 2019, rejoining the club after his previous loan stint. On 11 October 2020, having become a UEFA Pro Licence holder, he announced his retirement and was named their assistant coach.

=== Return to Kitchee ===
Tarrés returned to Kitchee in July 2024, being appointed technical director of the football academy.

== International career ==
Tarrés received his Hong Kong passport in October 2017 at the age of 36, alongside his compatriots Dani Cancela and Fernando Recio. He made his debut for the national team on 5 October, scoring one goal in a 4–0 friendly win over Laos.

== Career statistics ==
=== Club ===
Club	Season	League			Cup		Continental		Other		Total	
Club	Season	Division	Apps	Goals	Apps	Goals	Apps	Goals	Apps	Goals	Apps	Goals
Espanyol B	2000–01	Segunda División B	6	0	—				0	0	6	0
Espanyol B	2001–02	Segunda División B	19	2	—				1	0	20	2
Espanyol B	Total		25	2	—				1	0	26	2
Sabadell	2002–03	Segunda División B	36	15	0	0	—		0	0	36	15
Sabadell	2003–04	Segunda División B	37	11	3	2	—		2	1	42	14
Sabadell	Total		73	26	3	2	—		2	1	78	29
Hércules	2004–05	Segunda División B	15	3	0	0	—				15	3
Terrassa	2005–06	Segunda División B	32	6	1	0	—				33	6
Terrassa	2006–07	Segunda División B	30	5	1	0	—				31	5
Terrassa	Total		62	11	2	0	—				64	11
Lorca	2007–08	Segunda División B	28	2	0	0	—				28	2
Espanyol B	2008–09	Tercera División	19	10	—						19	10
Hospitalet	2009–10	Tercera División	20	12	1	0	—				21	12
Kitchee	2010–11	Hong Kong First Division	15	12	3	0	—				18	12
Kitchee	2011–12	Hong Kong First Division	16	9	4	2	7	4	—		27	15
Kitchee	2012–13	Hong Kong First Division	13	7	6	0	9	12	—		28	19
Kitchee	2013–14	Hong Kong First Division	17	9	5	2	6	3	—		28	14
Kitchee	2014–15	Hong Kong Premier League	15	7	8	5	11	2	—		34	14
Kitchee	2015–16	Hong Kong Premier League	10	3	7	4	6	2	—		17	7
Kitchee	Total		86	47	33	13	33	21	—		152	81
Rangers (loan)	2016–17	Hong Kong Premier League	18	13	2	0	—				20	13
Lee Man (loan)	2017–18	Hong Kong Premier League	3	1	3	0	—				6	1
Kitchee	2017–18	Hong Kong Premier League	4	1	0	0	3	0	—		7	1
Kitchee	2018–19	Hong Kong Premier League	10	2	4	1	5	2	—		19	5
Kitchee	Total		14	3	4	1	8	2	—		26	6
Lee Man	2019–20	Hong Kong Premier League	7	1	3	0	—				10	1
Career total			370	131	51	16	41	23	3	1	465	171

=== International ===
National team	Year	Apps	Goals
Hong Kong	2017	4	2
Hong Kong	2018	1	0
Total		5	2

Scores and results list Hong Kong's goal tally first, score column indicates score after each Tarrés goal.

No	Date	Venue	Opponent	Score	Result	Competition
1.	5 October 2017	Mong Kok Stadium, Mong Kok, Hong Kong	Laos	1–0	4–0	Friendly
2.	10 October 2017	Hong Kong Stadium, Wanchai, Hong Kong	Malaysia	1–0	2–0	2019 AFC Asian Cup qualification

== Honours ==
Kitchee

- Hong Kong Premier League: 2014–15, 2017–18
- Hong Kong First Division League: 2010–11, 2011–12, 2013–14
- Hong Kong Senior Challenge Shield: 2018–19
- Hong Kong FA Cup: 2011–12, 2012–13, 2017–18, 2018–19
- Hong Kong Sapling Cup: 2017–18
- Hong Kong League Cup: 2011–12

Individual

- Hong Kong First Division League Golden Boot: 2010–11
- Hong Kong First Division League Team of the Year: 2010–11, 2011–12, 2012–13
- Hong Kong First Division League Player of the Month: January 2012, May 2012, May 2013
