= Guo Jianqiao =

Chinese footballer

Guo Jianqiao 郭劍橋
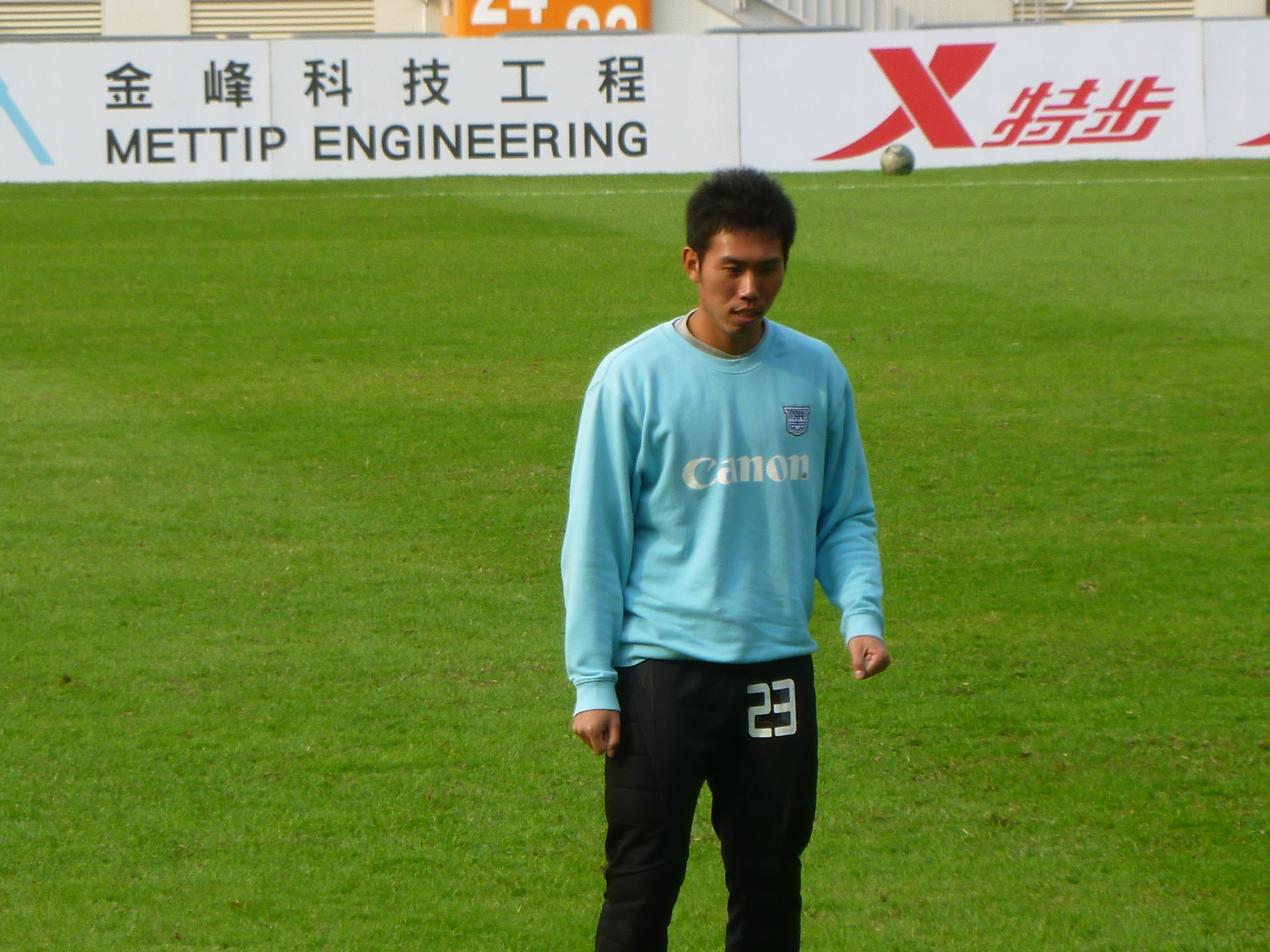

Personal information
- Full name: Guo Jianqiao
- Date of birth: 20 July 1986 (age 40)
- Place of birth: China
- Height: 1.88 m (6 ft 2 in)
- Position: Goalkeeper

Team information
- Current team: Kitchee (goalkeeping coach)

Youth career
- 200?–2007: Changchun Yatai

Senior career*
Years	Team	Apps	(Gls)
2008–2009	Happy Valley	3	(0)
2010–2011	Tai Chung	14	(0)
2011–2022	Kitchee	32	(0)
2022–2023	St. Joseph's	7	(0)
2023–2025	Double Flower	10	(1)
2025	Orion		
2025–	Double Flower		

Managerial career
- 2023–: Kitchee (goalkeeping coach)
- * Club domestic league appearances and goals as of 1 July 2024

Guo Jianqiao (Chinese: 郭劍橋, born 20 July 1986) is a Chinese former professional footballer who played as a goalkeeper. He is currently the goalkeeping coach of Hong Kong Premier League club Kitchee.

== Club career ==
Guo was part of the Changchun Yatai youth system.

In 2008, Guo signed for Hong Kong First Division League club Happy Valley.

In 2010, Guo signed for Hong Kong First Division League club Tai Chung.

In 2011, Guo signed for Hong Kong First Division League club Kitchee.

On 1 July 2022, after 11 years with Kitchee, Guo announced his retirement from professional football.

== Honours ==
=== Club ===
Kitchee

- Hong Kong Premier League: 2014–15, 2016–17, 2017–18, 2019–20
- Hong Kong First Division: 2011–12, 2013–14
- Hong Kong Senior Shield: 2016–17, 2018–19
- Hong Kong FA Cup: 2011–12, 2012–13, 2014–15, 2016–17, 2017–18, 2018–19
- Hong Kong Sapling Cup: 2017–18, 2019–20
- Hong Kong League Cup: 2011–12, 2014–15, 2015–16
