= Lo Kwan Yee =

Hong Kong footballer (born 1984)

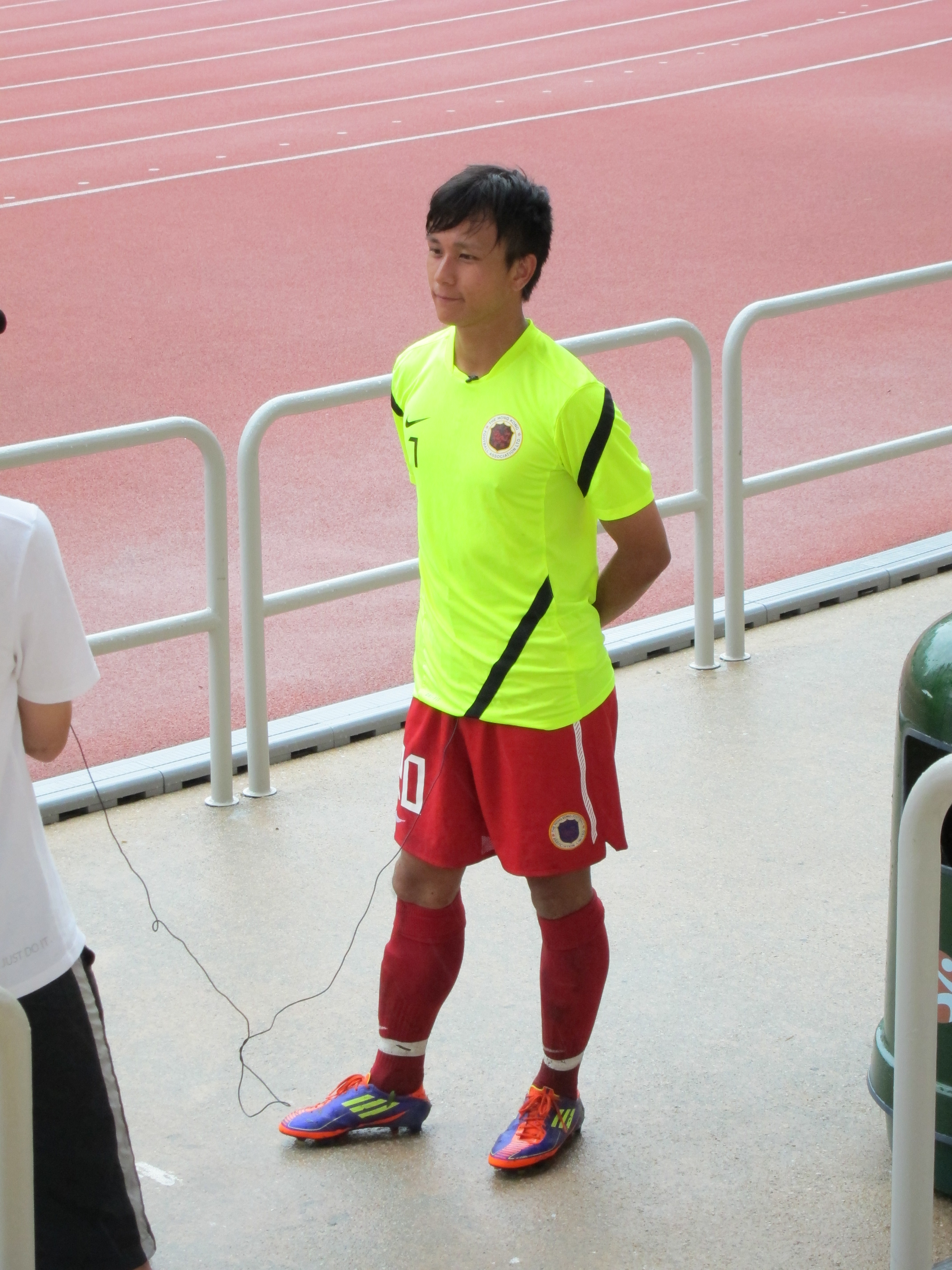
- Lo playing for Hong Kong in 2011

Personal information
- Full name: Lo Kwan Yee
- Date of birth: 9 October 1984 (age 42)
- Place of birth: Hong Kong
- Height: 1.67 m (5 ft 6 in)
- Positions: Midfielder; right back

Youth career
- 1995–1997: Hong Kong Sports Institute
- 1997–1999: Rangers (HKG)

Senior career*
Years	Team	Apps	(Gls)
1999–2007	Rangers (HKG)	137	(15)
2007–2018	Kitchee	168	(14)
2018–2020	R&F	30	(1)
2020–2024	Rangers (HKG)	55	(7)
2024	Supreme	1	(0)
2024–2025	Citizen	21	(5)
2025–2026	Supreme	25	(7)

International career
2000–2003	Hong Kong U-20		
2003–2010	Hong Kong U-23		
2007–2017	Hong Kong	53	(9)

Managerial career
- 2023–2024: Citizen
- 2024–2025: Citizen (player-manager)
- 2024–2026: Rangers (HKG) (assistant coach)
- * Club domestic league appearances and goals as of 17 May 2026

Lo Kwan Yee (Chinese: 盧均宜; Jyutping: lou^{4} gwan^{1} ji^{4}, born 9 October 1984) is a former Hong Kong professional footballer who played as a midfielder or a right back and a current football coach.

== Club career ==
=== Rangers ===
Lo broke into the Rangers first team at only 15 years old. He made his first-team debut as a substitute in Rangers' 1–0 win at home to Kitchee on 14 August 2000, scoring the match winner in the 88th minute. The midfielder became the youngest-ever player to play in the First Division at 15 years and 309 days.

=== Kitchee ===
On 2 July 2007, Lo signed for Kitchee after his 8-year spell with Rangers, signing a one-year deal, with an option of another one-year extension. He was given the number 12 shirt.

On 2 September 2007, Lo made his league debut for Kitchee against rivals South China, ending in a 2–1 victory. Lo suffered from hepatitis after the match and was kept out of first-team action for eight weeks. Lo then scored a goal in the Senior Shield Final 2007–08 against Eastern on 23 December 2007, which eventually ended in a 3–1 victory for Eastern.

In the 2010–11 season, Lo played as right back for Kitchee. On 23 September 2010, in the 6:0 win over HKFC, Lo was kicked in the head from goalkeeper Rudolf Karel Hollaender after scoring the second goal and had to be substituted. He received two stitches on his left ear. At the end of the season, he helped the club win the league title by 1 point over South China. This was the club's first league title in 47 years, allowing the club to compete in the 2011 Barclays Asia Trophy and 2012 AFC Cup.

Ken Ng of Kitchee announced on 2 August 2011 that he has taken disciplinary action against Lo for playing in a local soccer game without the club's consent, by stripping him of the club's captaincy. Further actions may follow.

On 26 May 2018, Lo made his final appearance for Kitchee as the club won the 2017–18 Hong Kong FA Cup.

=== R&F ===
On 4 June 2018, it was reported that after ten years with Kitchee, Lo had signed with fellow Hong Kong Premier League side R&F. On 9 July 2018, Lo confirmed to the media that he had signed a two-year contract with R&F. He was sent off in his first appearance for the club against Eastern at Hong Kong Stadium.

On 28 June 2020, Lo confirmed to the media that he had signed a new one-year contract to remain at R&F.

=== Rangers ===
Following R&F's decision to withdraw from the HKPL in the new season, Lo decided to return to Rangers after 13 years. On 16 May 2021, in his 20th game for Rangers in the 2020–21 season, he scored a 40 yards volley goal in a HKPL match against Resources Capital.

On 13 March 2024, Lo announced his retirement from professional football at the end of the 2023–24 season.

== International career ==
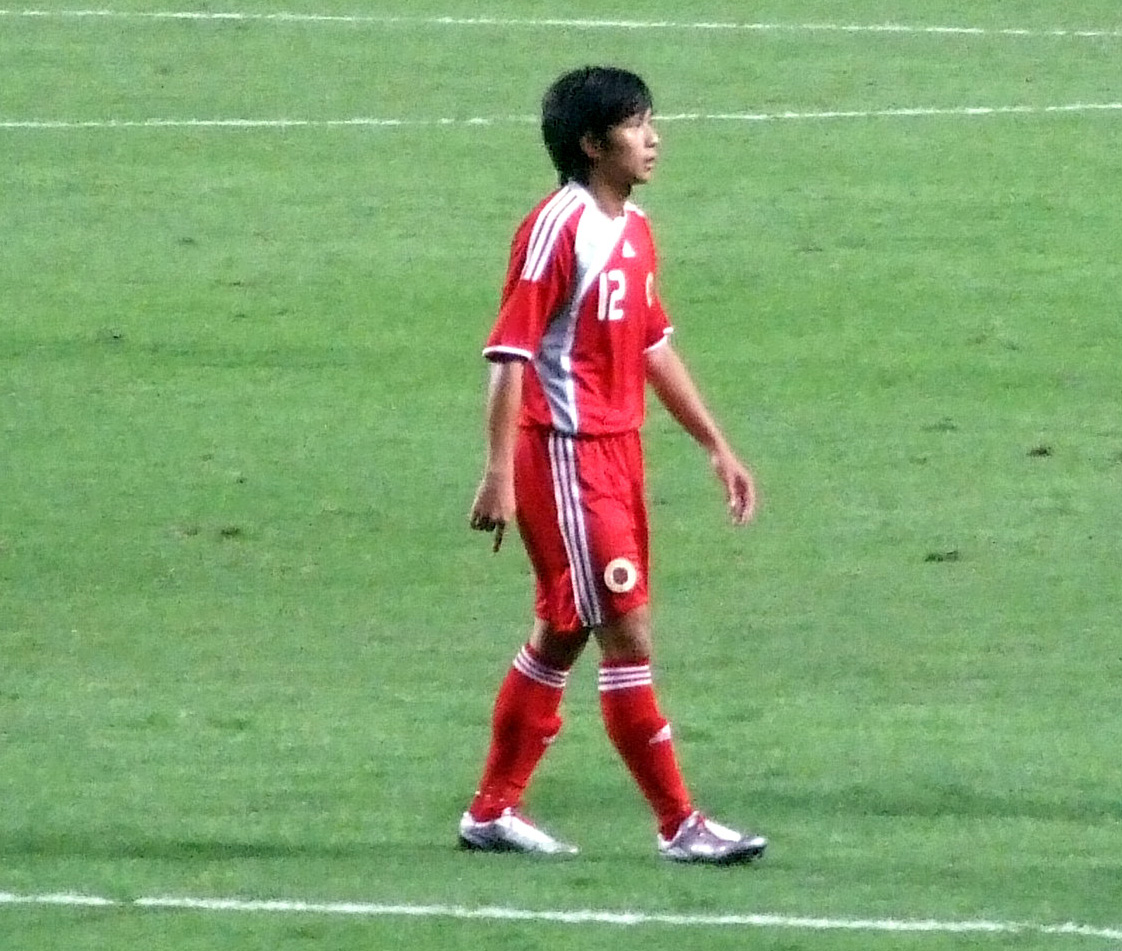
Lo playing for Hong Kong against Japan in 2010

Lo has represented Hong Kong on the international level at various age groups.

On 19 June 2007, Lo made his international debut for the senior national team in the Preliminary Competition of 2008 East Asian Football Championship against Chinese Taipei.

== Personal life ==
Lo graduated from Ju Ching Chu Secondary School in Kwai Chung. His favourite player is Japanese midfielder Shinji Ono and he supports Liverpool. He has a nickname Hong Kong Messi because of his various and magical technique also his height, body size and playing style. Lo has a C-grade football coaching license. He volunteered to coach his former school's pupils.

Lo has a motorcycle license and he owns a Suzuki Skywave 400 s-Type. But since 2010 he has stopped riding motorcycles.

On 20 May 2012, Lo won his girlfriend Canmy's hand in marriage with 99 roses and a ring after Kitchee beat Rangers 4–1 and successfully defended its league title.

In June 2026, Lo was one of the nineteen people arrested in a massive joint operation by police and anti corruption officials that involved local match fixing and illegal World Cup bettings.

== Career statistics ==
=== International ===
As of 7 June 2017

National team	Year	Apps	Goals
Hong Kong	2007	6	3
Hong Kong	2008	0	0
Hong Kong	2009	4	0
Hong Kong	2010	5	2
Hong Kong	2011	7	1
Hong Kong	2012	10	0
Hong Kong	2013	5	0
Hong Kong	2014	5	1
Hong Kong	2015	6	1
Hong Kong	2016	4	1
Hong Kong	2017	1	0
Total		53	9

#	Date	Venue	Opponent	Result	Scored	Captain	Competition
1	19 June 2007	Estádio Campo Desportivo, Macau	Chinese Taipei	1–1	0		2008 EAFF Championship Preliminary
2	21 June 2007	Estádio Campo Desportivo, Macau	Guam	15–1	2		2008 EAFF Championship Preliminary
3	24 June 2007	Estádio Campo Desportivo, Macau	North Korea	0–1	0		2008 EAFF Championship Preliminary
4	28 October 2007	Hong Kong Stadium, Hong Kong	Timor-Leste	8–1	1		2010 FIFA World Cup qualification
5	10 November 2007	Hong Kong Stadium, Hong Kong	Turkmenistan	0–0	0		2010 FIFA World Cup qualification
6	18 November 2007	Olympic Stadium, Ashgabat, Turkmenistan	Turkmenistan	0–3	0		2010 FIFA World Cup qualification
7	14 January 2009	Hong Kong Stadium, Hong Kong	India	2–1	0		Friendly
8	28 January 2009	Ali Muhesen Stadium, Sanaa, Yemen	Yemen	0–1	0		2011 AFC Asian Cup qualification
9	9 October 2009	Outsourcing Stadium, Shizuoka, Japan	Japan	0–6	0		2011 AFC Asian Cup qualification
10	18 November 2009	Hong Kong Stadium, Hong Kong	Japan	0–4	0		2011 AFC Asian Cup qualification
11	4 October 2010	Balewadi Stadium, Pune, India	India	1–0	0		Friendly
12	9 October 2010	Kaohsiung National Stadium, Kaohsiung	Philippines	4–2	0		2010 Long Teng Cup
13	10 October 2010	Kaohsiung National Stadium, Kaohsiung	Macau	4–0	1		2010 Long Teng Cup
14	12 October 2010	Kaohsiung National Stadium, Kaohsiung	Chinese Taipei	1–1	1	(c)	2010 Long Teng Cup
15	17 November 2010	Hong Kong Stadium, Hong Kong	Paraguay	0–7	0		Friendly
16	9 February 2011	Shah Alam Stadium, Kuala Lumpur	Malaysia	0–2	0		Friendly
17	3 June 2011	Siu Sai Wan Sports Ground, Hong Kong	Malaysia	1–1	0	(c)	Friendly
18	23 July 2011	Prince Mohamed bin Fahd Stadium, Dammam	Saudi Arabia	0–3	0		2014 FIFA World Cup qualification
19	28 July 2011	Siu Sai Wan Sports Ground, Hong Kong	Saudi Arabia	0–5	0		2014 FIFA World Cup qualification
20	30 September 2011	Kaohsiung National Stadium, Kaohsiung, Taiwan	Philippines	3–3	0		2011 Long Teng Cup
21	2 October 2011	Kaohsiung National Stadium, Kaohsiung, Taiwan	Macau	5–1	0		2011 Long Teng Cup
22	4 October 2011	Kaohsiung National Stadium, Kaohsiung, Taiwan	Chinese Taipei	6–0	1		2011 Long Teng Cup
23	29 February 2012	Mong Kok Stadium, Hong Kong	Chinese Taipei	5–1	0		Friendly
24	1 June 2012	Hong Kong Stadium, Hong Kong	Singapore	1–0	0		Friendly
25	10 June 2012	Mong Kok Stadium, Hong Kong	Vietnam	1–2	0		Friendly
26	15 August 2012	Jurong West Stadium, Singapore	Singapore	0–2	0	(c)	Friendly
27	16 October 2012	Mong Kok Stadium, Mong Kok, Kowloon	Malaysia	0–3	0	(c)	Friendly
28	14 November 2012	Shah Alam Stadium, Shah Alam, Malaysia	Malaysia	1–1	0		Friendly
29	1 December 2012	Mong Kok Stadium, Mong Kok, Hong Kong	Guam	2–1	0		2013 EAFF East Asian Cup Preliminary Competition Round 2
30	3 December 2012	Mong Kok Stadium, Mong Kok, Hong Kong	Australia	0–1	0		2013 EAFF East Asian Cup Preliminary Competition Round 2
31	7 December 2012	Hong Kong Stadium, So Kon Po, Hong Kong	Chinese Taipei	2–0	0		2013 EAFF East Asian Cup Preliminary Competition Round 2
32	9 December 2012	Hong Kong Stadium, So Kon Po, Hong Kong	North Korea	0–4	0		2013 EAFF East Asian Cup Preliminary Competition Round 2
33	6 February 2013	Pakhtakor Stadium, Uzbekistan	Uzbekistan	0–0	0		2015 AFC Asian Cup qualification
34	4 June 2013	Mong Kok Stadium, Mong Kok, Hong Kong	Philippines	0–1	0		Friendly
35	15 October 2013	Hong Kong Stadium, So Kon Po, Hong Kong	United Arab Emirates	0–4	0		2015 AFC Asian Cup qualification
36	15 November 2013	Mohammed Bin Zayed Stadium, Abu Dhabi, United Arab Emirates	United Arab Emirates	0–4	0		2015 AFC Asian Cup qualification
37	19 November 2013	Hong Kong Stadium, So Kon Po, Hong Kong	Uzbekistan	0–2	0		2015 AFC Asian Cup qualification
38	5 March 2014	Mỹ Đình National Stadium, Từ Liêm District, Hanoi, Vietnam	Vietnam	1–3	1		2015 AFC Asian Cup qualification
39	6 September 2014	Lạch Tray Stadium, Hai Phong, Vietnam	Vietnam	1–3	0		Friendly
40	9 September 2014	Hougang Stadium, Hougang, Singapore	Singapore	0–0	0		Friendly
41	14 October 2014	Hong Kong Stadium, Hong Kong	Argentina	0–7	0		Friendly
42	16 November 2014	Taipei Municipal Stadium, Taipei, Taiwan	Chinese Taipei	1–0	0		2015 EAFF East Asian Cup preliminary round 2
43	11 June 2015	Mong Kok Stadium, Hong Kong	Bhutan	7–0	1		2018 FIFA World Cup qualification – AFC second round
44	16 June 2015	Mong Kok Stadium, Hong Kong	Maldives	2–0	0		2018 FIFA World Cup qualification – AFC second round
45	8 September 2015	Mong Kok Stadium, Hong Kong	Qatar	2–3	0		2018 FIFA World Cup qualification – AFC second round
46	9 October 2015	Rajamangala Stadium, Bangkok, Thailand	Thailand	0–1	0		Friendly
47	13 October 2015	Changlimithang Stadium, Thimphu, Bhutan	Bhutan	1–0	0		2018 FIFA World Cup qualification – AFC second round
48	7 November 2015	Mong Kok Stadium, Hong Kong	Myanmar	5–0	0		Friendly
49	1 September 2016	Mong Kok Stadium, Hong Kong	Cambodia	4–2	1		Friendly
50	6 October 2016	Olympic Stadium, Phnom Penh, Cambodia	Cambodia	2–0	0		Friendly
51	11 October 2016	Mong Kok Stadium, Hong Kong	Singapore	2–0	0		Friendly
52	9 November 2016	Mong Kok Stadium, Hong Kong	Chinese Taipei	4–2	0		EAFF E-1 Football Championship 2017 Round 2
53	7 June 2017	Mong Kok Stadium, Hong Kong	Jordan	0–0	0		Friendly

== Honours ==
Kitchee

- Hong Kong Premier League: 2014–15, 2016–17, 2017–18
- Hong Kong First Division: 2010–11, 2011–12, 2013–14
- Hong Kong Senior Shield: 2016–17
- Hong Kong FA Cup: 2011–12, 2012–13, 2014–15, 2016–17, 2017–18
- Hong Kong Sapling Cup: 2017–18
- Hong Kong League Cup: 2011–12, 2014–15, 2015–16

Rangers

- Hong Kong Sapling Cup: 2023–24

Individual

- Hong Kong Footballer of the Year: 2011–12
- Team of the Season: 2010–11, 2011–12
