= 2011–12 in Hong Kong football =

Football in Hong Kong
- Season: 2011–12

Men's football
- First Division: Kitchee
- Second Division: Mettip
- Third A Division: Eastern
- Third District Division: Tsuen Wan
- Senior Shield: Sunray Cave JC Sun Hei
- FA Cup: Kitchee
- League Cup: Kitchee
- Junior Shield: Wanchai

The 2011–12 season in Hong Kong football, starting in July 2011 and ending in June 2012.

The season began on 3 September 2011 for the First Division League and the Second Division League, on 17 September 2011 for the Third A Division League and 25 September 2011 for the Third District Division League. The Third District Division League ended on 15 March 2012 and the Third A Division League ended on 25 March 2012. The top two teams of Third A Division League and the Third A Division League were qualified for the Third Division League Final Round. The Final Round started on 1 April 2012 and ended on 15 April 2012. The Second Division League ended on 15 April 2012 and the First Division League ended on 20 May 2012.

== Honours ==
=== Trophy & League Champions ===
Competition	Winner	Details	At	Match Report
Senior Shield	Sunray Cave JC Sun Hei	2011–12 Hong Kong Senior Shield beat South China 5–3 on penalties (1–1 after extra time)	Hong Kong Stadium	Report
Hong Kong FA Cup	Kitchee	2011–12 Hong Kong FA Cup beat TSW Pegasus 5–3 on penalties (3–3 after extra time)	Hong Kong Stadium	Report
League Cup	Kitchee	2011–12 Hong Kong League Cup beat TSW Pegasus 2–1	Mong Kok Stadium	Report
First Division League	Kitchee	2011–12 Hong Kong First Division League	Tseung Kwan O Sports Ground	Report
Second Division League	Kam Fung	2011–12 Football League Championship	Shek Kip Mei Park	Report
Third A Division League	Eastern	2011–12 Hong Kong Third Division League	Kwong Fuk Park Football Pitch	Report
Third District Division League	Tsuen Wan	2011–12 Hong Kong Third Division League	Po Kong Village Park Pitch	Report
Junior Shield	Wanchai	2011–12 Hong Kong Junior Shield beat Happy Valley 3–0	Hong Kong Stadium	Report

== Representative team ==
=== Hong Kong ===
==== 2014 FIFA World Cup qualification ====
Hong Kong had gone through their 2014 FIFA World Cup qualifying campaign, where they were knocked out in the Second Round by Saudi Arabia

===== Second round =====
July 13, 2011 1st leg	Saudi Arabia	3 – 0	Hong Kong	Dammam, Saudi Arabia
20:45 (UTC+3)	Al-Shamrani 45+1', 47'; Al-Muwalled 45+3'	Report(FIFA); Report(HKFA)		Stadium: Prince Mohamed bin Fahd Stadium; Attendance: 20,354; Referee: Vladislav Tseylin (Uzbekistan); Assistant referees: Rafael Ilyasov(Uzbekistan); Jakhongir Saidov (Uzbekistan); Fourth official: Vadim Agishev (Uzbekistan)

Match Detail

Saudi Arabia	Hong Kong

SAUDI ARABIA:
GK	22	Hassan Al-Otaibi
RB	5	Osama Al-Muwallad
CB	12	Hassan Fallatah	(yellow card) 28'
CB	3	Osama Hawsawi
LB	2	Abdullah Shuhail
CM	6	Ahmed Otaif
CM	8	Mohammed Noor (c)	(substituted off) 78'
CM	17	Taisir Al-Jassim
ST	14	Yousef Al-Salem	(substituted off) 84'
ST	11	Nasser Al-Shamrani
ST	10	Nawaf Al Abed	(yellow card) 58'
Substitutes:
GK	1	Waleed Abdullah
DF	4	Hamad Al-Montashari
DF	7	Hamad Al-Montashari	(substituted on) 78'
FW	9	Mohammad Al-Sahlawi
MF	13	Moataz Al-Musa
MF	15	Saud Hamood	(substituted on) 84'
MF	16	Ibrahim Ghaleb
MF	18	Sultan Al-Numare
DF	19	Mishaal Al-Saeed
DF	20	Waleed Jahdali
GK	21	Yasser Al-Mosailem
DF	23	Rashed Al-Raheeb
Coach:
Frank Rijkaard (Netherlands)

HONG KONG:
GK	1	Yapp Hung Fai
RB	2	Sham Kwok Fai		(yellow card) 12'
CB	2	Lee Chi Ho	(yellow card) 26'
CB	15	Chan Wai Ho (c)
LB	6	Chak Ting Fung	(yellow card) 45+3'	(substituted off) 52'
DM	16	Leung Chun Pong
CM	14	Chu Siu Kei		(substituted off) 62'
CM	12	Lo Kwan Yee
RW	9	Lee Wai Lim		(substituted off) 84'
LW	21	Kwok Kin Pong
ST	7	Chan Siu Ki	(yellow card) 48'
Substitutions:
GK	18	Tse Tak Him
GK	19	Wei Zhao
DF	4	Li Hang Wui
DF	5	So Wai Chuen		(substituted on) 62'
MF	8	Lee Hong Lim		(substituted on) 52'
ST	11	Chao Pengfei
DF	13	Cheung Kin Fung
ST	20	Ye Jia		(substituted on) 84'
Manager:
(Hong Kong) Liu Chun Fai

July 13, 2011 2nd leg	Hong Kong	0 – 5	Saudi Arabia	Siu Sai Wan, Hong Kong
20:00 (UTC+/)		Report(FIFA); Report(HKFA)	34' Fallatah; 71' (pen.) Noor; 73' Al-Shamrani; 79' Ai-Sahlawi; 90+3' Hawsawi	Stadium: Siu Sai Wan Sports Ground; Attendance: 1,402; Referee: Võ Minh Trí (Vietnam); Assistant referees: Nguyen Ngoc Ha (Vietnam); Nguyen Hoang Minh (Vietnam); Fourth official: Phung Dinh Dung (Vietnam)

Match Detail

Hong Kong	Saudi Arabia

HONG KONG:
GK	1	Yapp Hung Fai
RB	2	Lee Chi Ho		(substituted off) 81'
CB	5	So Wai Chuen
CB	15	Chan Wai Ho (c)		(yellow card) 70'
LB	13	Wong Chin Hung		(yellow card) 45+3'
DM	16	Leung Chun Pong		Red card
CM	12	Lo Kwan Yee
RW	9	Lee Wai Lim		(substituted off) 77'
LW	21	Kwok Kin Pong		(yellow card) 90+3'
CF	20	Ye Jia		(substituted off) 77'
ST	7	Chan Siu Ki	(yellow card) 68'
Substitutions:
GK	18	Tse Tak Him
GK	19	Wei Zhao
DF	4	Li Hang Wui
DF	6	Chak Ting Fung
MF	8	Lee Hong Lim		(substituted on) 77'
ST	11	Chao Pengfei
DF	22	Sham Kwok Fai		(substituted on) 81'
ST	23	Chu Siu Kei		(substituted on) 77'
Manager:
(Hong Kong) Liu Chun Fai

SAUDI ARABIA:
GK	22	Hassan Al-Otaibi		(yellow card) 85'
RB	5	Osama Al-Muwallad	(yellow card) 68'	(substituted on) 72'
CB	12	Hassan Fallatah
CB	3	Osama Hawsawi
LB	2	Abdullah Shuhail
CM	6	Ahmed Otaif		(substituted off) 75'
CM	8	Mohammed Noor (c)
CM	17	Taisir Al-Jassim
ST	14	Yousef Al-Salem		(substituted off) 67'
ST	11	Nasser Al-Shamrani		(yellow card) 3'
ST	10	Nawaf Al Abed		(yellow card) 10'
Substitutes:
GK	1	Waleed Abdullah
DF	4	Hamad Al-Montashari		(substituted on) 72'
DF	7	Hamad Al-Montashari
FW	9	Mohammad Al-Sahlawi	(yellow card) 69'	(substituted on) 67'
MF	13	Moataz Al-Musa
MF	15	Saud Hamood
MF	16	Ibrahim Ghaleb		(substituted on) 75'
MF	18	Sultan Al-Numare
DF	19	Mishaal Al-Saeed
DF	20	Waleed Jahdali
GK	21	Yasser Al-Mosailem
DF	23	Rashed Al-Raheeb
Coach:
Frank Rijkaard (Netherlands)

==== Long Teng Cup ====
This is a tournament was organized by Chinese Taipei Football Association and take place in Kaohsiung, Taiwan from 30 September to 4 October 2011. Another three participating teams is Chinese Taipei, the Philippines and Macau. This year, Hong Kong sent their senior teams, as did another three associations. FIFA ensured that these 3 matches are the formal international matches after the tournament.

The first match of Hong Kong team was against the Philippines on 30 September. Hong Kong was leading 2 goals before being scored 3 goals. Au Yeung Yiu Chung scored the equalizer before the end of the match. Hong Kong then won the following matches by winning Macau and Chinese Taipei 5–1 and 6–0 respectively. Hong Kong won the 2011 Long Teng Cup by getting 7 points in the competition.

==== 2012 Guangdong–Hong Kong Cup ====
This is a tournament between two teams representing Hong Kong and Guangdong Province of China respectively. This year, Hong Kong had chosen 3 non-Hong Kong born player who are or will soon be able to represent Hong Kong. They are Godfred Karikari, Jaimes McKee and Jack Sealy.

The first leg took place in Hong Kong, being held in Hong Kong Stadium. Guangdong scored the first goal, but Hong Kong scored 2 goals, both in headers. However, before the end of the match, Guangdong equalized the match. The second leg took place in Huizhou, Guangdong, being held in Huizhou Olympic Stadium. Both teams could not score any goals in 120 minutes. Both Yapp Hung Fai, goalkeeper of Hong Kong, and Yang Zhi, goalkeeper of Guangdong and the China national team's first choice, saved 2 penalties in the first 5 rounds. In the seventh round, Yapp Hung Fai saved Ge Zheen's penalty, while Man Pei Tak converted to win Hong Kong the cup.

28 December 2011 1st leg	Hong Kong	2 – 2	(China) Guangdong	So Kon Po, Hong Kong
20:00(GMT+8)	Cheng Siu Wai 64'; Godfred 74'	Report	Tan Binliang 27'; Huang Fengtao 90+'	Stadium: Hong Kong Stadium; Attendance: 4,165; Referee: Tong Kui Sum; Assistant referees: Chan Shui Hung; Chow Chun Kit; Fourth official: Liu Kwok Man

Match Detail

Hong Kong	Guangdong

HONG KONG:
GK	1	Yapp Hung Fai
RB	3	Jack Sealy
CB	2	Lee Chi Ho
CB	5	Ng Wai Chiu (c)
LB	13	Cheung Kin Fung		(substituted off) 83'
DM	16	Leung Chun Pong
RM	8	Xu Deshuai		(substituted off) 46'
LM	14	Kwok Kin Pong
AM	12	Lo Kwan Yee
SS	20	Godfred Karikari		(substituted off) 88'
CF	9	Cheng Siu Wai		(substituted off) 82'
Substitutions:
GK	18	Tse Tak Him
DF	4	Man Pei Tak	(yellow card) 90+'	(substituted on) 46'
DF	6	Wong Chin Hung		(substituted on) 83'
MF	10	Lam Ka Wai
MF	21	Lau Nim Yat		(substituted on) 82'
FW	11	Jaimes McKee		(substituted on) 88'
FW	17	Chen Liming
Manager:
Liu Chun Fai

GUANGDONG:
GK	30	Yang Zhi
RB	12	Li Jianhua	(yellow card) 83'	(substituted off) 88'
CB	19	Wang Weilong
CB	5	Yuan Lin
LB	2	Li Yan
CM	6	Ge Zhen	(yellow card) 45'
CM	9	Wu Weian		(substituted off) 80'
AM	18	Yin Hongbo (c)	(yellow card) 90+'
RW	25	Tan Binliang		(substituted off) 67'
LW	23	Lu Lin
CF	13	Shi Liang		(substituted off) 75'
Substitutes:
GK	1	Li Weijun
DF	4	Guo Zichao
DF	20	Zhu Cong		(substituted on) 88'
MF	7	Wu Pingfeng		(substituted on) 67'
MF	15	Zhao Huang		(substituted on) 80'
FW	10	Huang Fengtao		(substituted on) 75'
FW	29	Chang Feiya
Coach:
Cao Yang

1 January 2012 2nd leg	Guangdong (China)	0 – 0 (a.e.t.) (4 – 5 p)	Hong Kong	Huizhou, Guangdong
15:00(GMT+8)		Report		Stadium: Huizhou Olympic Stadium; Attendance: 30,000; Referee: Sun Bing (China PR)
	Penalties
	Yin Hongbo (penalty missed); Li Yan (penalty scored); Zhao Huang (penalty scored); Li Jianhua (penalty missed); Huang Fengtao (penalty scored); Chang Feiya (penalty scored); Ge Zhen (penalty missed)		(penalty scored) Lo Kwan Yee; (penalty missed) Lee Chi Ho; (penalty missed) Leung Chun Pong; (penalty scored) Cheung Kin Fung; (penalty scored) Chan Wai Ho; (penalty scored) Man Pei Tak; (penalty scored) Lam Ka Wai

Match Detail

Guangdong	Hong Kong

GUANGDONG:
GK	30	Yang Zhi
RB	12	Li Jianhua
CB	19	Wang Weilong
CB	5	Yuan Lin
LB	2	Li Yan
CM	6	Ge Zhen
CM	9	Wu Weian	(substituted off) 88'
AM	18	Yin Hongbo (c)
RW	7	Wu Pingfeng	(substituted off) 65'
LW	23	Lu Lin	(substituted off) 91'
CF	13	Shi Liang	(substituted off) 61'
Substitutes:
GK	1	Li Weijun
DF	4	Guo Zichao
DF	20	Zhu Cong
MF	15	Zhao Huang	(substituted on) 88'
MF	25	Tan Binliang	(substituted on) 91'
FW	10	Huang Fengtao	(substituted on) 61'
FW	29	Chang Feiya	(substituted on) 65'
Coach:
Cao Yang

HONG KONG:
GK	1	Yapp Hung Fai
RB	3	Jack Sealy	(yellow card) 12'	(substituted off) 111'
CB	2	Lee Chi Ho	(yellow card) 53'
CB	5	Ng Wai Chiu (c)
LB	6	Wong Chin Hung		(substituted off) 97'
DM	16	Leung Chun Pong
DM	15	Chan Wai Ho
RW	11	Jaimes McKee		(substituted off) 106'
LW	14	Kwok Kin Pong		(substituted off) 90+'
SS	9	Cheng Siu Wai		(substituted off) 62'
CF	20	Godfred Karikari	(yellow card) 120+'
Substitutions:
GK	18	Tse Tak Him
DF	4	Man Pei Tak		(substituted on) 97'
DF	13	Cheung Kin Fung		(substituted on) 90+'
MF	10	Lam Ka Wai		(substituted on) 111'
MF	12	Lo Kwan Yee		(substituted on) 106'
MF	8	Xu Deshuai		(substituted on) 62'
FW	17	Chen Liming
Manager:
Liu Chun Fai

==== Friendly matches in second half season ====
This is the first match for the new head coach Ernie Merrick.

29 February 2012	Hong Kong	5 – 1	Chinese Taipei	Mong Kok Stadium, Hong Kong
20:00 UTC+8	Chan Siu Ki 2', 5', 82'; Lee Hong Lim 16'; Lo Kwan Yee (yellow card) 39'; Chan Man Fai 47'; Chan Wai Ho (yellow card) 87'	(Report)	Kuo Yin-hung 45'; Lin Cheng-yi (yellow card) 55'	Attendance: 5,187

The Hong Kong Football Association organised two friendly match, both will be played in Hong Kong in June. Hong Kong played the first match against Singapore on 1 June 2012.

1 June 2012	Hong Kong	1 – 0	Singapore	Hong Kong Stadium, Hong Kong
20:00 UTC+8	Lam Ka Wai 36'	(Report)	Mustafić (yellow card) 14'	Attendance: 4,285

The second match against Vietnam will be played in Mong Kok Stadium on 10 June 2012.

10 June 2012	Hong Kong	1 – 2	Vietnam	Mong Kok Stadium, Hong Kong
17:30 UTC+8	Au Yeung Yiu Chung 40'; Lee Chi Ho 49'		71' Nguyen Van Quyet; 74' Nguyen Trong Hoang; (yellow card) 79' Nguyen Thanh Binh; (yellow card) 83' Nguyen Viet Thang; (yellow card) 86' Tran Chi Cong

=== Hong Kong U-22 ===
==== 2012 Hong Kong–Macau Interport ====
The 68th Hong Kong–Macau Interport was held at Macau National Stadium, Macau on 16 June 2012. Hong Kong was represented by its under-22 national team. The Hong Kong U-22 captured the champion by winning 3–1 this year.

16 June 2012	Macau	1 – 3	Hong Kong	Taipa, Macau
15:00 UTC+8	Torrao 51' (yellow card) 90'	Report(HKFA); Report(Macau FA)	19' Chan Pak Hang; 74' Lee Ka Yiu; 88' Tsang Kin Fong; (yellow card) 90' Lau Cheuk Hin	Stadium: Macau National Stadium; Referee: Tou Lap Meng

==== 2013 AFC U-22 Asian Cup qualification ====
Hong Kong U-22 will participate in 2013 AFC U-22 Asian Cup qualification from 23 June 2012 to 3 July 2012 in Laos. Hong Kong is in group F along with China PR, North Korea, Cambodia, Laos and Thailand. They will play in a one-round league format and the top two teams of each group will qualify for the tournament proper along with the best third-placed team in all the groups. All the matches of group F is held in Laos.

Team	Pld	W	D	L	GF	GA	GD	Pts
North Korea	5	4	1	0	11	4	+7	13
China	5	3	2	0	12	3	+9	11
Laos	5	2	1	2	7	7	0	7
Thailand	5	2	1	2	11	6	+5	7
Cambodia	5	1	1	3	6	15	−9	4
Hong Kong	5	0	0	5	3	15	−12	0

23 June 2012	Hong Kong	2 – 3	Cambodia	Vientiane, Laos
16:00 UTC+7	Cham Cham Hai (yellow card) 20'; Yuen Tsun Nam 50'; Tsang Kin Fong 90'	Report	10' Suhana; 63' Soksana; (yellow card) 69' Saray; 70' Sothearoth; (yellow card) 90+8' Sokngon	Stadium: Chao Anouvong Stadium; Attendance: 200; Referee: Yu Ming Hsun(Chinese Taipei); Assistant referees: Hsu Min Yu(Chinese Taipei), Jakhongir Saidpv(Uzbekistan); Fourth official: Kim Sang Woo(South Korea)

25 June 2012	China PR	5 – 1	Hong Kong	Vientiane, Laos
16:00 UTC+7	Peng Xinli (yellow card) 32' (goal) 49'; Xu Xin (yellow card) 62' (goal) 80'; Zhang Xizhe 63'; Bi Jinhao 69'; Zheng Kaimu (yellow card) 84' (goal) 90'	Report	22' Lam Hok Hei; (yellow card) 33' Chan Pak Hang; (yellow card) 13' Chan Siu Kwan; (yellow card) 89' Chan Cham Hei	Stadium: Laos National Stadium; Attendance: 150; Referee: Kim Sang Woo(South Korea); Assistant referees: Kim Sung Il(South Korea), Lim Kok Heng(Singapore); Fourth official: Yu Ming Hsun(Chinese Taipei)

28 June 2012	North Korea	1 – 0	Hong Kong	Vientiane, Laos
16:00 UTC+7	Han Song Hyok (yellow card) 23'; Kim Jin Hyok 51'; Mun Hyok (yellow card) 59'	Report	(yellow card) 27' Wong Wai; (yellow card) 77' Li Shu Yeung; (yellow card) 90+1' Ngan Lok Fung	Stadium: Chao Anouvong Stadium; Attendance: 150; Referee: Nagor Amir Noor Mohamed (Malaysia); Assistant referees: Ahmed Ameez (Maldives), Thaufeeq Ibrahim (Maldives); Fourth official: Saleem Ali (Maldives)

30 June 2012	Hong Kong	0 – 2	Laos	Vientiane, Laos
19:00 UTC+7	Wong Yim Kwan (yellow card) 63' (yellow-red card); Chan Cham Hei (yellow card) 88'	Report	(yellow card) 5' Sousadakone; 9' Khonesavanh; (yellow card) 30' Keoviengphet; 57' Sayyabounsou; (yellow card) 80' Sourasay	Stadium: Laos National Stadium; Attendance: 2,000; Referee: Mohammed Abdulla Hassan Mohamed (United Arab Emirates); Assistant referees: Mohamed Aljalaf (United Arab Emirates), Jakhongir Saidov (Uzbekistan); Fourth official: Andre El Haddad(Lebanon)

3 July 2012	Thailand	4 – 0	Hong Kong	Vientiane, Laos
16:00 UTC+7	Thanklang 11'; Anan 14'; Weerawatnodom 24'; Laosangthai 56'	Report		Stadium: Chao Anouvong Stadium; Attendance: 100; Referee: Andre El Haddad (Lebanon); Assistant referees: Thaufeeq Ibrahim (Maldives), Jakhongir Saidov (Uzbekistan; Fourth official: Saleem Ali (Maldives)

=== Hong Kong U-21 ===
==== Friendly against Russia U-19 ====
The match was to celebrate the official opening of the newly renovated Mong Kok Stadium.

15 November 2011	Hong Kong	1 – 2	Russia	Mong Kok Stadium, Hong Kong
19:30 UTC+8	Chan Siu Kwan 50'	(Report)	Andrei Panyukov 24'; Artyom Samsonov 66' (pen.)	Attendance: 5,466

== Exhibition matches ==
=== 2012 Asian Cup ===
2012 Asian Cup, also known as Nikon Asian Cup 2012, is the annual football event held in Hong Kong in Lunar New Year. South China are the host of the tournament. Seongnam Ilhwa Chunma from South Korea, Guangzhou Evergrande from China and Shimizu S-Pulse from Japan are invited to participate in this tournament. Each team will play a semi-final match in the first match day. Losers of semi-final matches will play in the third place match while winners will play in the final in the second match day. Seongnam Ilhwa Chunma are the champions after defeating Shimizu S-Pulse in the final.

2012-01-23 Semi-finals	Guangzhou R&F (China)	1 – 5	(South Korea) Seongnam Ilhwa Chunma	Hong Kong Stadium
16:00 (UTC+08:00)	Zhang Shuo 45+'	Report	Héverton 12'; Han Sang-Woon 29', 37'; Jovančić 45+'; Yun Young-Sun 50'	Attendance: 9,879; Referee: Ng Chiu Kok (Hong Kong)

2012-01-23 Semi-finals	South China (Hong Kong)	1 – 1 (1 – 3 p)	(Japan) Shimizu S-Pulse	Hong Kong Stadium
18:30 (UTC+08:00)	Chan Siu Ki 67'	Report	Takagi 26'	Attendance: 9,879; Referee: Liu Kwok Man (Hong Kong)
	Penalties
	Joel (penalty missed); Wong Chin Hung (penalty scored); Chan Siu Ki (penalty missed); João Emir (penalty missed)		(penalty scored) Ono; (penalty missed) Omae; (penalty scored) Brosque; (penalty missed) Ito; (penalty scored) Takagi

2012-01-26 3rd place match	Guangzhou R&F (China)	1 – 1 (3 – 1 p)	(Hong Kong) South China	Hong Kong Stadium
18:00 (UTC+08:00)	Li Zhe 90+5'	Report	Chan Wai Ho 42'	Attendance: 10,610; Referee: Tong Kui Sum (Hong Kong)
	Penalties
	Lu Lin (penalty scored); Yu Guijun (penalty missed); Xu Bo (penalty scored); Wu Weian (penalty scored)		(penalty scored) Wong Chin Hung; (penalty missed) Au Yeung Yiu Chung; (penalty missed) Leung Chun Pong; (penalty missed) Kežman

2012-01-26 Final	Seongnam Ilhwa Chunma (South Korea)	5 – 1	(Japan) Shimizu S-Pulse	Hong Kong Stadium
20:30 (UTC+08:00)	Éverton Santos 5', 38' (pen.); Héverton 17'; Han Sang-Woon 21'; Lee Chang-Hoon 76'	Report	Ito 68'	Attendance: 10,610; Referee: Ng Kai Lam (Hong Kong)
