= 34th Guangdong–Hong Kong Cup =

34th Guangdong-Hong Kong Cup
- Event: Guangdong-Hong Kong Cup
Hong Kong	Guangdong
2	2
- Hong Kong won 5–4 on penalties

First leg
Hong Kong	Guangdong
2	2
- Date: 28 December 2011
- Venue: Hong Kong Stadium, Hong Kong
- Referee: Tong Kui Sum (Hong Kong)
- Attendance: 4,165
- Weather: Clear night 17 °C (63 °F); 81% humidity

Second leg
Guangdong	Hong Kong
0	0
- Hong Kong won 5–4 on penalties
- Date: 1 January 2012
- Venue: Huizhou Olympic Stadium, Huizhou
- Referee: Sun Bing (China PR)
- Weather: Sunny; 18 °C (64 °F); 49% humidity

The 34th Guangdong-Hong Kong Cup will be held on 28 December 2011 and 1 January 2012. The first leg will be played at Hong Kong Stadium with the second leg to take place at Huizhou Stadium.

== Squads ==
=== Guangdong ===
Manager: Cao Yang

No.	Pos.	Player	Date of birth (age)	Caps	Club
1	GK	Li Weijun	1 December 1981 (aged 30)		(China) Guangdong Sunray Cave
2	MF	Li Yan	19 July 1984 (aged 27)		(China) Guangzhou Evergrande
4	DF	Guo Zichao	25 January 1989 (aged 22)		(China) Guangzhou Evergrande
5	DF	Yuan Lin	26 February 1977 (aged 34)		(China) Shenzhen Ruby
6	DF	Ge Zhen	23 June 1987 (aged 24)		(China) Guangdong Sunray Cave
7	FW	Wu Pingfeng	1 November 1981 (aged 30)		(China) Guangzhou Evergrande
9	MF	Wu Weian	1 September 1981 (aged 30)		(China) Tianjin Teda
10	FW	Huang Fengtao	17 June 1985 (aged 26)		(China) Shenzhen Ruby
12	DF	Li Jianhua	12 February 1982 (aged 29)		(China) Guangzhou Evergrande
13	FW	Shi Liang	11 May 1989 (aged 22)		(China) Guangdong Sunray Cave
15	MF	Zhao Huang	2 January 1989 (aged 22)		(China) Guangdong Sunray Cave
18	MF	Yin Hongbo	30 October 1989 (aged 22)		(China) Guangdong Sunray Cave
19	DF	Wang Weilong	24 February 1988 (aged 23)		(China) Nanchang Hengyuan
20	DF	Zhu Cong	8 February 1985 (aged 26)		(China) Guangdong Sunray Cave
23	FW	Lu Lin	3 February 1985 (aged 26)		(China) Guangdong Sunray Cave
25	FW	Tan Binliang	4 November 1989 (aged 22)		(China) Guangdong Sunray Cave
29	FW	Chang Feiya	3 February 1993 (aged 18)		(China) Guangdong Minmetals
30	GK	Yang Zhi	15 January 1983 (aged 28)		(China) Beijing Guoan

=== Hong Kong ===
Manager: Liu Chun Fai

No.	Pos.	Player	Date of birth (age)	Caps	Club
1	GK	Yapp Hung Fai	21 March 1990 (aged 21)	10	(Hong Kong) South China
2	DF	Lee Chi Ho	16 November 1982 (aged 29)	36	(Hong Kong) South China
3	DF	Jack Sealy	4 May 1987 (aged 24)	0	(Hong Kong) Sunray Cave JC Sun Hei
4	MF	Man Pei Tak	26 February 1982 (aged 29)	38	(Hong Kong) South China
5	DF	Ng Wai Chiu	22 October 1981 (aged 30)	19	(Hong Kong) South China
6	DF	Wong Chin Hung	2 March 1982 (aged 29)	13	(Hong Kong) South China
7	FW	Chan Siu Ki	14 July 1985 (aged 26)	39	(Hong Kong) South China
8	FW	Xu Deshuai	13 July 1987 (aged 24)	11	(Hong Kong) South China
9	FW	Cheng Siu Wai	27 December 1981 (aged 30)	12	(Hong Kong) Sunray Cave JC Sun Hei
10	MF	Lam Ka Wai	5 June 1985 (aged 26)	12	(Hong Kong) Kitchee
11	FW	Jaimes McKee	14 April 1987 (aged 24)	0	(Hong Kong) TSW Pegasus
12	DF	Lo Kwan Yee	9 October 1984 (aged 27)	21	(Hong Kong) Kitchee
13	DF	Cheung Kin Fung	1 January 1984 (aged 27)	10	(Hong Kong) TSW Pegasus
14	FW	Kwok Kin Pong	30 March 1987 (aged 24)	15	(Hong Kong) South China
15	DF	Chan Wai Ho	24 April 1982 (aged 29)	47	(Hong Kong) South China
16	MF	Leung Chun Pong	1 October 1986 (aged 25)	28	(Hong Kong) South China
17	FW	Chen Liming	20 April 1987 (aged 24)	0	(Hong Kong) Wofoo Tai Po
18	GK	Tse Tak Him	10 February 1985 (aged 26)	9	(Hong Kong) Citizen
19	FW	Lee Hong Lim	29 September 1983 (aged 28)	12	(Hong Kong) TSW Pegasus
20	FW	Godfred Karikari	11 March 1985 (aged 26)	0	(Hong Kong) TSW Pegasus
21	DF	Lau Nim Yat	4 December 1989 (aged 22)	3	(Hong Kong) TSW Pegasus

== Match details ==
=== First leg ===
28 December 2011
20:00 HKT

Hong Kong	2 – 2	Guangdong
Cheng Siu Wai 63'; Karikari 74'	Report	Tan Binliang 26'; Huang Fengtao 89'

Hong Kong Stadium, So Kon Po
Attendance: 4,165
Referee: Tong Kui Sum (Hong Kong)

Hong Kong	Guangdong

GK	1	Yapp Hung Fai
RB	3	Jack Sealy
CB	2	Lee Chi Ho
CB	5	Ng Wai Chiu (c)
LB	13	Cheung Kin Fung		(substituted off) 83'
DM	16	Leung Chun Pong
RM	12	Lo Kwan Yee
LM	14	Kwok Kin Pong
AM	9	Cheng Siu Wai		(substituted off) 82'
CF	8	Xu Deshuai		(substituted off) 46'
CF	20	Godfred Karikari		(substituted off) 88'
Substitutions:
GK	18	Tse Tak Him
DF	6	Wong Chin Hung		(substituted on) 83'
DF	21	Lau Nim Yat		(substituted on) 82'
MF	4	Man Pei Tak	(yellow card) 90'	(substituted on) 46'
MF	10	Lam Ka Wai
FW	11	Jaimes McKee		(substituted on) 88'
FW	17	Chen Liming
Manager:
Liu Chun Fai

GK	30	Yang Zhi
CB	12	Li Jianhua	(yellow card) 83'	(substituted off) 88'
CB	19	Wang Weilong
CB	5	Yuan Lin
RM	18	Yin Hongbo (c)	(yellow card) 90'
CM	2	Li Yan
CM	9	Wu Weian		(substituted off) 80'
LM	6	Ge Zhen	(yellow card) 45'
RF	25	Tan Binliang		(substituted off) 67'
CF	13	Shi Liang		(substituted off) 75'
LF	23	Lu Lin
Substitutes:
GK	1	Li Weijun
DF	4	Guo Zichao
DF	20	Zhu Cong		(substituted on) 88'
MF	15	Zhao Huang		(substituted on) 80'
FW	7	Wu Pingfeng		(substituted on) 67'
FW	10	Huang Fengtao		(substituted on) 75'
FW	29	Chang Feiya
Manager:
Cao Yang

=== Second leg ===
1 January 2012
15:00 CST

Guangdong	0 – 0 (a.e.t.)	Hong Kong
	Report
Penalties
Yin Hongbo (penalty missed); Li Yan (penalty scored); Zhao Huang (penalty scored); Li Jianhua (penalty missed); Huang Fengtao (penalty scored); Chang Feiya (penalty scored); Ge Zhen (penalty missed)	4 – 5	(penalty scored) Lo Kwan Yee; (penalty missed) Lee Chi Ho; (penalty missed) Leung Chun Pong; (penalty scored) Cheung Kin Fung; (penalty scored) Chan Wai Ho; (penalty scored) Man Pei Tak; (penalty scored) Lam Ka Wai

Huizhou Olympic Stadium, Huizhou, China PR
Attendance: 30,000
Referee: Sun Bing (China PR)

Guangdong	Hong Kong

GK	30	Yang Zhi
CB	12	Li Jianhua
CB	19	Wang Weilong
CB	5	Yuan Lin
RM	18	Yin Hongbo (c)
CM	2	Li Yan
CM	9	Wu Weian	(substituted off) 88'
LM	6	Ge Zhen
RF	7	Wu Pingfeng	(substituted off) 65'
CF	13	Shi Liang	(substituted off) 61'
LF	23	Lu Lin	(substituted off) 91'
Substitutes:
GK	1	Li Weijun
DF	4	Guo Zichao
DF	20	Zhu Cong
MF	15	Zhao Huang	(substituted on) 88'
FW	10	Huang Fengtao	(substituted on) 61'
FW	25	Tan Binliang	(substituted on) 91'
FW	29	Chang Feiya	(substituted on) 65'
Manager:
Cao Yang

GK	1	Yapp Hung Fai
CB	2	Lee Chi Ho	(yellow card) 53'
CB	5	Ng Wai Chiu (c)
CB	15	Chan Wai Ho
DM	16	Leung Chun Pong
RM	3	Jack Sealy	(yellow card) 12'	(substituted off) 111'
CM	11	Jaimes McKee		(substituted off) 106'
CM	9	Cheng Siu Wai		(substituted off) 62'
LM	6	Wong Chin Hung		(substituted off) 97'
CF	20	Godfred Karikari	(yellow card) 120'
CF	14	Kwok Kin Pong		(substituted off) 90'
Substitutions:
GK	18	Tse Tak Him
DF	12	Lo Kwan Yee		(substituted on) 106'
DF	13	Cheung Kin Fung		(substituted on) 90'
MF	4	Man Pei Tak		(substituted on) 97'
MF	10	Lam Ka Wai		(substituted on) 111'
FW	8	Xu Deshuai		(substituted on) 62'
FW	17	Chen Liming
Manager:
Liu Chun Fai
