= 33rd Guangdong–Hong Kong Cup =

33rd Guangdong-Hong Kong Cup
- Event: Guangdong-Hong Kong Cup
Hong Kong	Guangdong
2	4

First leg
Hong Kong	Guangdong
1	3
- Date: 1 January 2011
- Venue: Guangdong People's Stadium, Guangzhou
- Referee: He Zhibiao (China PR)
- Attendance: 8,000

Second leg
Guangdong	Hong Kong
1	1
- Date: 4 January 2011
- Venue: Hong Kong Stadium, Hong Kong
- Referee: Liu Kwok Man (Hong Kong)
- Attendance: 3,175

The 33rd Guangdong-Hong Kong Cup was held in 1 and 4 January 2011. The first leg was played at Guangdong People's Stadium, Guangzhou on 1 January, with the second leg taken place at Hong Kong Stadium, Hong Kong on 4 January.

== Squads ==
=== Guangdong ===
The squad was announced on 30 December 2010.

Manager: (China) Cao Yang

No.	Pos.	Player	Date of birth (age)	Caps	Goals	Club
1	GK	Li Weijun	1 December 1981 (age 44)			(Chinese Football Association) Guangdong Sunray Cave
23	GK	Zhang Xunwei	28 February 1989 (age 37)			(Chinese Football Association) Shenzhen Ruby F.C.
2	DF	Li Zhihai	2 August 1982 (age 43)			(Chinese Football Association) Guangzhou F.C.
3	DF	Liu Sheng	8 September 1989 (age 36)			(Chinese Football Association) Guangdong Sunray Cave
6	DF	Yuan Lin	26 February 1977 (age 49)			(Chinese Football Association) Shenzhen Ruby F.C.
12	DF	Li Jianhua	12 February 1982 (age 44)			(Chinese Football Association) Guangzhou F.C.
19	DF	Wang Chao	19 December 1989 (age 36)			(Chinese Football Association) Guangdong Sunray Cave
20	DF	Zhu Cong	8 February 1985 (age 41)			(Chinese Football Association) Guangdong Sunray Cave
21	DF	Liu Yuchen	3 October 1989 (age 36)			(Chinese Football Association) Guangdong Sunray Cave
10	MF	Pan Jia	1 October 1989 (age 36)			(Chinese Football Association) Guangdong Sunray Cave
14	MF	Tan Binliang	4 November 1989 (age 36)			(Chinese Football Association) Guangdong Sunray Cave
15	MF	Zhao Huang	2 February 1989 (age 37)			(Chinese Football Association) Guangdong Sunray Cave
16	MF	Li Jian	1 March 1989 (age 37)			(Chinese Football Association) Guangdong Sunray Cave
17	MF	Yu Jianfeng	29 January 1989 (age 37)			(Chinese Football Association) Guangdong Sunray Cave
18	MF	Yin Hongbo	30 October 1989 (age 36)			(Chinese Football Association) Guangdong Sunray Cave
26	MF	Li Yan	19 November 1984 (age 41)			(Chinese Football Association) Guangzhou F.C.
11	FW	Cong Tianhao	14 March 1989 (age 37)			(Chinese Football Association) Guangdong Sunray Cave
13	FW	Shi Liang	11 May 1989 (age 36)			(Chinese Football Association) Guangdong Sunray Cave
25	FW	Huang Fengtao	17 June 1985 (age 40)			(Chinese Football Association) Shenzhen Ruby F.C.
28	FW	Ye Weichao	18 February 1989 (age 37)			(Chinese Football Association) Guangdong Sunray Cave

=== Hong Kong ===
The squad was announced on 23 December 2010.

Manager: (Hong Kong) Tsang Wai Chung

#	Name	Date of birth (age)	Club	Caps (Goals)	Debut
Goalkeepers
1	Zhang Chunhui	13 March 1983 (age 43)	(Hong Kong) South China	8 (0)	v India, 14 January 2009
17	Tse Tak Him	10 February 1985 (age 41)	(Hong Kong) Citizen	8 (0)	v Myanmar, 2 December 2004
Defenders
2	Lee Chi Ho	16 November 1982 (age 43)	(Hong Kong) South China	31 (0)	v Singapore, 8 October 2000
3	Poon Yiu Cheuk	19 September 1977 (age 48)	(Hong Kong) South China	62 (4)	v Vietnam, 19 November 1998
4	Deng Jinghuang	24 January 1985 (age 41)	(Hong Kong) TSW Pegasus	3 (0)	v Japan, 9 October 2009
6	Gerard Ambassa Guy	21 September 1978 (age 47)	(Hong Kong) TSW Pegasus	28 (6)	v Denmark, 29 January 2006
12	Lo Kwan Yee	9 October 1984 (age 41)	(Hong Kong) Kitchee	14 (5)	v Chinese Taipei, 19 June 2007
13	Sham Kwok Fai	30 May 1984 (age 41)	(Hong Kong) Citizen	10 (0)	v Denmark, 29 January 2006
15	Chan Wai Ho	24 April 1982 (age 43)	(Hong Kong) Fourway Rangers	40 (3)	v United Arab Emirates, 12 November 2000
Midfielders
5	Bai He	19 November 1983 (age 42)	(Hong Kong) South China	10 (0)	v Chinese Taipei, 23 August 2009
9	Lee Wai Lim	5 May 1981 (age 44)	(Hong Kong) South China	11 (4)	v Macau, 19 November 2008
10	Lam Ka Wai	5 June 1985 (age 40)	(Hong Kong) Kitchee	10 (3)	v Mongolia, 5 March 2005
11	Li Haiqiang	3 May 1977 (age 48)	(Hong Kong) South China	6 (1)	v Macau, 19 November 2008
14	Sham Kwok Keung	5 June 1985 (age 40)	(Hong Kong) Citizen	17 (2)	v South Korea, 4 December 2003
16	Leung Chun Pong	1 October 1986 (age 39)	(Hong Kong) South China	24 (1)	v Singapore, 12 August 2006
18	Kwok Kin Pong	30 March 1987 (age 38)	(Hong Kong) South China	9 (0)	v Chinese Taipei, 23 August 2009
23	Chu Siu Kei	11 January 1980 (age 46)	(Hong Kong) Kitchee	34 (5)	v Vietnam, 19 November 1998
24	Ju Yingzhi	24 July 1987 (age 38)	(Hong Kong) Citizen	3 (1)	v Philippines, 9 October 2010
Strikers
7	Chan Siu Ki	14 July 1985 (age 40)	(Hong Kong) South China	33 (26)	v Singapore, 30 November 2004
20	Ye Jia	1 December 1981 (age 44)	(Hong Kong) NT Realty Wofoo Tai Po	2 (0)	v India, 4 October 2010
25	Cheng Lai Hin	31 March 1986 (age 39)	(Hong Kong) South China	4 (0)	v Bahrain, 6 January 2010

== Match details ==
=== First leg ===
1 January 2011
15:00 CST

Guangdong	3–1	Hong Kong
Li Jianhua 6'; Yuan Lin 10'; Huang Fengtao 70'	Report	Lo Kwan Yee 51'

Guangdong People's Stadium, Guangzhou
Attendance: 8,000
Referee: He Zhibiao (China PR)

Guangdong	Hong Kong

GUANGDONG:
GK	1	Li Weijun
RB	2	Li Zhihai
CB	12	Li Jianhua
CB	6	Yuan Lin (c)
LB	20	Zhu Cong
RM	18	Yin Hongbo		(substituted off) 74'
CM	26	Li Yan
CM	10	Pan Jia
LM	14	Tan Binliang		(substituted off) 57'
CF	13	Shi Liang	(yellow card) 36'
CF	25	Huang Fengtao		(substituted off) 85'
Substitutes:
GK	23	Zhang Xunwei
DF	3	Liu Sheng
DF	19	Wang Chao
DF	21	Liu Yuchen
MF	15	Zhao Huang
MF	16	Li Jian		(substituted on) 74'
FW	11	Cong Tianhao		(substituted on) 85'
FW	28	Ye Weichao		(substituted on) 57'
Manager:
Cao Yang

HONG KONG:
GK	1	Zhang Chunhui
CB	2	Lee Chi Ho	(yellow card) 36'
CB	5	Bai He	(yellow card) 45'
CB	15	Chan Wai Ho
RWB	12	Lo Kwan Yee
LWB	3	Poon Yiu Cheuk
CM	24	Ju Yingzhi		(substituted off) 34'
CM	11	Li Haiqiang (c)		(substituted off) 83'
CM	18	Kwok Kin Pong	(yellow card) 59'
CF	20	Ye Jia		(substituted off) 61'
CF	7	Chan Siu Ki	(yellow card) 45'
Substitutions:
GK	17	Tse Tak Him
DF	4	Deng Jinghuang
DF	6	Gerard Ambassa Guy		(substituted on) 83'
DF	13	Sham Kwok Fai	(yellow card) 63'	(substituted on) 34'
MF	9	Lee Wai Lim
MF	10	Lam Ka Wai
MF	23	Chu Siu Kei
FW	14	Sham Kwok Keung
FW	25	Cheng Lai Hin	(yellow card) 67'	(substituted on) 61'
Manager:
Tsang Wai Chung

=== Second leg ===
4 January 2011
20:00 HKT

Hong Kong	1–1	Guangdong
Sham Kwok Keung 59'	Report	Li Jian 45'

Hong Kong Stadium, Hong Kong
Attendance: 3,175
Referee: Liu Kwok Man (Hong Kong)

Hong Kong	Guangdong

HONG KONG:
GK	17	Tse Tak Him
CB	2	Lee Chi Ho
CB	5	Bai He
CB	15	Chan Wai Ho
RWB	13	Sham Kwok Fai	(yellow card) 18'	(substituted off) 72'
LWB	3	Poon Yiu Cheuk (c)		(substituted off) 67'
CM	12	Lo Kwan Yee	(yellow card) 22'
CM	11	Li Haiqiang
CM	18	Kwok Kin Pong		(substituted off) 81'
SS	14	Sham Kwok Keung
CF	7	Chan Siu Ki		(substituted off) 81'
Substitutions:
GK	1	Zhang Chunhui
DF	4	Deng Jinghuang		(substituted on) 67'
DF	6	Gerard Ambassa Guy		(substituted on) 72'
MF	9	Lee Wai Lim
MF	10	Lam Ka Wai
MF	23	Chu Siu Kei		(substituted on) 81'
MF	24	Ju Yingzhi
FW	20	Ye Jia
FW	25	Cheng Lai Hin		(substituted on) 81'
Manager:
Tsang Wai Chung

GUANGDONG:
GK	1	Li Weijun
RB	2	Li Zhihai
CB	12	Li Jianhua
CB	6	Yuan Lin (c)
LB	20	Zhu Cong
RM	18	Yin Hongbo	(substituted off) 75'
CM	26	Li Yan
CM	10	Pan Jia
LM	16	Li Jian	(substituted off) 65'
CF	13	Shi Liang	(substituted off) 79'
CF	25	Huang Fengtao	(substituted off) 90'
Substitutes:
GK	23	Zhang Xunwei
DF	3	Liu Sheng
DF	21	Liu Yuchen	(substituted on) 90'
MF	14	Tan Binliang	(substituted on) 75'
MF	15	Zhao Huang
FW	11	Cong Tianhao	(substituted on) 79'
FW	28	Ye Weichao	(substituted on) 65'
Manager:
Cao Yang
