= Godfred Karikari =

Hong Kong footballer

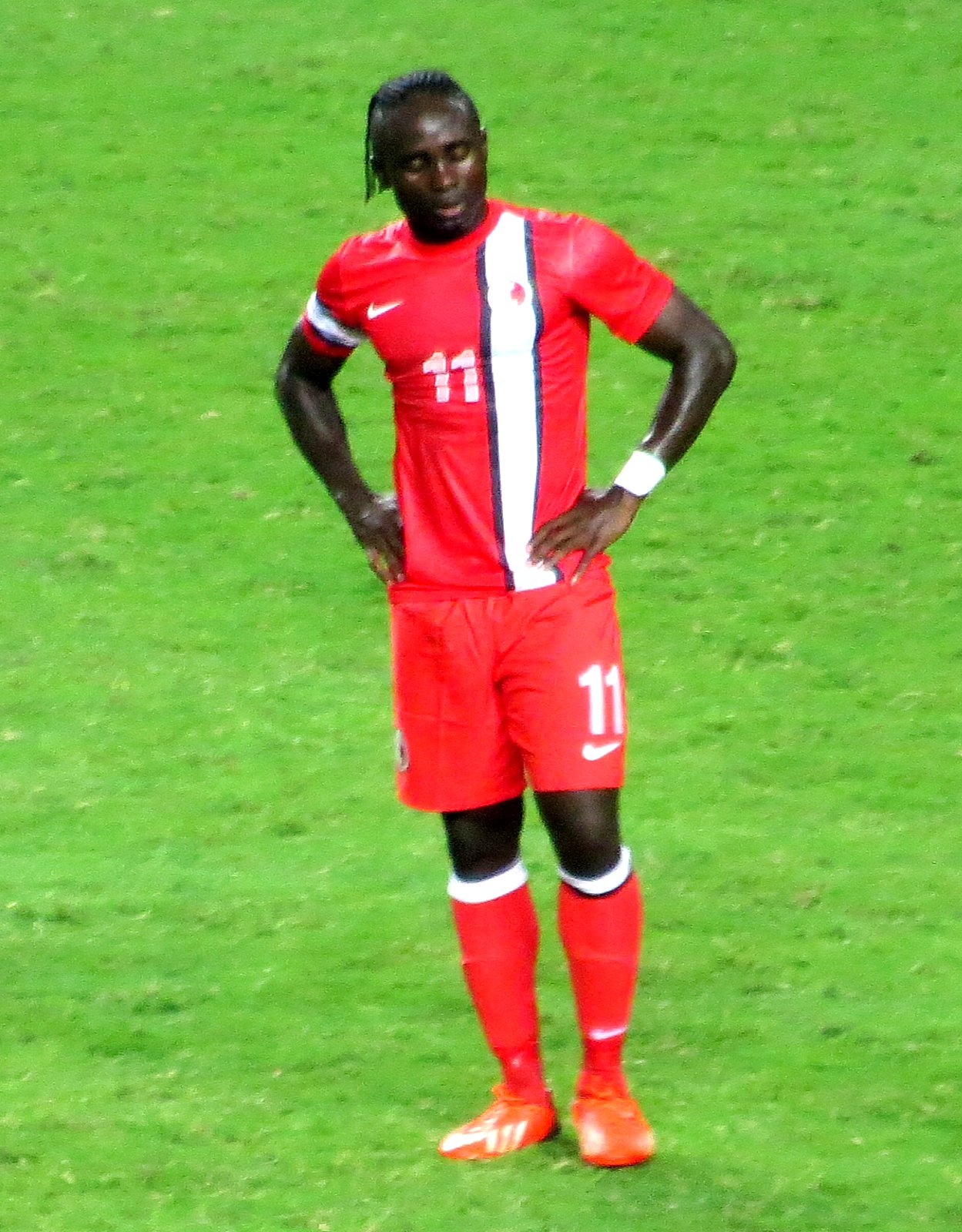
- Karikari playing for Hong Kong in 2013

Personal information
- Full name: Godfred Karikari
- Date of birth: 11 March 1985 (age 41)
- Place of birth: Kumasi, Ghana
- Height: 1.79 m (5 ft 10 in)
- Positions: Forward; winger

Senior career*
| Years | Team | Apps | (Gls) |
| 2003–2005 | Fukien | 15 | (2) |
| 2005–2007 | Rangers (HKG) | 37 | (16) |
| 2008–2010 | Happy Valley | 44 | (14) |
| 2010–2012 | Pegasus | 33 | (20) |
| 2012–2013 | Henan Jianye | 16 | (1) |
| 2014 | Shenzhen Ruby | 5 | (2) |
| 2014–2015 | Beijing Baxy | 35 | (6) |
| 2016–2017 | Qingdao Huanghai | 45 | (5) |
| 2018–2019 | R&F | 8 | (2) |
| 2020 | Kitchee | 0 | (0) |

International career^{‡}
| 2012–2017 | Hong Kong | 24 | (4) |
- * Club domestic league appearances and goals as of 5 September 2020 ‡ National team caps and goals as of 10 October 2017

Godfred Karikari (Chinese: 高梵·卡里卡利; Jyutping: Gou1 Faan4 Kaa1 Lei5 Kaa1 Lei6; born 11 March 1985) is a former professional footballer who played as a forward. Born in Ghana, he represented the Hong Kong national football team.

== Early life ==
Karikari was born to an affluent family in Ghana. He was a fast runner in his youth and was invited to join the school's track and field team; instead, he chose to play football. He was introduced to Hong Kong football by his manager and has not returned to Ghana since. His family members, whom he visits when he is on holiday, live in the United States and the United Kingdom today.

== Club career ==
=== Early career ===
Karikari arrived in Hong Kong in 2002 and joined Fukien. In 2005, he moved to Rangers (HKG).

=== Happy Valley ===
Karikari moved to Happy Valley in January 2008. He scored 9 goals in the remainder of the season. Although the club decided to use a youth strategy for 2009–10 season, his contract was renewed. The club finished last of the 10 clubs in the season and Karikari left the club for TSW Pegasus.

=== Pegasus ===
Karikari joined Pegasus. On 11 September 2010, he scored 3 goals in TSW Pegasus' 5:1 victory over HKFC. On 1 April 2011, he scored another hat-trick against Tai Chung FC in a 7–1 win. In total, he scored 13 goals for TSW Pegasus in all local competitions in the 2010–11 season.

In the 2011–12 season, Karikari continued his good form by scoring 6 goals in 3 games, including a hat-trick against Sham Shui Po on 24 September 2011. He was voted Most Valuable Player of Month in September 2011 by the Hong Kong Sports Press Association.

=== Henan Jianye ===
On 13 June 2012, Karikari moved to mainland China and signed a contract with Chinese Super League side Henan Jianye. He joined as a Hong Kong Chinese player and therefore not occupying any foreigners quotas of the club. He made his debut for Henan on 23 June, in a 0–0 away draw against Dalian Shide. His first goal for Henan came on 4 days later, which ensured Henan beat Chongqing Lifan 2–0 in the third round of 2012 Chinese FA Cup.

=== Shenzhen Ruby ===
In February 2014, Karikari transferred to China League One side Shenzhen Ruby.

=== Beijing Baxy ===
In July 2014, Karikari transferred to another China League One club Beijing Baxy.

=== Qingdao Huanghai ===
On 4 January 2016, Karikari signed by another China League One club Qingdao Huanghai.

=== R&F ===
After six years abroad, Karikari returned to Hong Kong's top flight, and signed with R&F on 19 January 2018.

On 19 June 2019, head coach Yeung Ching Kwong announced that Karikari would not be retained.

=== Kitchee ===
On 5 February 2020, Karikari signed with another HKPL club Kitchee. However, he failed to make any appearances during his spell at the club due to the spreading of Coronavirus which makes the HKPL being suspended from mid of March 2020.

Karikari left the club after his contract expired in July 2020.

== International career ==
Karikari spent more than seven years playing football in Hong Kong. He received his Hong Kong Permanent Identity Card on 7 February 2011. His lack of a Hong Kong SAR passport meant he was unable to be registered as a Hong Kong player in the 2011 AFC Cup and was also unable to represent Hong Kong in international matches. Due to his late application, he didn't receive his passport to represent Hong Kong until November 2011. On 2 December, he was called up by caretaker Hong Kong coach Liu Chun Fai for the 2012 Guangdong-Hong Kong Cup squad. Godfred Karikari scored on his debut for Hong Kong in the 2012 Guangdong-Hong Kong Cup as the match ended 2–2.

On 11 April 2012, Hong Kong head coach Ernie Merrick confirmed that Karikari's association change had been approved and he could represent the Football Association of Hong Kong.

On 1 June 2012, Karikari made his international debut for Hong Kong in a friendly match against Singapore.

Karikari scored his first international goal for Hong Kong against Bhutan on 11 June 2015 in a 2018 FIFA World Cup qualifier.

== Career statistics ==
=== Club ===
Updated 5 February 2020

| Club performance | | | League | | Cup | | League Cup | | Continental | | Total | |
| Season | Club | League | Apps | Goals | Apps | Goals | Apps | Goals | Apps | Goals | Apps | Goals |
| Hong Kong | | | League | | FA Cup & Shield | | League Cup | | Asia | | Total | |
|---|---|---|---|---|---|---|---|---|---|---|---|---|
| 2002–03 | Fukien | Hong Kong First Division | | | | | | | — | | | |
| 2003–04 | Fukien | Hong Kong First Division | | 3 | | 0 | | 0 | — | | | 3 |
| 2004–05 | Fukien | Hong Kong First Division | 13 | 1 | 3 | 0 | 2 | 0 | — | | 18 | 1 |
| 2005–06 | Rangers | Hong Kong First Division | 12 | 4 | 1 | 0 | 3 | 1 | — | | 16 | 5 |
| 2006–07 | Rangers | Hong Kong First Division | 17 | 9 | 2 | 0 | 3 | 2 | — | | 22 | 11 |
| 2007–08 | Rangers | Hong Kong First Division | 8 | 3 | 2 | 1 | 0 | 0 | — | | 10 | 4 |
| 2007–08 | Happy Valley | Hong Kong First Division | 6 | 1 | 1 | 1 | 1 | 1 | — | | 8 | 3 |
| 2008–09 | Happy Valley | Hong Kong First Division | 22 | 9 | 2 | 0 | 1 | 0 | — | | 25 | 9 |
| 2009–10 | Happy Valley | Hong Kong First Division | 16 | 4 | 1 | 0 | — | | — | | 17 | 4 |
| 2010–11 | Pegasus | Hong Kong First Division | 16 | 9 | 3 | 3 | 2 | 1 | 0 | 0 | 21 | 13 |
| 2011–12 | Pegasus | Hong Kong First Division | 17 | 11 | 7 | 1 | 3 | 0 | — | | 27 | 12 |
| China PR | | | League | | FA Cup | | CSL Cup | | Asia | | Total | |
| 2012 | Henan Jianye | Chinese Super League | 9 | 0 | 2 | 1 | — | | — | | 11 | 1 |
| 2013 | Henan Jianye | China League One | 7 | 1 | 0 | 0 | — | | — | | 7 | 1 |
| 2014 | Shenzhen Ruby | China League One | 5 | 1 | 0 | 0 | — | | — | | 5 | 1 |
| 2014 | Beijing Baxy | China League One | 13 | 3 | 0 | 0 | — | | — | | 13 | 3 |
| 2015 | Beijing Baxy | China League One | 22 | 3 | 5 | 1 | — | | — | | 27 | 4 |
| 2016 | Qingdao Huanghai | China League One | 24 | 4 | 0 | 0 | — | | — | | 24 | 4 |
| 2017 | Qingdao Huanghai | China League One | 21 | 1 | 0 | 0 | — | | — | | 21 | 1 |
| Hong Kong | | | League | | FA Cup & Shield | | Sapling Cup | | Asia | | Total | |
| 2017–18 | R&F | Hong Kong Premier League | 6 | 2 | 0 | 0 | 0 | 0 | — | | 6 | 2 |
| 2018–19 | R&F | Hong Kong Premier League | 2 | 0 | 0 | 0 | 2 | 0 | — | | 4 | 0 |
| 2019–20 | Kitchee | Hong Kong Premier League | 0 | 0 | 0 | 0 | 0 | 0 | 0 | 0 | 0 | 0 |
| Total | Hong Kong | | | | | | | | 0 | 0 | | |
| Total | China PR | | 101 | 13 | 7 | 2 | 0 | 0 | 0 | 0 | 108 | 15 |
| Career total | | | | | | | | | 0 | 0 | | |

=== International ===
As of 10 October 2017

| National team | Year | Apps | Goals |
|---|---|---|---|
| Hong Kong | 2012 | 2 | 0 |
| Hong Kong | 2013 | 3 | 0 |
| Hong Kong | 2014 | 1 | 0 |
| Hong Kong | 2015 | 7 | 2 |
| Hong Kong | 2016 | 6 | 1 |
| Hong Kong | 2017 | 4 | 1 |
| Total | | 24 | 4 |

Updated 15 October 2013

| # | Date | Venue | Opponent | Result | Scored | Competition |
|---|---|---|---|---|---|---|
| | 28 December 2011 | Hong Kong Stadium, So Kon Po, Hong Kong | Guangdong | 2–2 | 1 | 2012 Guangdong-Hong Kong Cup |
| | 1 January 2012 | Huizhou Olympic Stadium, Huizhou, China | Guangdong | 0–0 (5–4 PSO) | 0 | 2012 Guangdong-Hong Kong Cup |
| 1 | 1 June 2012 | Hong Kong Stadium, So Kon Po, Hong Kong | Singapore | 1–0 | 0 | Friendly |
| 2 | 10 June 2012 | Mong Kok Stadium, Mong Kok, Hong Kong | Vietnam | 1–2 | 0 | Friendly |
| | 6 September 2013 | Thuwunna Stadium, Yangon, Myanmar | Myanmar | 0–0 | 0 | Friendly |
| 3 | 10 September 2013 | Mong Kok Stadium, Mong Kok, Hong Kong | Singapore | 1–0 | 0 | Friendly |
| 4 | 15 October 2013 | Hong Kong Stadium, Mong Kok, Hong Kong | United Arab Emirates | 0–4 | 0 | Friendly |
| 5 | 15 November 2013 | Mohammed Bin Zayed Stadium, Abu Dhabi, United Arab Emirates | United Arab Emirates | 0–4 | 0 | 2015 AFC Asian Cup qualification |

=== International goals ===
Updated 5 October 2017

| Goal | Date | Venue | Opponent | Score | Result | Competition |
|---|---|---|---|---|---|---|
| 1 | 11 June 2015 | Mong Kok Stadium, Hong Kong | Bhutan | 7–0 | 7–0 | 2018 FIFA World Cup qualification |
| 2 | 8 September 2015 | Mong Kok Stadium, Hong Kong | Qatar | 2–3 | 2–3 | 2018 FIFA World Cup qualification |
| 3 | 6 October 2016 | Olympic Stadium, Cambodia | Cambodia | 1–0 | 2–0 | Friendly |
| 4 | 5 October 2017 | Mong Kok Stadium, Hong Kong | Laos | 3–0 | 4–0 | Friendly |

== Honours ==
=== Club ===
Henan Jianye

- China League One: 2013

=== International ===
Hong Kong

- Guangdong-Hong Kong Cup: 2012
