= Ng Wai Chiu =

Hong Kong footballer (born 1981)

Ng Wai Chiu 吳偉超
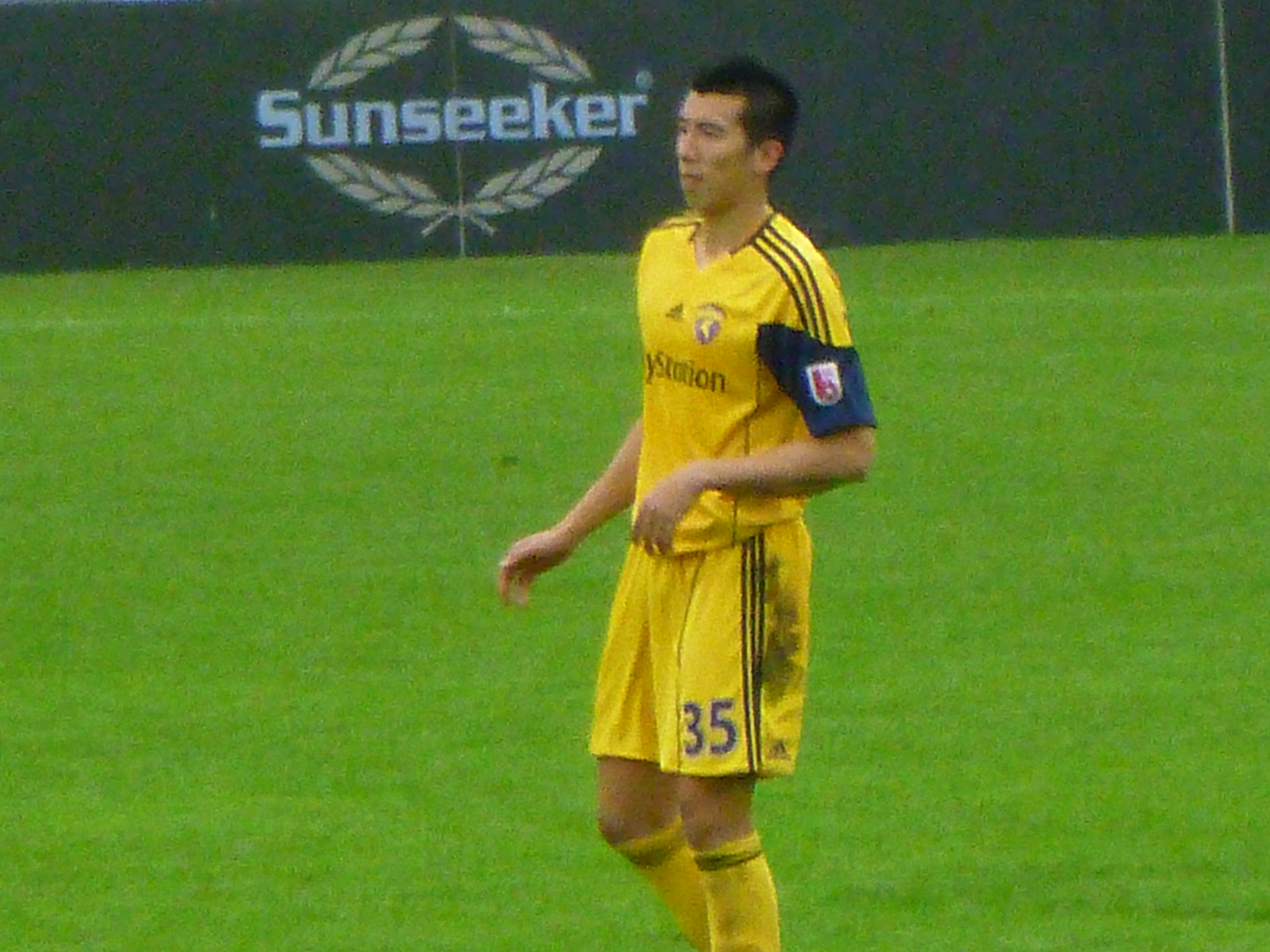
- Ng in 2012

Personal information
- Date of birth: 22 October 1981 (age 45)
- Place of birth: Hong Kong
- Height: 1.85 m (6 ft 1 in)
- Positions: Centre-back; defensive midfielder

Team information
- Current team: Eastern District (head coach)

Youth career
- 1996: Shatin
- 1996–1997: HKSI
- 1997–1998: Instant-Dict
- 1998: Huddersfield Town

Senior career*
Years	Team	Apps	(Gls)
1998–2001	Instant-Dict		
1998–1999	→ Kitchee (loan)		
2001	Guangdong Mingfeng		
2002–2003	Guangzhou Xiangxue	35	(1)
2002	→ South China (loan)	4	(0)
2004–2005	Nanjing Yoyo	27	(2)
2005	→ Shanghai Zobon (loan)	23	(1)
2006–2008	Shanghai Shenhua	39	(1)
2009–2010	Hangzhou Greentown	34	(0)
2011–2012	South China	6	(2)
2012	→ Pegasus (loan)	6	(2)
2012	Pegasus	9	(1)
2013–2016	Tianjin Quanjian	67	(4)
2017–2018	Eastern	10	(1)

International career
2001–2011	Hong Kong	19	(2)

Managerial career
- 2021: Nantong Zhiyun (assistant coach)
- 2022–2023: Dalian Pro (assistant coach)
- 2024–2025: Changchun Yatai (assistant coach)
- 2025–: Eastern District
- * Club domestic league appearances and goals

Ng Wai Chiu
- Traditional Chinese: 吳偉超
Transcriptions
Yue: Cantonese
- Jyutping: Ng4 Wai5ciu1
- Hong Kong Romanisation: Ng Wai Chiu (Note: 超 could also be Tsiu.)
- IPA: [ŋ̬̍ wɐ̬i tsʰíːu]

Ng Wai Chiu (Chinese: 吳偉超; born 22 October 1981) is a Hong Kong football coach and former professional player. He was capped for Hong Kong at various youth levels, as well as the senior national team. He is the current head coach of Hong Kong Premier League club Eastern District.

== Early life ==
Ng's father Ng Chi Ying was also a footballer for Guangdong throughout the 1970s. At the age of 7, Ng moved from Kowloon Bay to Shatin's Hin Keng Estate. He then started playing football in the football field below his building. He began to challenge his father's football skills when he was 15, but lost every time. He joined the Hong Kong Sports Institute in the same year and met his Hong Kong defence partner Chan Wai Ho there for the first time.

== Club career ==
=== Early career ===
Ng spent time learning his trade at various clubs, including a short spell in England when he was an apprentice with Huddersfield Town and Southampton side.

Unsatisfied with the quality of the Hong Kong League, Ng moved to mainland China to further develop his football career. After gradually working his way up from the lower-divisions in mainland China, he signed for Chinese Jia League club Nanjing Yoyo on 15 February 2004, before moving to Chinese Super League club Shanghai Zobon in 2005.

=== Shanghai Zobon ===
In 2005, Ng was a regular starter for the newly promoted club Shanghai Zobon under coach Ma Liangxing. He played 23 matches for Zobon and scored 1 goal, and became the first professional player from Hong Kong to play in the Chinese Super League. The club finished 11th in the 14-team league. He was named as a member of the Shanghai United team to face La Liga outfits Villarreal CF and Sevilla.

=== Shanghai Shenhua ===
In 2006, Ng joined Shanghai Shenhua. At the end of the 2006 Chinese Super League season, Ng was selected as a member of the CSL All Stars. With Ng and Li Weifeng in central defence, Shenhua only conceded 18 goals, which was the second-best record in the league. On 21 December 2006, the club and the player announced an extension to his contract.

=== Hangzhou Greentown ===
In 2009, Ng joined another Chinese Super League club Hangzhou Greentown.

In the 2010–11 season, Ng was plagued by injuries to his knee and missed many matches with the club as well as the Hong Kong national football team.

=== South China ===
Ng returned to Hong Kong and joined South China on 22 January 2011. However, his knee injury persisted and he did not play until April. On 16 April 2011, he played 13 minutes as a substitute as South China beat Rangers 3–1.

On 3 May 2011 in the 2011 AFC Cup, Ng came on as a substitute in the away game against Persipura Jayapura and scored a header with 4 minutes remaining. However, it was to no avail as South China lost 4–2 and was eliminated from the tournament.

=== Pegasus ===
Ng joined Pegasus in January 2012 to get more playing opportunities. He made his debut on 4 February 2012 at home against Sham Shui Po and scored a goal to help his new club seal a 3–0 victory.

=== Tianjin Songjiang ===
On 25 December 2012, Ng returned to mainland China and joined Tianjin Songjiang for an undisclosed fee. He was the captain of Tianjin Songjiang in the 2012–13 season.

=== Eastern ===
On 10 December 2016, Ng returned to Hong Kong again and joined Eastern. He spent his final two seasons at the club.

On 19 June 2018, he announced his retirement from professional football in order to transition to coaching.

== International career ==
Ng played for Hong Kong against Japan in the 2011 AFC Asian Cup qualification match in Hong Kong, but Hong Kong lost 0–4.

Ng also played in the 2010 East Asian Football Championship where Hong Kong lost all 3 of its matches and finished last.

Ng was optimistic that he would be able to play for Hong Kong in the 2014 FIFA World Cup Asian qualification matches. However, in the end he missed the 2014 FIFA World Cup Asian qualification matches against Saudi Arabia due to his poor form.

On 30 September 2011, Ng was sent off in the 3–3 draw with the Philippines in the 2011 Long Teng Cup.

On 1 January 2012, Ng captained Hong Kong to victory over Guangdong in the 2012 Guangdong-Hong Kong Cup when Hong Kong won the cup on penalties.

On 18 September 2012, Ng decided to retire from international football.

== Managerial career ==
On 10 July 2025, Ng was appointed as the head coach of Eastern District.

== Personal life ==
Ng's uncle is Hong Kong actor Francis Ng. Francis Ng wrote the foreword for Ng's autobiography Winning Over Myself (贏自己). He also has a sister, two years younger.

Ng has been married since 2008. He first met his wife, Zhang Huiting, in 2005 when he played for Shanghai Zobon, and later registered his marriage in Hong Kong. However, he has enjoyed affairs with other women during his marriage, including most recently with a married woman.

== Career statistics ==
As of 4 October 2011

Appearances and goals by national team and year
National team	Year	Apps	Goals
Hong Kong	2001	1	0
Hong Kong	2002	0	0
Hong Kong	2003	1	0
Hong Kong	2004	5	1
Hong Kong	2005	1	0
Hong Kong	2006	3	0
Hong Kong	2007	1	0
Hong Kong	2008	0	0
Hong Kong	2009	3	1
Hong Kong	2010	2	0
Hong Kong	2011	2	0
Total		19	2

#	Date	Venue	Opponent	Result	Record	Competition
1	14 January 2001	Fatorda Stadium, Goa, India	Romania	2–4	0	Sahara Millennium Cup
2	4 December 2003	National Stadium, Tokyo, Japan	South Korea	1–3	0	2003 EAFF Championship
3	18 February 2004	Darulmakmur Stadium, Penang, Malaysia	Malaysia	3–1	Goal	2006 FIFA World Cup qualification
4	31 March 2004	Siu Sai Wan Sports Ground, Hong Kong	China	0–1	0	2006 FIFA World Cup qualification
5	9 June 2004	Kazma SC Stadium, Kuwait City, Kuwait	Kuwait	0–4	0	2006 FIFA World Cup qualification
6	13 October 2004	Mong Kok Stadium, Hong Kong	Malaysia	2–0	0	2006 FIFA World Cup qualification
7	17 November 2004	Tianhe Stadium, Guangzhou, China	China	0–7	0	2006 FIFA World Cup qualification
8	9 February 2005	Hong Kong Stadium, Hong Kong	Brazil	1–7	0	2005 Carlsberg Cup
9	18 February 2006	Hong Kong Stadium, Hong Kong	India	2–2	0	Friendly
10	22 February 2006	Hong Kong Stadium, Hong Kong	Qatar	0–3	0	2007 AFC Asian Cup qualification
11	1 March 2006	Bangabandhu National Stadium, Dhaka, Bangladesh	Bangladesh	1–0	0	2007 AFC Asian Cup qualification
12	18 November 2007	Macau UST Stadium, Macau	Macau	9–1	0	Friendly
	1 January 2009	Yuexiushan Stadium, Guangzhou, China	(China) Guangdong	1–3	0	2009 Guangdong–Hong Kong Cup
	4 January 2009	Mong Kok Stadium, Hong Kong	(China) Guangdong	4–1	Goal	2009 Guangdong–Hong Kong Cup
13	14 January 2009	Hong Kong Stadium, Hong Kong	India	2–1	Goal	Friendly
14	21 January 2009	Hong Kong Stadium, Hong Kong	Bahrain	1–3	0	2011 AFC Asian Cup qualification
15	18 November 2009	Hong Kong Stadium, Hong Kong	Japan	0–4	0	2011 AFC Asian Cup qualification
16	7 February 2010	Olympic Stadium, Tokyo, Japan	South Korea	0–5	0	2010 East Asian Football Championship
17	11 February 2010	Olympic Stadium, Tokyo, Japan	Japan	0–3	0	2010 East Asian Football Championship
18	30 September 2011	Kaohsiung National Stadium, Kaohsiung, Taiwan	Philippines	3–3	0	2011 Long Teng Cup
19	4 October 2011	Kaohsiung National Stadium, Kaohsiung, Taiwan	Chinese Taipei	6–0	0	2011 Long Teng Cup
	29 December 2011	Hong Kong Stadium, Hong Kong	(China) Guangdong	2–2	(c)	2012 Guangdong-Hong Kong Cup
	1 January 2012	Huizhou Olympic Stadium, Huizhou, Guangdong, China	(China) Guangdong	0 (4) –0 (5)	(c)	2012 Guangdong-Hong Kong Cup

== Honours ==
Tianjin Quanjian

- China League One: 2016
