= Yang Zhi (footballer) =

Chinese footballer

Yang Zhi 杨智
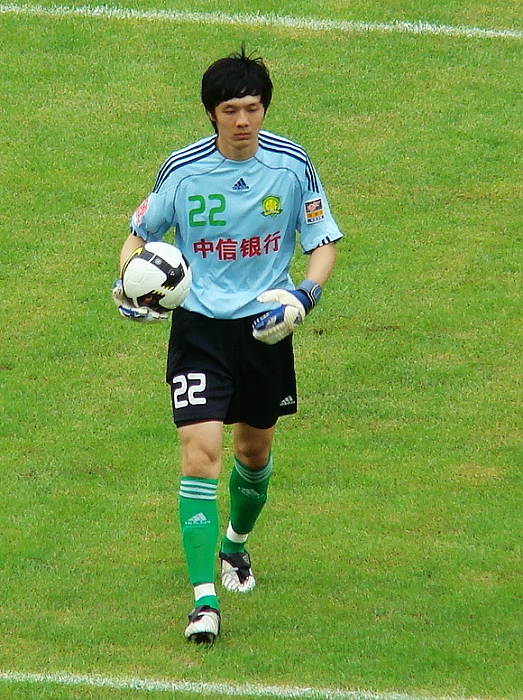

Personal information
- Full name: Yang Zhi
- Date of birth: 15 January 1983 (age 43)
- Place of birth: Guangzhou, Guangdong, China
- Height: 1.86 m (6 ft 1 in)
- Position: Goalkeeper

Team information
- Current team: China (goalkeeping coach)

Youth career
- 2001–2002: Guangdong Youth

Senior career*
Years	Team	Apps	(Gls)
2002–2004	Guangdong Xiongying	48	(0)
2005–2019	Beijing Guoan	350	(0)
Total		398	(0)

International career
2006–2016	China	38	(0)

Managerial career
- 2023: China U19 (goalkeeping)
- 2024–2025: Qingdao West Coast (goalkeeping)
- 2026–: China (goalkeeping)
Medal record
Representing China
Men's football
EAFF Championship
Gold medal – first place	2010 Japan	Team
Silver medal – second place	2013 South Korea	Team
East Asian Games
Gold medal – first place	2001 Macau	Football
- * Club domestic league appearances and goals

Yang Zhi
- Traditional Chinese: 楊智
- Simplified Chinese: 杨智
Transcriptions
Standard Mandarin
- Hanyu Pinyin: Yáng Zhì
- IPA: [jǎŋ.ʈʂɻ̩̂]
Yue: Cantonese
- Jyutping: Joeng4 Zi3
- IPA: [jœŋ˩.tsi˧]

Yang Zhi (born 15 January 1983) is a Chinese retired footballer who is the goalkeeper coach of China national football team. who played for Beijing Guoan in the Chinese Super League from 2005 to the end of the 2019 season.

He retired on 3 August 2020.

== Club career ==
Yang Zhi started his football career at second-tier side Guangdong Xiongying after graduating from their youth academy. He quickly established himself within the squad in the 2002 season with Guangdong, playing in 26 league games. The following season he would play in a further 22 league games for Guangdong and help take them to a tenth-place finish.

Yang's performances caught the eye of Chinese Super League side Beijing Guoan and he soon transferred to the club at the start of the 2005 season where he once again quickly established himself as the first-choice goalkeeper, playing in 21 league games in his debut season. The following seasons saw him become an integral member of the squad; and by the 2009 league season, he had aided them to win the top tier title. Right before the start of the 2012 season, Yang sustained an injury when he played for his home province of Guangdong in the 2012 Guangdong-Hong Kong Cup and was out for most of the season. He recovered in time to return and regain his starting role as goalkeeper for Beijing during the 2013 season.

== International career ==
Yang made his debut in the China national team on 10 August 2006 in a 4–0 win against Thailand, coming on as a substitute for Li Leilei. He would later make his competitive debut the following year on 28 October 2007 in a 1–0 win against Myanmar during 2010 FIFA World Cup qualification. However, it was not until the introduction of then manager Gao Hongbo that saw Yang promoted to first-choice goalkeeper when he named him in his first game on 29 May 2009 in a 1–1 draw against Germany.

== Career statistics ==
=== Club statistics ===
Club performance			League		Cup		League Cup		Continental		Total	
Season	Club	League	Apps	Goals	Apps	Goals	Apps	Goals	Apps	Goals	Apps	Goals
China PR			League		FA Cup		CSL Cup		Asia		Total	
2003	Guangdong Xiongying	Chinese Jia-B League	26	0	3	0	-		-		29	0
2004	Guangdong Xiongying	China League One	22	0	1	0	0	0	-		24	0
2005	Beijing Guoan	Chinese Super League	21	0	6	0	4	0	-		31	0
2006	Beijing Guoan	Chinese Super League	24	0	0	0	-		-		24	0
2007	Beijing Guoan	Chinese Super League	28	0	-		-		-		28	0
2008	Beijing Guoan	Chinese Super League	30	0	-		-		6	0	36	0
2009	Beijing Guoan	Chinese Super League	30	0	-		-		5	0	35	0
2010	Beijing Guoan	Chinese Super League	29	0	-		-		6	0	35	0
2011	Beijing Guoan	Chinese Super League	30	0	4	0	-		-		30	0
2012	Beijing Guoan	Chinese Super League	12	0	1	0	-		-		13	0
2013	Beijing Guoan	Chinese Super League	28	0	4	0	-		8	0	40	0
2014	Beijing Guoan	Chinese Super League	30	0	3	0	-		6	0	39	0
2015	Beijing Guoan	Chinese Super League	30	0	2	0	-		7	0	39	0
2016	Beijing Guoan	Chinese Super League	30	0	4	0	-		-		34	0
2017	Beijing Guoan	Chinese Super League	28	0	2	0	-		-		30	0
2018	Beijing Guoan	Chinese Super League	0	0	0	0	-		-		0	0
2019	Beijing Guoan	Chinese Super League	0	0	0	0	-		-		0	0
Total	China PR		398	0	30	0	4	0	38	0	470	0

=== International statistics ===
National team
Year	Apps	Goals
2006	1	0
2007	1	0
2008	0	0
2009	8	0
2010	11	0
2011	13	0
2012	0	0
2013	2	0
2014	1	0
2015	0	0
2016	1	0
Total	38	0

== Honours ==
=== Club ===
Beijing Guoan

- Chinese Super League: 2009
- Chinese FA Cup: 2018

=== International ===
- East Asian Football Championship: 2010

=== Individual ===
- Chinese Super League Team of the Year: 2007, 2008, 2009
