= Cheng Siu Wai =

Hong Kong footballer (born 1981)

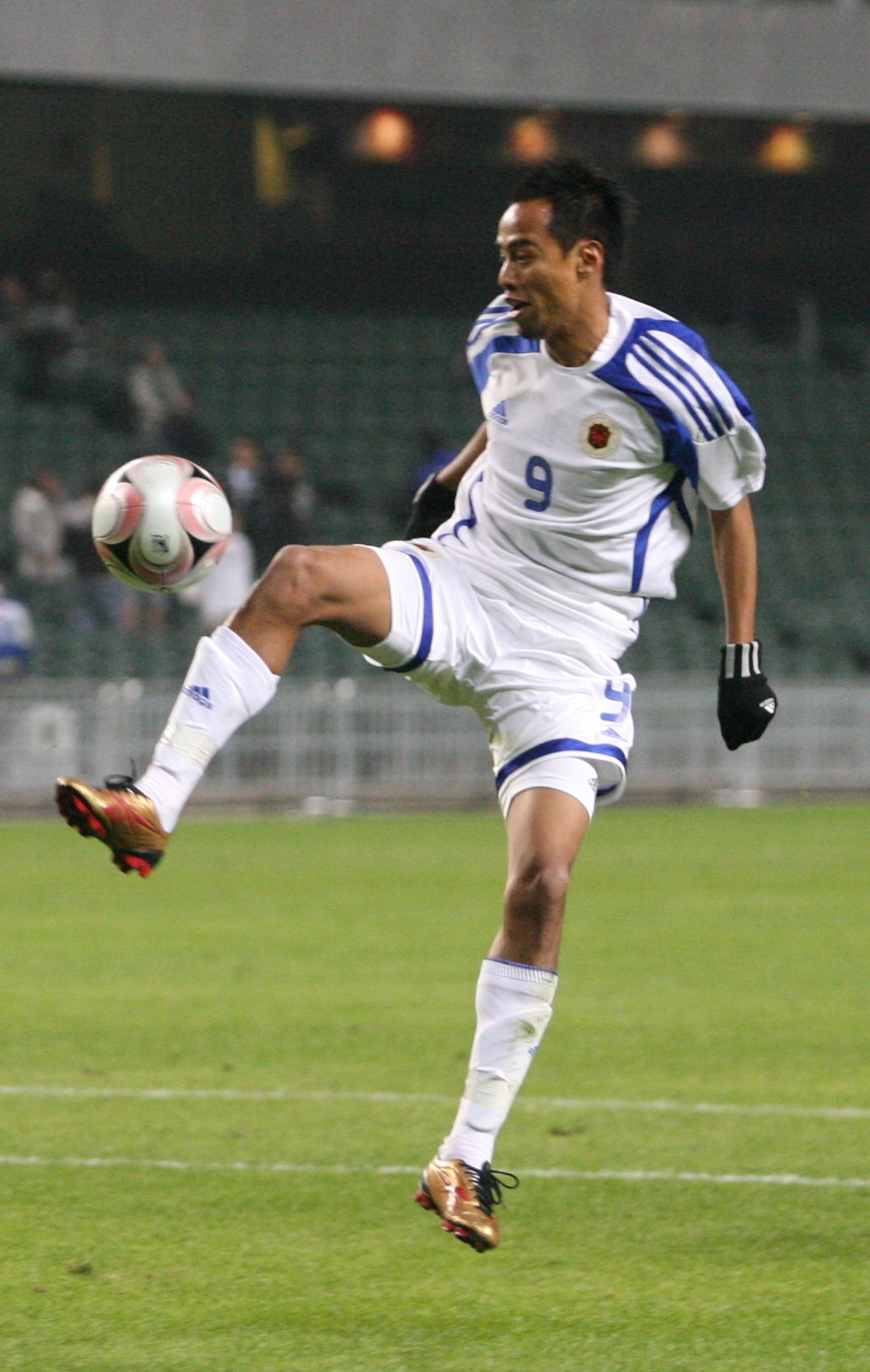

Personal information
- Full name: Henry Cheng Siu Wai
- Date of birth: 27 December 1981 (age 44)
- Place of birth: Yuen Long, British Hong Kong
- Height: 1.80 m (5 ft 11 in)
- Position: Striker

Senior career*
Years	Team	Apps	(Gls)
2002–2003	Double Flower	9	(5)
2003–2004	Rangers (HKG)	16	(1)
2004–2009	South China	61	(8)
2008–2009	→ HK Pegasus (loan)	19	(3)
2009–2011	Kitchee	33	(3)
2011–2012	Sun Hei	17	(6)
2012–2013	Kitchee	11	(2)
2013–2017	Eastern	26	(6)

International career^{‡}
2007–2012	Hong Kong	15	(7)
- * Club domestic league appearances and goals as of 18 June 2013 ‡ National team caps and goals as of 27 May 2017

Henry Cheng Siu Wai (Chinese: 鄭少偉; Cantonese Yale: Jehng Siuwáih, born 27 December 1981) is a former Hong Kong professional footballer who played as a striker.

== Early life ==
Cheng Siu Wai is born to a Hong Kongese father and a Thai mother. They separated when he was a young boy, his mother returned to Thailand and he grew up in a single parent family in a housing estate in Sheung Shui. There was a 5-a-side football field at the estate and he started playing there since primary school.

He finished his studies after reaching Form 3. He was working as an electrician and playing amateur football in Yuen Long, when he was asked if he wanted to play football as a professional. He is popularly known as Henry because of his uncanny physical resemblance to the French striker.

== Club career ==
=== Double Flower ===
Cheng Siu Wai made his Hong Kong First Division League debut in 2002 with Double Flower. He scored his first goal on the same day with a volley at Mong Kok Stadium.

=== Rangers ===
Cheng Siu Wai was released by Buler Rangers one month before the end of the 2004–05 Hong Kong First Division League season because he failed to reach the club's expectations.

=== South China AA ===
When Cheng Siu Wai first joined South China, his monthly salary was only HK$4,000 (approx US$500). By the time he left in 2008, it went up to HK$11,000 (approx US$1,375). Because of his difficult financial situation, he lived in the club's quarters and only returned home once a week.

He was a member of the squad that got South China relegated at the end of the 2005–06 Hong Kong First Division League season. But the club was retained in the first division upon Steven Lo's appointment as the club's convener.

On 11 March 2008, Cheng Siu-wai scored two goals for South China against Home United FC of Singapore, at Mongkok Stadium in an AFC Cup group game. However, South China lost in the end by 2–3.

Cheng Siu Wai was made captain of the South China invitation XI to face Manchester City FC in the Premier League/Serie A Football Day.

=== TSW Pegasus ===
Cheng Siu Wai moved to TSW Pegasus FC when the club was formed at the end of 2008. He was named the club's captain. Cheng claimed he moved to get more playing time. Cheng scored against South China AA in the 2008–09 Hong Kong Senior Challenge Shield Cheng claimed beating South China was one of the teams' targets and he was very happy with the goal and victory. The club went on to win the tournament by beating Sun Hei SC 3:0 in the final. But after just one season at the club, he was loaned to Kitchee.

=== Kitchee ===
On 9 May 2010, Cheng Siu Wai scored two goals and helped Kitchee beat Happy Valley 6:0. On 31 May 2010, Cheng Siu-wai scored the equaliser for Kitchee against Beijing Guoan Talents in the 2010 Singapore Cup, forcing extra time which Kitchee won 2:1 in the end.

In the league, on 21 February 2011, Cheng Siu Wai scored in the 87th minute to help Kitchee beat Tai Po FC 2:1 to stay ahead of South China. Kitchee eventually beat South China to win the 2010–11 league title.

=== Sun Hei ===
Cheng Siu Wai signed to play for Sun Hei SC on 27 June 2011. Cheng said he has won numerous trophies in the past but never any individual awards. In the new season he hopes to win an individual award. He scored his first goal for Sun Hei on 17 September 2011 in a 2:1 win away to Tuen Mun SA. On 16 October 2011, Cheng Siu Wai became the first player to score a goal at the newly renovated Mong Kok Stadium, in a 5–0 win against Sham Shui Po SA. On 22 October, Cheng Siu Wai scored the winning goal against Biu Chun Rangers, just 1 minute from the end, to secure a 1–0 win. On 27 November, Cheng Siu Wai scored a goal against Tai Po FC in the 2011–12 Hong Kong Senior Challenge Shield quarter-final second leg match and was named Player of the month for October.

=== Kitchee SC ===
Kitchee general manager Ken Ng announced that Cheng Siu Wai will return to Kitchee after spending a season in Sunray Cave JC Sun Hei.

=== Eastern ===
Cheng joined Eastern in 2013 and made 26 appearances for the club. He retired from football in 2017 with his final match coming in Eastern's 3–0 win over Southern in the 2016-17 season playoff.

== International career ==
He has been capped 11 times at international level for Hong Kong, and he has scored 7 goals. One of them a diving header against Bahrain in the 2011 AFC Asian Cup qualifier. It was the only goal Hong Kong managed in six qualification matches. In December 2011, Cheng Siu Wai was recalled to the Hong Kong team after consistent good performances for Sun Hei SC, to play in the 2012 Guangdong-Hong Kong Cup. He scored with a header from a Jack Sealy pass in the first leg and the match ended 2–2.

== Personal life ==
Cheng Siu Wai grew up in a single parent family in Sheung Shui. He is the eldest son. He has a longtime girlfriend but does not plan to get married until he reaches 35 years old.

Despite his resemblance to Thierry Henry, his favourite player is David Beckham, after meeting him in an exhibition match between South China AA and Los Angeles Galaxy in 2008.

== Honours ==
South China

- Hong Kong First Division League: 2006–07, 2007–08, 2008–09
- Hong Kong Senior Challenge Shield: 2006–07
- Hong Kong FA Cup: 2006–07
- Hong Kong League Cup: 2007–08

TSW Pegasus

- Hong Kong Senior Challenge Shield: 2008–09

Kitchee

- Hong Kong First Division League: 2009–10, 2010–11
- Hong Kong FA Cup: 2012–13
- Hong Kong Community Cup: 2009
- Hong Kong season play-offs: 2012–13
- HKFC Soccer Sevens: 2011

Sun Cave JC Sun Hei

- Hong Kong Senior Challenge Shield: 2011–12

Eastern Long Lions

- Hong Kong Premier League: 2015–16
- Hong Kong FA Cup: 2013–14
- Hong Kong Senior Challenge Shield: 2014–15，2015–16
- Hong Kong Community Cup: 2016

Hong Kong

- Hong Kong-Guangdong Cup: 2009, 2012, 2013
- Hong Kong–Macau Interport: 2007

== Career statistics ==
=== International career ===
Updated 7 December 2012.

#	Date	Venue	Opponent	Result	Scored	Competition
1	1 June 2007	Gelora Bung Karno Stadium, Jakarta, Indonesia	Indonesia	0–3	0	Friendly
2	10 June 2007	So Kon Po Recreation Ground, Hong Kong	Macau	2–1	0	Hong Kong-Macau Interport
3	21 June 2007	Estádio Campo Desportivo, Macau	Guam	15–1	1	2008 EAFF Championship Preliminary
4	21 October 2007	Gianyar Stadium, Gianyar, Indonesia	Timor-Leste	3–2	2	2010 FIFA World Cup qualification
5	28 October 2007	Hong Kong Stadium, Hong Kong	Timor-Leste	8–1	2	2010 FIFA World Cup qualification
6	10 November 2007	Hong Kong Stadium, Hong Kong	Turkmenistan	0–0	0	2010 FIFA World Cup qualification
7	18 November 2007	Olympic Stadium, Ashgabat, Turkmenistan	Turkmenistan	0–3	0	2010 FIFA World Cup qualification
8	19 November 2008	Macau UST Stadium, Macau	Macau	9–1	1	Friendly
9	14 January 2009	Hong Kong Stadium, Hong Kong	India	2–1	0	Friendly
10	21 January 2009	Hong Kong Stadium, Hong Kong	Bahrain	1–3	1	2011 AFC Asian Cup qualification
11	28 January 2009	Ali Muhesen Stadium, Sanaa, Yemen	Yemen	0–1	0	2011 AFC Asian Cup qualification
12	6 January 2010	National Stadium, Madinat 'Isa, Bahrain	Bahrain	0–4	0	2011 AFC Asian Cup qualification
13	14 November 2012	Shah Alam Stadium, Shah Alam, Malaysia	Malaysia	1–1	0	Friendly
14	1 December 2012	Mong Kok Stadium, Mong Kok, Hong Kong	Guam	2–1	0	2013 EAFF East Asian Cup preliminary round 2
15	7 December 2012	Hong Kong Stadium, So Kon Po, Hong Kong	Chinese Taipei	2–0	0	2013 EAFF East Asian Cup preliminary round 2
