= Jack Sealy =

English-born Hong Kong footballer (born 1987)

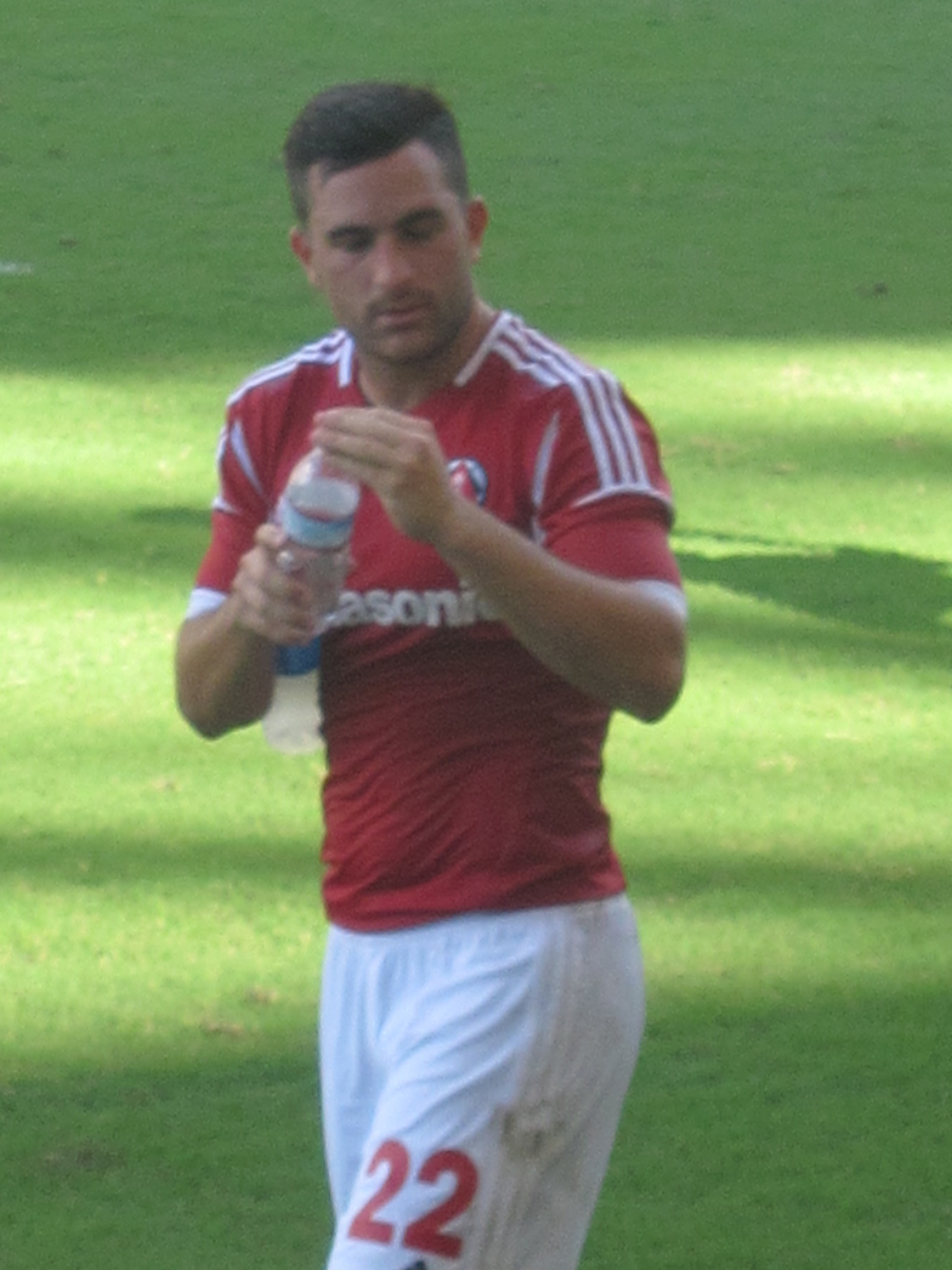
- Sealy playing for South China against Yokohama FC Hong Kong on 2 September 2012

Personal information
- Full name: Jonathan Jack Sealy
- Date of birth: 4 May 1987 (age 39)
- Place of birth: Southampton, England
- Height: 1.73 m (5 ft 8 in)
- Position: Right back

Youth career
- 1999–2005: HKFC

Senior career*
Years	Team	Apps	(Gls)
2005–2011	HKFC	32	(2)
2011–2012	Sun Hei	15	(0)
2012–2015	South China	41	(1)
2016–2017	Changchun Yatai	9	(0)
2018	Tai Po	8	(0)
2018–2019	Pegasus	17	(0)
2019–2022	Southern	29	(0)
2022–2025	HKFC	48	(0)

International career
2013–2017	Hong Kong	23	(0)
- * Club domestic league appearances and goals as of 25 May 2025

Jonathan Jack Sealy (born 4 May 1987) is a former professional footballer who played as a right back. Born in England, he played for the Hong Kong national team.

== Early years ==
Sealy is the son of former Queen's Park Rangers and Eastern player Tony Sealy. Jack is of Barbadian descent through his paternal grandfather. He was born in England and but later became a naturalised Hong Konger. From an early age he represented the Hong Kong Football Club and by the age of 12 was playing football in adult social leagues, the Yau Yee League, before making the step up to the Hong Kong Second Division at the age of 16.

== Club career ==
=== HKFC ===
Sealy played for HKFC from 1999 (promoted to the first team in 2005), with his father Tony Sealy as his coach. He scored an own goal in the 0–6 loss to Kitchee on 23 September 2010. He missed a scoring chance and then scored an own goal in the 2–4 defeat to Fourway Rangers on 17 December 2010.

=== Sun Hei ===
Sealy signed for Sun Hei in June 2011. He made his debut for Sun Hei on 3 September 2011 in the league match against Kitchee.

=== South China ===
Sealy moved to South China in July 2012 to further his career. On 29 September 2012, Dhiego Martins scored in stoppage time from an inch-perfect cross from Sealy, helping the club beat rivals Kitchee 1–0. Sealy scored his first league goal for South China against Yokohama FC Hong Kong on 15 February 2014.

=== Changchun Yatai ===
On 27 December 2015, South China announced that Sealy had signed with Chinese Super League club Changchun Yatai on a five-year contract. He left for his new club in January 2016.

=== Tai Po ===
On 19 January 2018, Tai Po announced that Sealy had signed with the club, returning to Hong Kong after two years abroad.

=== Pegasus ===
On 22 July 2018, it was reported that Sealy had left Tai Po for fellow Hong Kong Premier League club Pegasus.

=== Southern ===
On 2 July 2019, Sealy moved back to the island, signing a contract with Southern.

On 17 July 2022, Sealy left the club.

=== HKFC ===
On 7 August 2022, it was reported that Sealy would return to HKFC after 11 years.

== International career ==
On 6 December 2011, Sealy trained with the Hong Kong national football team for the first time, to prepare for the 2012 Guangdong-Hong Kong Cup. He claims that he and his father both have special feelings for Hong Kong football and his father is very supportive of him joining the Hong Kong national team. He is willing to apply for a HKSAR passport to play for Hong Kong. He made his debut with Hong Kong on 28 December 2011 against Guangdong. In the match, he made a long pass from which Cheng Siu Wai scored the equalising goal. The match ended 2–2.

Sealy obtained Hong Kong passport in March 2013 and he became eligible to represent Hong Kong in international "A" matches. He made his debut for Hong Kong on 6 September 2013 against Myanmar, however, the match was not recognised as an international 'A' match by FIFA, as Myanmar made more than 6 substitutions. His first international 'A' match for Hong Kong should be on 10 September 2013 against Singapore.

== Honours ==
=== Club ===
HKFC

- Hong Kong Second Division: 2005–06, 2009–10

Sun Hei

- Hong Kong Senior Shield: 2011–12

=== International ===
Hong Kong

- Guangdong-Hong Kong Cup: 2012, 2013

== Career statistics ==
=== Club ===
As of 12 May 2013

Club performance			League		Cup		League Cup		Continental		Total	
Season	Club	League	Apps	Goals	Apps	Goals	Apps	Goals	Apps	Goals	Apps	Goals
Hong Kong			League		FA Cup & Shield		League Cup		Asia		Total	
2005–06	HKFC	Hong Kong Second Division	3	1	2	1	—		—		5	2
2006–07	HKFC	Hong Kong First Division	4	0	1	0	0	0	—		5	0
2007–08	HKFC	Hong Kong Second Division	3	0	0	0	—		—		3	0
2008–09	HKFC	Hong Kong Second Division	3	0	0	0	—		—		3	0
2009–10	HKFC	Hong Kong Second Division	1	0	—		—		—		1	0
2010–11	HKFC	Hong Kong First Division	18	1	2	0	2	0	—		22	1
Total	HKFC		32	2	5	1	2	0	0	0	39	3
2011–12	Sun Hei	Hong Kong First Division	15	0	4	0	0	0	—		19	0
Total	Sun Hei		15	0	4	0	0	0	0	0	19	0
2012–13	South China	Hong Kong First Division	12	0	9	0	0	0	—		21	0
Total	South China		12	0	9	0	0	0	—		21	0
Career total			59	2	18	1	2	0	0	0	79	3

=== International ===
As of 5 September 2017

National team	Year	Apps	Goals
Hong Kong	2013	1	0
Hong Kong	2014	5	0
Hong Kong	2015	6	0
Hong Kong	2016	5	0
Hong Kong	2017	6	0
Total		23	0
