= Wang Xinbo =

Chinese footballer

Wang Xinbo 王歆博
Personal information
- Full name: Wang Xinbo
- Date of birth: February 24, 1988 (age 38)
- Place of birth: Qingdao, Shandong, China
- Height: 1.87 m (6 ft 2 in)
- Position: Defender

Team information
- Current team: Qingdao Hainiu (assistant coach)

Youth career
- 2000–2007: Shandong Luneng

Senior career*
Years	Team	Apps	(Gls)
2007	Shandong Luneng	0	(0)
2008–2010	Jiangsu Sainty	18	(0)
2011	Nanchang Hengyuan	5	(0)
2012–2020	Shenzhen FC	85	(1)
2018	→ Meizhou Hakka (loan)	25	(1)
2020	→ Shenyang Urban (loan)	0	(0)

International career
2005	China U17		

Managerial career
- 2021–: Qingdao Hainiu (assistant)
Medal record
Representing China
Men's football
AFC U-17 Championship
Gold medal – first place	2004 Japan	Team
- * Club domestic league appearances and goals as of 31 December 2020

Wang Xinbo (Chinese: 王歆博; pinyin: Wáng Xīnbó; born 24 January 1988 in Qingdao), former name Wang Weilong (simplified Chinese: 王伟龙; traditional Chinese: 王偉龍; pinyin: Wáng Wěilóng before 10 August 2012) is a Chinese former professional footballer.

== Club career ==
While Wang Weilong began his football career by playing for the various Shandong Luneng youth squads for several seasons where he was never able make any senior level appearance for Shandong Luneng senior team. He transferred to Jiangsu Sainty in 2008 and was awarded the No.20 jersey. In the second tier he would go on to establish himself as a regular within the team and in his debut season he would help guide the club to win the division championship and promotion to the top tier of Chinese football.

He moved to fellow top tier club Nanchang Hengyuan in 2011 and would make his competitive debut on April 9, 2011 in a league game against Guangzhou Evergrande that ended in a 1-1 draw. After one season with Nanchang Hengyuan, Wang joined second tier club Shenzhen FC at the beginning of the 2012 league season on a three-year contract. After establishing himself as a regular for the club over the next several season Wang was allowed to join another second division team, Meizhou Hakka on loan for the 2018 league season.

== National team ==
Wang would be part of the Chinese under-17 national team that won the 2004 AFC U-17 Championship where he scored the winner in the final against North Korea. After that tournament China would qualify for the 2005 FIFA U-17 World Championship and Wang would also be included in that squad which reached the quarter-finals after being knocked out by Turkey.

== Career statistics ==
Statistics accurate as of match played 31 December 2020.

Appearances and goals by club, season and competition
Club	Season	League			National Cup		Continental		Other		Total	
Club	Season	Division	Apps	Goals	Apps	Goals	Apps	Goals	Apps	Goals	Apps	Goals
Shandong Luneng	2007	Chinese Super League	0	0	-		0	0	-		0	0
Jiangsu Sainty	2008	China League One	14	0	-		-		-		14	0
Jiangsu Sainty	2009	Chinese Super League	3	0	-		-		-		3	0
Jiangsu Sainty	2010	Chinese Super League	1	0	-		-		-		1	0
Jiangsu Sainty	Total		18	0	0	0	0	0	0	0	18	0
Nanchang Hengyuan	2011	Chinese Super League	5	0	1	0	-		-		6	0
Shenzhen FC	2012	China League One	10	0	0	0	-		-		10	0
Shenzhen FC	2013	China League One	7	0	2	0	-		-		9	0
Shenzhen FC	2014	China League One	13	0	1	0	-		-		14	0
Shenzhen FC	2015	China League One	19	0	1	0	-		-		20	0
Shenzhen FC	2016	China League One	10	0	0	0	-		-		10	0
Shenzhen FC	2017	China League One	20	1	2	1	-		-		22	2
Shenzhen FC	2019	Chinese Super League	6	0	1	0	-		-		7	0
Shenzhen FC	Total		85	1	7	1	0	0	0	0	92	2
Meizhou Hakka (Loan)	2018	China League One	25	1	0	0	-		-		25	1
Shenyang Urban (Loan)	2020	China League One	0	0	0	0	-		-		0	0
Career total			133	2	8	1	0	0	0	0	141	3

== Honours ==
=== Club ===
Jiangsu Sainty

- China League One: 2008

=== International ===
China U-17

- AFC U-17 Championship: 2004
