= Guo Zichao =

Chinese footballer (born 1989)

Guo Zichao 郭子超
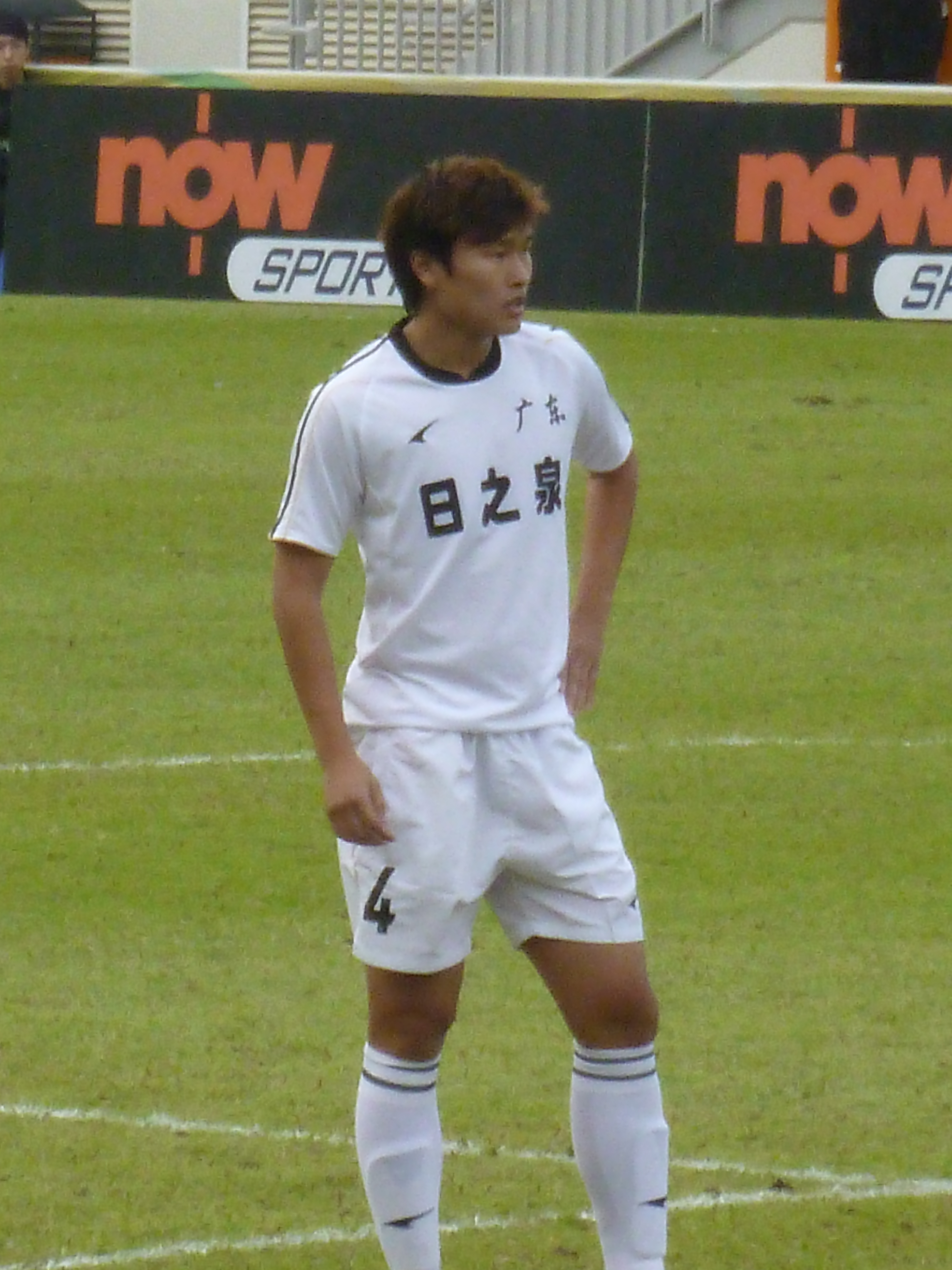

Personal information
- Date of birth: 25 January 1989 (age 37)
- Place of birth: Guangzhou, Guangdong, China
- Height: 1.79 m (5 ft 10 1/2 in)
- Position: Defender

Youth career
- 2005–2009: Guangzhou Pharmaceutical

Senior career*
Years	Team	Apps	(Gls)
2007–2009	Guangdong Sunray Cave	12	(0)
2010–2011	Guangzhou Evergrande	2	(0)
2012–2014	Guangdong Sunray Cave	62	(2)
2015–2017	Jiangxi Liansheng	53	(1)
2018–2019	Shenzhen Pengcheng	55	(1)

International career^{‡}
2009	China U-23		

Managerial career
- 2022–2023: Guangdong Women
- * Club domestic league appearances and goals as of 12 October 2019 ‡ National team caps and goals as of 31 January 2013

Guo Zichao (Chinese: 郭子超; pinyin: Guō Zǐchāo) (born 25 January 1989) is a former Chinese football player who plays as defender.

== Club career ==
Guo played for the Guangzhou Pharmaceutical youth team before he was loaned to China League Two club Guangdong Sunray Cave in the 2007. He made an impression within the team as Guangdong Sunray Cave won promotion to the second tier at the end of the 2008 season. After spending three season at Guangdong Sunray Cave, he returned to Guangzhou for the 2010 league campaign. He made his debut for Guangzhou on 10 April 2010, in a 3–3 away draw against Pudong Zobon. However, due to fierce competition in the team, he made just two appearances in the 2010 season. Guo was the part of the squad to win the 2011 Chinese Super League title, but he did not play any match in this season.

Without too much chances in Guangzhou Evergrande, Guo moved back to Guangdong Sunray Cave on a free transfer in January 2012.

In January 2015, Guo transferred to fellow China League One side Jiangxi Liansheng. In March 2018, Guo transferred to China League Two side Shenzhen Pengcheng.

On 21 May 2026, Guo was given a 5-year ban for match-fixing by the Chinese Football Association.

== Career statistics ==
Statistics accurate as of match played 12 October 2019.

Club performance			League		Cup		League Cup		Continental		Total	
Season	Club	League	Apps	Goals	Apps	Goals	Apps	Goals	Apps	Goals	Apps	Goals
China PR			League		FA Cup		CSL Cup		Asia		Total	
2007	Guangdong Sunray Cave	China League Two			-		-		-			
2008	Guangdong Sunray Cave	China League Two			-		-		-			
2009	Guangdong Sunray Cave	China League One	12	0	-		-		-		12	0
2010	Guangzhou Evergrande	China League One	2	0	-		-		-		2	0
2011	Guangzhou Evergrande	China Super League	0	0	0	0	-		-		0	0
2012	Guangdong Sunray Cave	China League One	22	0	2	0	-		-		24	0
2013	Guangdong Sunray Cave	China League One	19	0	3	0	-		-		22	0
2014	Guangdong Sunray Cave	China League One	21	2	1	0	-		-		22	2
2015	Jiangxi Liansheng	China League One	20	0	3	0	-		-		23	0
2016	Jiangxi Liansheng	China League Two	16	0	1	0	-		-		17	0
2017	Jiangxi Liansheng	China League Two	17	1	3	0	-		-		20	1
2018	Shenzhen Pengcheng	China League Two	27	0	1	0	-		-		28	0
2019	Shenzhen Pengcheng	China League Two	28	1	2	0	-		-		30	1
Total	China PR		184	4	16	0	0	0	0	0	200	4

== Honours ==
=== Club ===
Guangzhou Evergrande

- Chinese Super League: 2011
- China League One: 2010
