= Ge Zhen =

Chinese footballer

Ge Zhen 葛振
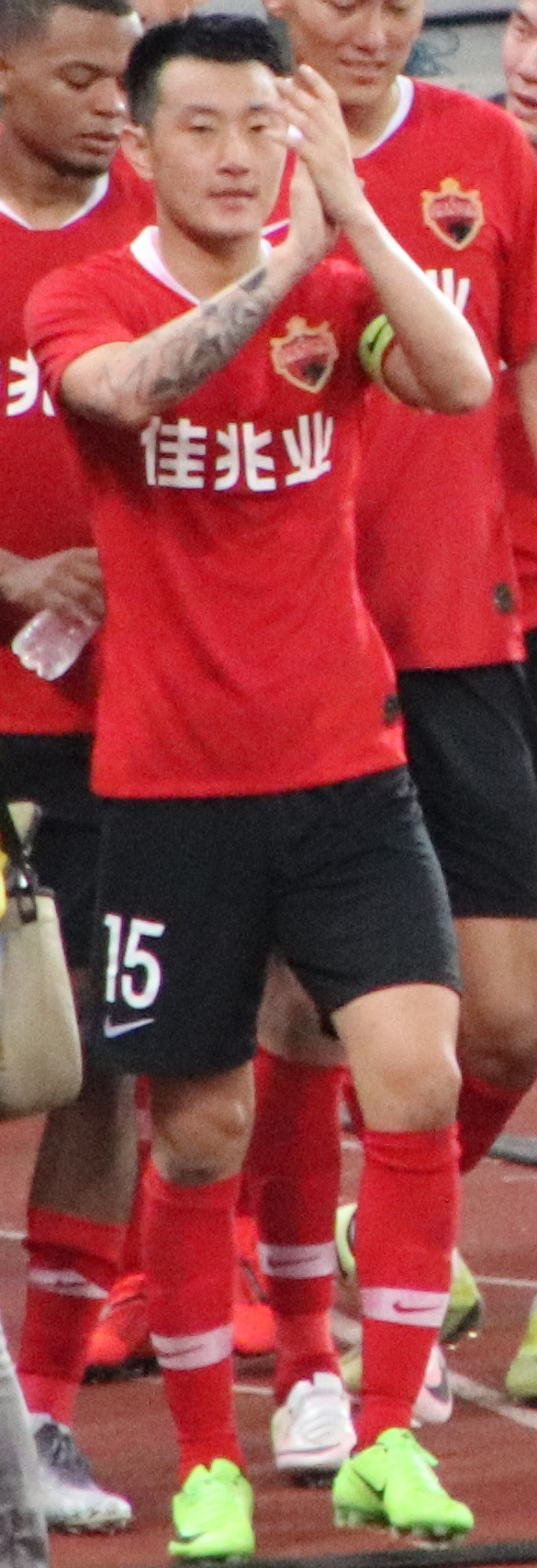
- Shenzhen Kaisa Player: Ge Zhen, 2019

Personal information
- Date of birth: 23 June 1987 (age 39)
- Place of birth: Qingdao, Shandong, China
- Height: 1.79 m (5 ft 10 1/2 in)
- Position: Defender

Team information
- Current team: Qingdao West Coast (assistant coach)

Youth career
- 2001–2003: Yunnan Hongta

Senior career*
Years	Team	Apps	(Gls)
2005–2010	Anhui Jiufang	65	(7)
2011–2012	Guangdong Sunray Cave	35	(0)
2013–2014	Shanghai Shenxin	41	(0)
2015–2017	Hangzhou Greentown	53	(0)
2018–2021	Shenzhen FC	61	(1)
2020	→ Meizhou Hakka (loan)	21	(0)
2022–2024	Qingdao West Coast	54	(1)

Managerial career
- 2026–: Qingdao West Coast (assistant)
- * Club domestic league appearances and goals as of 16 December 2022

Ge Zhen (Chinese: 葛振; pinyin: Gě Zhèn; born 23 June 1987 in Qingdao) is a Chinese former professional footballer who played as a defender.

== Club career ==
Ge started his professional career with China League Two side Anhui Jiufang in 2005. He made an impression within the team as Anhui won promotion to the second tier at the end of the 2007 season. In January 2011, Ge transferred to another China League One club Guangdong Sunray Cave after Anhui Jiufang dissolved. He played 35 league matches for Guangdong in the 2011 and 2012 season.

Ge moved to Chinese Super League side Shanghai Shenxin on a free transfer in January 2013. With a high prize by the team manager Zhu Jiong, he quickly established himself within the team. On 8 March 2013, he made his Super League debut in the first league match of the season which Shanghai Shenxin lost to Guangzhou Evergrande 5–1. He played 26 league matches in the 2013 season.

On 6 January 2015, Ge transferred to fellow Chinese Super League side Hangzhou Greentown. On 8 July 2015, he made his debut for Hangzhou in a 2015 Chinese FA Cup against Henan Jianye, coming on as a substitute for Wang Xiao in the 56th minute. He made his league debut for the club on 19 July 2015 in a 0–0 away draw against Henan Jianye. He played nine league matches for Hangzhou in the 2015 season as Hangzhou Greentown relegated to the second tier. He became a regular starter in the 2016 season and was promoted as team captain in the 2017 season.

On 2 January 2018, Ge joined China League One side Shenzhen FC on a free transfer. He would make his debut in a league game on 4 April 2018 against Beijing Enterprises Group F.C. in a 2-1 defeat. After the game he would gradually establish himself as a regular within the team and go on to win promotion with the club at the end of the 2018 China League One campaign. After three seasons with the club he was loaned out to second tier club Meizhou Hakka where he played in a 21 league games to help guide the club to gain promotion to the top tier after coming second within the division at the end of the 2021 China League One campaign. On 28 January 2022, Ge would transfer to second tier club Qingdao Youth Island on a free transfer.

On 27th October 2024, Ge retired from professional football after the home game against Chengdu Rongcheng.

=== Coaching career ===
On 16 February 2026, Ge was named as the assistant coach of Qingdao West Coast.

== Career statistics ==
Statistics accurate as of match played 16 December 2022.

Appearances and goals by club, season and competition
Club	Season	League			National Cup		Continental		Other		Total	
Club	Season	Division	Apps	Goals	Apps	Goals	Apps	Goals	Apps	Goals	Apps	Goals
Anhui Jiufang	2005	China League Two			-		-		-			
Anhui Jiufang	2006	China League Two			-		-		-			
Anhui Jiufang	2007	China League Two			-		-		-			
Anhui Jiufang	2008	China League One	22	0	-		-		-		22	0
Anhui Jiufang	2009	China League One	22	6	-		-		-		22	6
Anhui Jiufang	2010	China League One	21	1	-		-		-		21	1
Anhui Jiufang	Total		65	7	0	0	0	0	0	0	65	7
Guangdong Sunray Cave	2011	China League One	16	0	0	0	-		-		16	0
Guangdong Sunray Cave	2012	China League One	19	0	1	0	-		-		20	0
Guangdong Sunray Cave	Total		35	0	1	0	0	0	0	0	36	0
Shanghai Shenxin	2013	Chinese Super League	26	0	0	0	-		-		26	0
Shanghai Shenxin	2014	Chinese Super League	15	0	1	0	-		-		16	0
Shanghai Shenxin	Total		41	0	1	0	0	0	0	0	42	0
Hangzhou Greentown	2015	Chinese Super League	9	0	1	0	-		-		10	0
Hangzhou Greentown	2016	Chinese Super League	20	0	1	0	-		-		21	0
Hangzhou Greentown	2017	China League One	24	0	2	0	-		-		26	0
Hangzhou Greentown	Total		53	0	4	0	0	0	0	0	57	0
Shenzhen	2018	China League One	27	1	0	0	-		-		27	1
Shenzhen	2019	Chinese Super League	22	0	0	0	-		-		22	0
Shenzhen	2020	Chinese Super League	12	0	0	0	-		-		12	0
Shenzhen	Total		61	1	0	0	0	0	0	0	61	1
Meizhou Hakka (Loan)	2021	China League One	21	0	0	0	-		-		21	0
Qingdao Youth Island	2022	China League One	27	1	0	0	-		-		27	1
Career total			303	9	6	0	0	0	0	0	309	9
