= Tan Binliang =

Chinese footballer

Personal information
- Date of birth: 4 November 1989 (age 36)
- Place of birth: Shenzhen, Guangdong, China
- Height: 1.74 m (5 ft 9 in)
- Position: Midfielder

Youth career
- Shenzhen FC

Senior career*
Years	Team	Apps	(Gls)
–2013	Guangdong Sunray Cave		
2013	Jönköpings Södra	0	(0)
2013–2020	Shenzhen FC	41	(2)
2018	→ Nantong Zhiyun (loan)	19	(5)
2020	→ Nanjing City (loan)	5	(0)
2021	Nanjing City	7	(0)
2021	→ Shanxi Longjin (loan)	6	(0)
2022	Jiangxi Beidamen	16	(0)
2023	Shenzhen Juniors	0	(0)
- * Club domestic league appearances and goals as of 27 April 2022

Tan Binliang (Chinese: 谭宾凉; born 4 November 1989) is a Chinese footballer who plays as a midfielder.

== Career ==
Before the 2013 season, Tan signed for Jönköpings Södra in Sweden after playing for Chinese second division side Guangdong Sunray Cave, becoming the first Chinese player to play in Sweden, where he suffered an injury and from loneliness.

In 2013, Tan signed for Chinese second division club Shenzhen FC, where he made over 27 league appearances and scored over 0 goals.

Before the 2018 season, Tan was sent on loan to Nantong Zhiyun in the Chinese third division, where he suffered a broken leg.

Before the 2021 season, he signed for Chinese second division team Nanjing City.
