= Huang Fengtao =

Chinese footballer

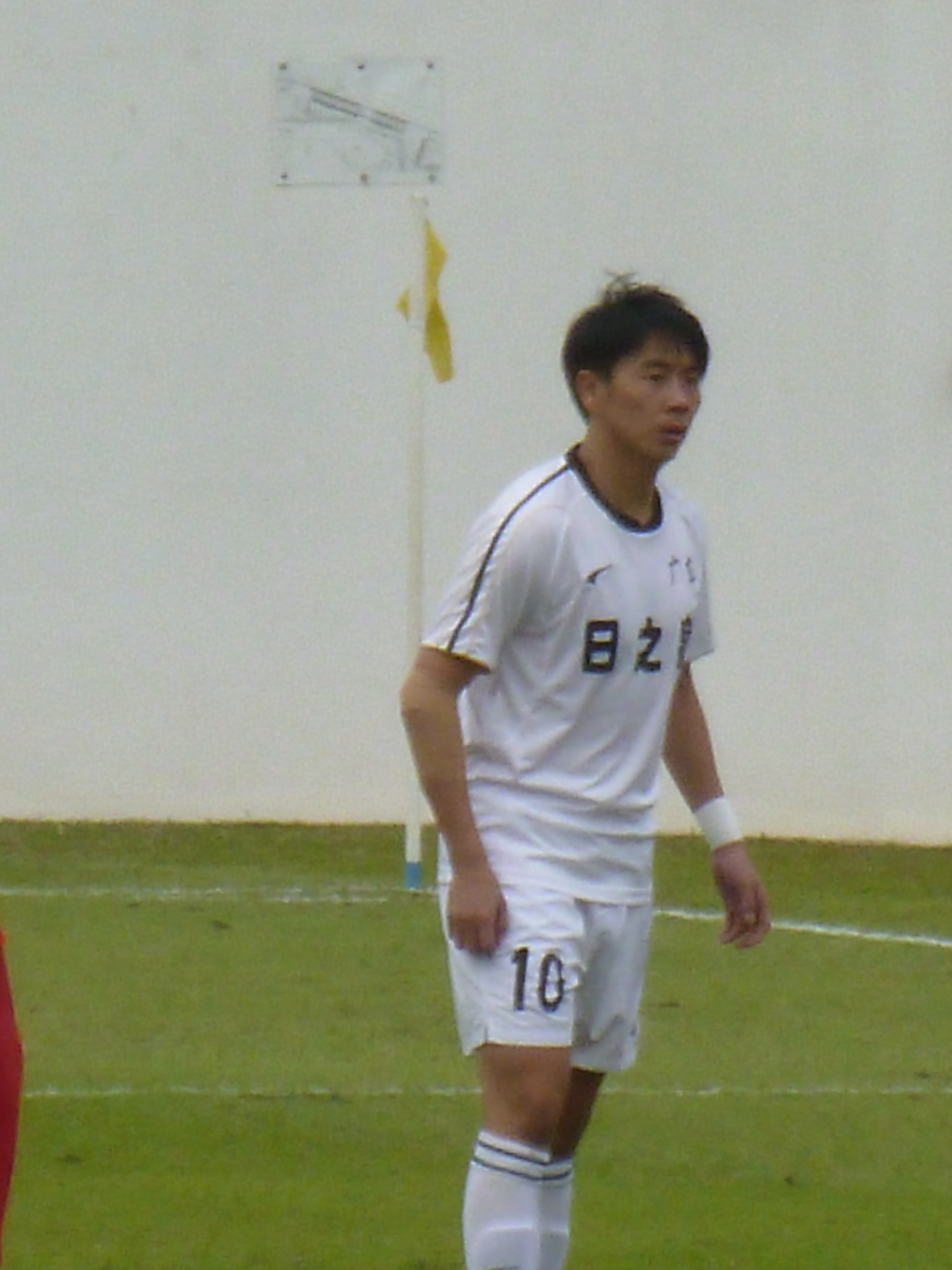

Personal information
- Date of birth: June 17, 1985 (age 41)
- Place of birth: Haifeng, Guangdong, China
- Height: 1.77 m (5 ft 9 1/2 in)
- Position: Striker

Senior career*
Years	Team	Apps	(Gls)
2003–2012	Shenzhen Ruby	172	(23)
2013	Hangzhou Greentown	10	(0)
2014–2015	Shijiazhuang Ever Bright	31	(6)
2016	Wuhan Zall	15	(0)
2017–2018	Shenzhen Ledman	24	(1)
- * Club domestic league appearances and goals as of 13 October 2018

Huang Fengtao (simplified Chinese: 黄凤涛; traditional Chinese: 黃鳳濤, born June 17, 1985) is a Chinese football player who currently plays as a striker for Shenzhen Ledman.

== Club career ==
Huang Fengtao started his professional football career at Shenzhen Jianlibao at the beginning of the 2003 league season after graduating from their youth team. He would go on to make his debut against Bayi Football Team on April 17, 2003, in a 5–1 victory, which was followed several months later with his debut goal against Yunnan Hongta F.C. on October 12, 2003, in a league game that ended in a 1–0 victory. Despite making an impression in his debut season he would miss the majority of the 2004 league season when Shenzhen won the league Chinese Super League title when he dropped in favour of the experienced former international Yang Chen and the emerging Zheng Zhi. He was allowed to reaffirm his position in the Shenzhen team when he played in a further 13 games with two goals in the 2005 league season. Since then he would continue to progress his position at Shenzhen by establishing himself the next season by playing in a further 22 games and confirming his position as Shenzhens first choice striker. In February 2014, Huang transferred to China League One side Shijiazhuang Yongchan. On 25 February 2016, Huang transferred to fellow China League One side Wuhan Zall.

On 10 January 2017, Huang moved to League Two side Shenzhen Ledman.

== Club career statistics ==
Statistics accurate as of match played 13 October 2018.

Season	Team	Country	Division	Apps	Goals
2003	Shenzhen Jianlibao	China	1	11	1
2004	Shenzhen Jianlibao	China	1	0	0
2005	Shenzhen Jianlibao	China	1	13	2
2006	Shenzhen Kingway	China	1	22	1
2007	Shenzhen Shangqingyin	China	1	15	0
2008	Shenzhen Shangqingyin	China	1	14	0
2009	Shenzhen Asia Travel F.C.	China	1	23	7
2010	Shenzhen Ruby F.C.	China	1	27	2
2011	Shenzhen Ruby F.C.	China	1	27	6
2012	Shenzhen Ruby F.C.	China	2	20	4
2013	Hangzhou Greentown	China	1	10	0
2014	Shijiazhuang Yongchan	China	2	21	5
2015	Shijiazhuang Yongchan	China	1	10	1
2016	Wuhan Zall	China	2	15	0
2017	Shenzhen Ledman	China	3	24	1
2018	Shenzhen Ledman	China	3	0	0
