= Liu Chun Fai =

Hong Kong footballer and coach

- Traditional Chinese: 廖俊輝
- Simplified Chinese: 廖俊辉
Transcriptions
Standard Mandarin
- Hanyu Pinyin: Liào Jùnhuī
- Wade–Giles: Liao Chün-hui
- Yale Romanization: Lyào Jyùnhwēi
- IPA: [ljâʊ tɕŷnxwéɪ]
Yue: Cantonese
- Yale Romanization: Liuh Jeun Faī
- Jyutping: liu^{6} zeon^{3} fai^{1}
- IPA: [lìːu tsɵ̄n fɐ́i]

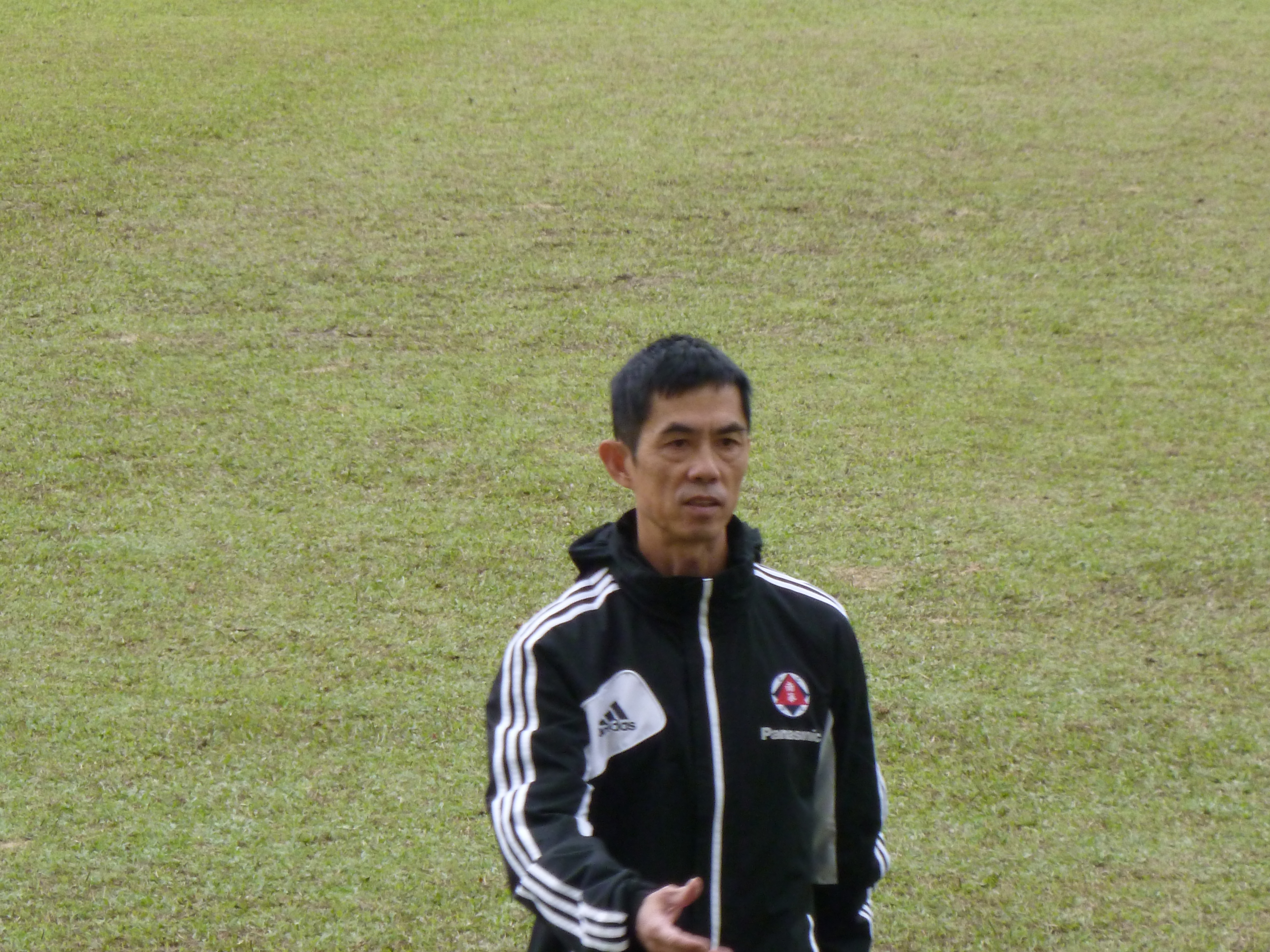
Liu in 2012

Raymond Liu Chun Fai (Chinese: 廖俊輝; born 1956) is a football coach and former goalkeeper from Hong Kong.

== Club career ==
In his player career, he played for Happy Valley, Caroline Hill, Sea Bee, Eastern, Harps, Seiko, May Ching, Lai Sun and Sing Tao.

== Managerial career ==
He retired in the early 1990s to become a coach. He was the coach of Hong Kong 09, Yau Tsim Mong and Citizen. He started at Citizen as a goalkeeper coach, and in 2006 he became the head coach of the team. In 2007-08 season, he led the team to finish second in Hong Kong First Division and captured the champion of Hong Kong FA Cup, the first major trophy won by the team ever. With this outstanding result, he was awarded the Best Coach Award of the season.

On 5 February 2018, Liu was named as interim coach of the Hong Kong national football team following the resignation of Kim Pan-gon in December 2017.

== Honours ==
=== Manager ===
Citizen

- Hong Kong First Division: 2007–08

South China

- Hong Kong First Division: 2012–13

=== Assistant manager ===
South China

- Hong Kong First Division: 2008–09, 2009–10
- Hong Kong FA Cup: 2010–11
