= Li Weijun =

Chinese footballer

Li Weijun 李伟军
Personal information
- Full name: Li Weijun
- Date of birth: February 1, 1981 (age 45)
- Place of birth: Meizhou, Guangdong, PR China
- Height: 1.84 m (6 ft 0 in)
- Position: Goalkeeper

Team information
- Current team: Meizhou Hakka (caretaker)

Youth career
- 2006: Guangdong University of Technology

Senior career*
Years	Team	Apps	(Gls)
2001–2004	Shenzhen Kejian	12	(0)
2004–2005	Dongguan Nancheng	?	(?)
2005–2008	Anhui Jiufang	?	(?)
2008	South China	4	(0)
2009–2012	Guangdong Sunray Cave	70	(0)
2013–2016	Meizhou Kejia	32	(0)

Managerial career
- 2018: Meizhou Hakka (caretaker)
- * Club domestic league appearances and goals as of 10 October 2015

Li Weijun (simplified Chinese: 李伟军; traditional Chinese: 李偉軍; pinyin: Li Wěijūn; born 1 February 1981 in China) is a former professional Chinese football goalkeeper.

== Club career ==
He would move on a free transfer to second tier Chinese football club Guangdong Sunray Cave where he remained for four seasons before joining third-tier club Meizhou Kejia where he was part of the team that won the division championship. After helping guide the club to safety within the division the following season Li decided to retire from football. He would move on a free transfer to second tier Chinese football club Guangdong Sunray Cave where he remained for four seasons before joining third-tier club Meizhou Kejia where he was part of the team that won the division championship. After helping guide the club to safety within the division the following season Li decided to retire from football.

== Career statistics ==
As of 1 November 2016

Club			League		Cup		League Cup		Continental		Others		Total	
Season	Club	League	Apps	Goals	Apps	Goals	Apps	Goals	Apps	Goals	Apps	Goals	Apps	Goals
China PR			League		FA Cup		CSL Cup		Asia		Others		Total	
2003	Shenzhen Kejian	China League One	1	0	?	0	-	-	-	-	-	-	1	0
2004	Shenzhen Kejian	China League One	11	0	?	0	-	-	-	-	-	-	11	0
2005	Dongguan Nancheng	China League Two	?	0	-	-	-	-	-	-	-	-	?	0
2006	Anhui Jiufang	China League Two	?	0	-	-	-	-	-	-	-	-	?	0
2007	Anhui Jiufang	China League Two	?	0	-	-	-	-	-	-	-	-	?	0
Hong Kong			League		Senior Shield		League Cup		Asia		FA Cup		Total	
2008-09	South China	Hong Kong First Division League	3 (1)	0	0 (0)	0	0 (0)	0	0 (0)	0	0 (0)	0	3 (1)	0
China PR			League		FA Cup		CSL Cup		Asia		Others		Total	
2009	Guangdong Sunray Cave	China League One	16	0	-	-	-	-	-	-	-	-	16	0
2010	Guangdong Sunray Cave	China League One	17	0	-	-	-	-	-	-	-	-	17	0
2011	Guangdong Sunray Cave	China League One	13	0	3	0	-	-	-	-	-	-	16	0
2012	Guangdong Sunray Cave	China League One	24	0	0	0	-	-	-	-	-	-	24	0
2013	Meizhou Kejia	China League Two	?	0	-	-	-	-	-	-	-	-	?	0
2014	Meizhou Kejia	China League Two	0	0	1	0	-	-	-	-	-	-	1	0
2015	Meizhou Kejia	China League Two	10	0	3	0	-	-	-	-	-	-	13	0
2016	Meizhou Kejia	China League One	12	0	1	0	-	-	-	-	-	-	13	0
Career total			?	0	?	0	0	0	0	0	0	0	?	0

== Honours ==
Meizhou Kejia

- China League Two: 2015
