= Zhu Cong (footballer) =

Chinese footballer

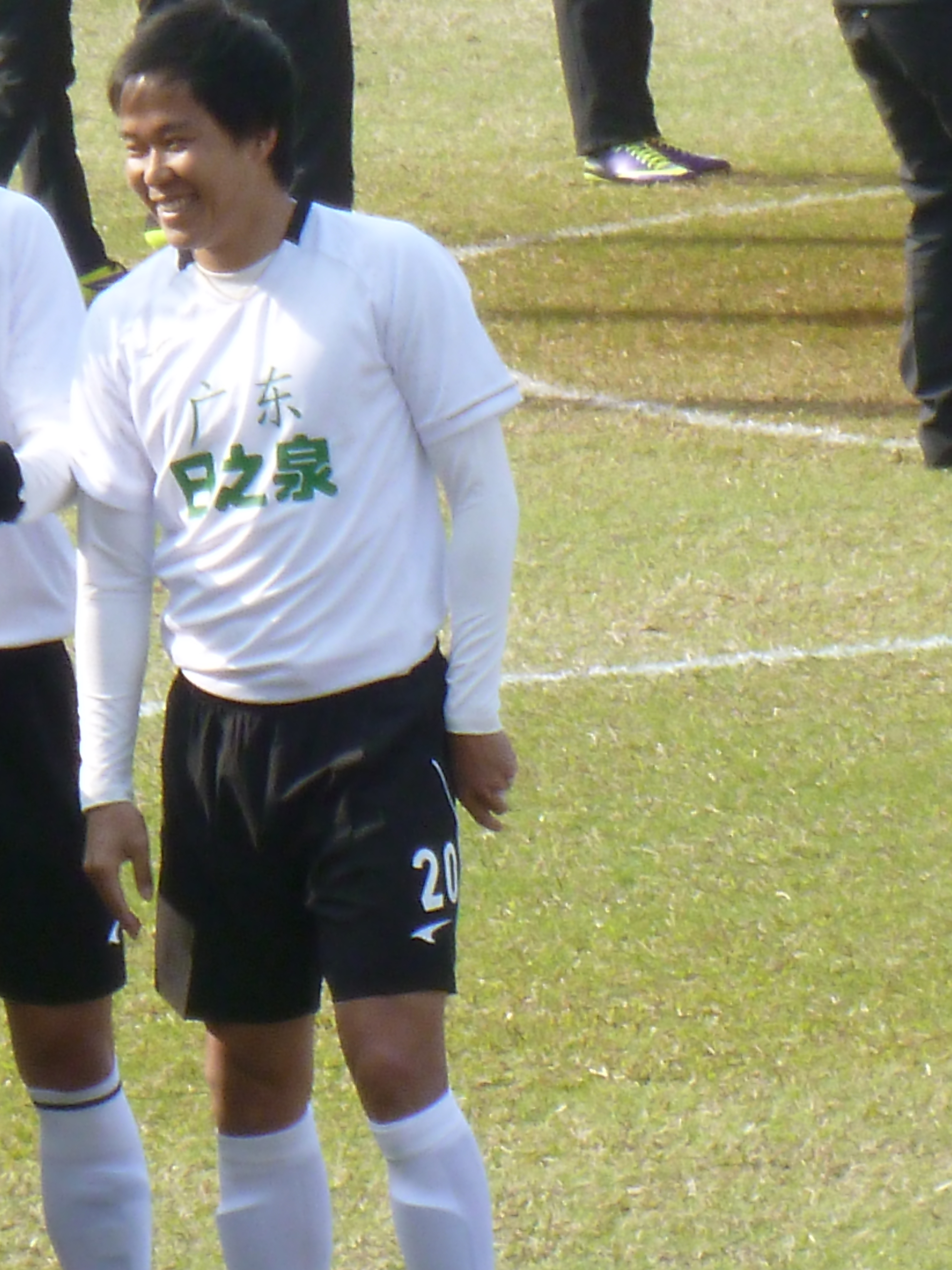

Personal information
- Date of birth: 8 February 1985 (age 41)
- Place of birth: Wuchuan, Guangdong, China
- Height: 1.75 m (5 ft 9 in)
- Position: Defender

Youth career
- Shenzhen Jianlibao

Senior career*
Years	Team	Apps	(Gls)
2003–2010	Shenzhen Ruby	6	(0)
2010–2014	Guangdong Sunray Cave	70	(0)
2015–2018	Shenzhen Renren	23	(1)
- * Club domestic league appearances and goals as of 13 October 2018

Zhu Cong (simplified Chinese: 朱聪; traditional Chinese: 朱聰; pinyin: Zhū Cōng; born 8 February 1985) is a Chinese retired footballer as a full back.

== Club career ==
Zhu started his professional career with Chinese Jia-A League side Shenzhen Jianlibao in 2003. On 19 August 2006, he made his senior debut in a 5–0 away defeat against Dalian Shide, coming on as a substitute for Fan Xiaodong in the 76th minute. He failed to establish himself within the first team and just played 6 league matches between 2004 and 2010. Zhu transferred to China League One club Guangdong Sunray Cave in July 2010.

In 2015, Zhu signed for Shenzhen Renren.

== Career statistics ==
Statistics accurate as of match played 13 October 2018.

Club performance			League		Cup		League Cup		Continental		Total	
Season	Club	League	Apps	Goals	Apps	Goals	Apps	Goals	Apps	Goals	Apps	Goals
China PR			League		FA Cup		CSL Cup		Asia		Total	
2003	Shenzhen Ruby	Chinese Jia-A League	0	0	0	0	-		-		0	0
2004	Shenzhen Ruby	Chinese Super League	0	0	0	0	0	0	-		0	0
2005	Shenzhen Ruby	Chinese Super League	0	0	0	0	0	0	0	0	0	0
2006	Shenzhen Ruby	Chinese Super League	1	0	0	0	-		-		1	0
2007	Shenzhen Ruby	Chinese Super League	4	0	-		-		-		4	0
2008	Shenzhen Ruby	Chinese Super League	0	0	-		-		-		0	0
2009	Shenzhen Ruby	Chinese Super League	1	0	-		-		-		1	0
2010	Shenzhen Ruby	Chinese Super League	0	0	-		-		-		0	0
2010	Guangdong Sunray Cave	China League One	10	0	-		-		-		10	0
2011	Guangdong Sunray Cave	China League One	24	0	1	0	-		-		25	0
2012	Guangdong Sunray Cave	China League One	20	0	1	0	-		-		21	0
2013	Guangdong Sunray Cave	China League One	2	0	0	0	-		-		2	0
2014	Guangdong Sunray Cave	China League One	14	0	1	0	-		-		15	0
2016	Shenzhen Renren	China League Two	15	0	1	0	-		-		16	0
2017	Shenzhen Renren	China League Two	6	0	1	0	-		-		7	0
2018	Shenzhen Renren	China League Two	2	1	0	0	-		-		2	1
Total	China PR		99	1	5	0	0	0	0	0	104	1

== Honours ==
=== Club ===
Shenzhen Jianlibao

- Chinese Super League: 2004
