= Yuan Lin =

Chinese footballer

Yuan Lin 袁琳
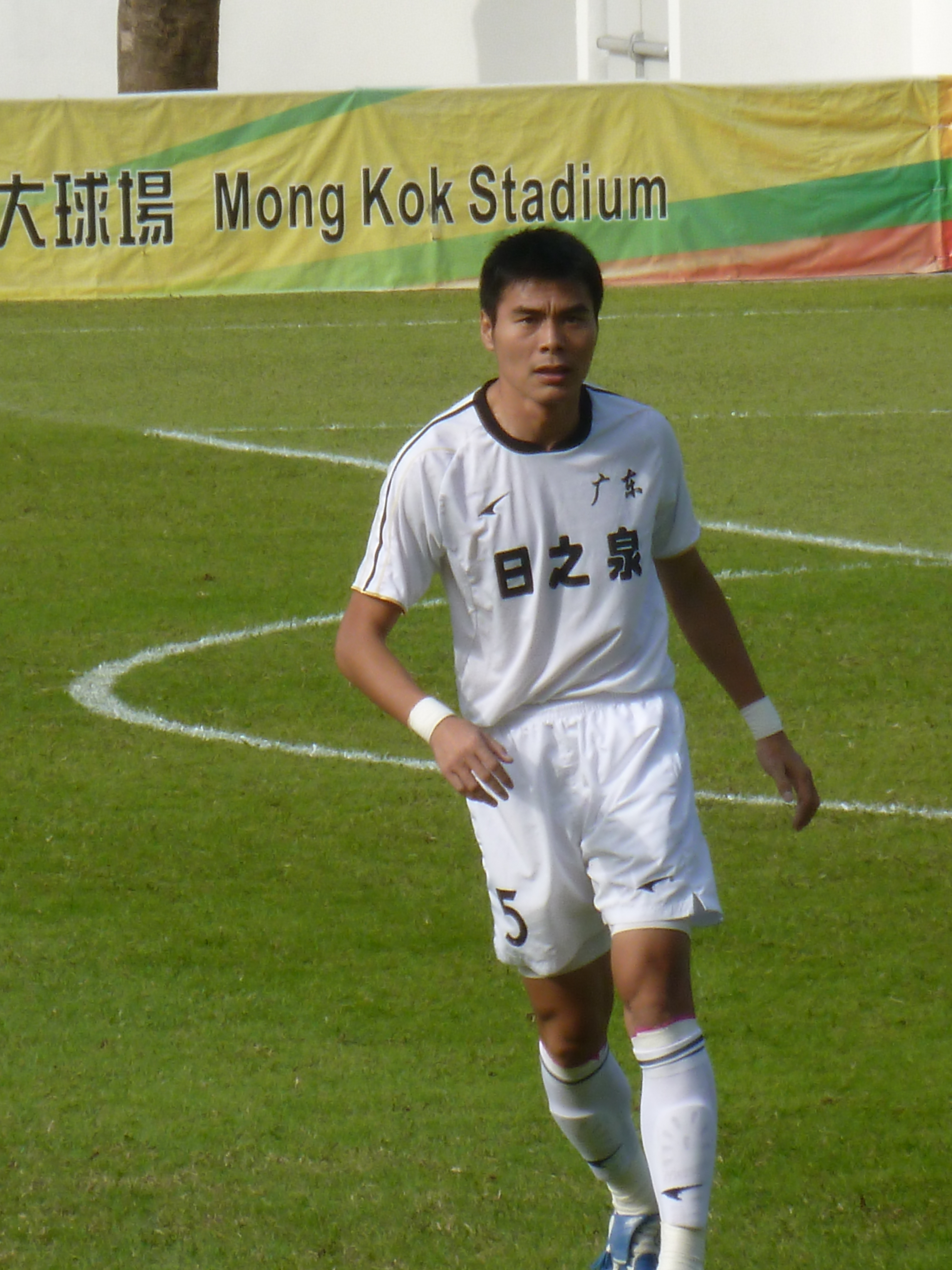

Personal information
- Date of birth: February 26, 1977 (age 49)
- Place of birth: Guangzhou, Guangdong, China
- Height: 1.82 m (6 ft 0 in)
- Position: Defender

Youth career
- 1993–1996: Guangzhou Apollo
- 1996–1998: Shenzhen Ping'an

Senior career*
Years	Team	Apps	(Gls)
1998–2011	Shenzhen Ruby	286	(8)
2012	Shenzhen Fengpeng	30	(6)
2013–2014	Meizhou Wuhua	23	(2)
2015–2017	Shenzhen Renren	32	(3)
2018–2019	Shenzhen Pengcheng	25	(0)
- * Club domestic league appearances and goals as of 12 October 2019

Yuan Lin (Chinese: 袁琳; born February 26, 1977) is a Chinese football player who plays as a defender.

== Club career ==
Yuan Lin started his career at Guangzhou Apollo youth team at the age of 12, however he was unable to graduate into the senior team at the end of the 1996 league season. At the beginning of the 1997 league season he moved to Shenzhen Ping'an who were in the second tier and fighting for promotion to the top tier of the Chinese league system. While Shenzhen were promoted after coming second in the league Yuan Lin spent the majority of the season in the reserves that trained in Italy.

It was not until the 1999 league season that Yuan Lin established himself within the team playing as a versatile centre-back or left-back. With Yuan Lin firmly established in the squad Shenzhen continued to progress to a higher position each season within the league until they surprised many by winning the Chinese Super League in the 2004 league season. However, despite Shenzhen's success influential manager Zhu Guanghu and several major players left the club at the end of the 2005 season. Yuan Lin remained at the club and become an unsung spiritual leader in the team throughout six consecutive relation survivals.

However, in 2011 season Yuan Lin's legendary career at Shenzhen died in vain. After kindly making a tactical suggestion to new manager Philippe Troussier during a pre-season friendly, Yuan Lin was constantly dropped out of teamsheet possibly as a set-up example to establish youngsters refreshingly into the 1st team, despite the defensive line clearly needing an experienced commanding-veteran to stop the ball leaking through heavily. Yuan Lin only made 7 appearances in the whole season and hardly got the chance to save Shenzhen from relegation. He even got mis-labeled in a so-called "strike of the seven" by the end of season after the relegation was confirmed. The day after the season ended, Yuan Lin left the club with his contract expired and unlikely to be renewed after 15 years of loyal service.

Despite receiving several good offers Yuan Lin decided to stay at Shenzhen and joined Shenzhen Fengpeng, alongside other formerly Shenzhen Ruby founders of this new club. In the 2012 season at Yi League, Yuan Lin was ever-present captain and the commander of defense, also scored crucial goals to secure a playoff spot and runner-up in Southern Division. He appeared in every minute of the 2012 league season, playing in all 30 League Two games for Shenzhen Fengpeng.

Yuan signed a contract with fellow China League Two side Shenzhen Renren in 2015.

== Honours ==
Shenzhen

- Chinese Super League: 2004
