= 31st Guangdong–Hong Kong Cup =

The 31st Guangdong-Hong Kong Cup was held in January 2009. Defending champions Hong Kong played against Guangdong at Yuexiushan Stadium on 1 January in the first leg and the second leg was played at Mong Kok Stadium on 4 January. Hong Kong football representative team represented Hong Kong Team this year instead of Hong Kong League XI and 2008 Chinese third-tier league runners-up Guangdong Sunray Cave (Guangdong U19s) replaced Guangzhou FC as Guangdong Team to participate in this tournament. Hong Kong won 5–4 on aggregate and were crowned their 13th Guangdong-Hong Kong Cup champions.

== Squads ==
=== Guangdong ===
- Manager: Cao Yang
- Assistant managers: Guan Zhirui, He Weiwen, Zhong Weimin

No.	Pos.	Player	Date of birth (age)	Caps	Club
22	GK	(China) Hou Yu	20 December 1990 (age 18)		(China) Guangdong Sunray Cave
23	GK	(China) Zhi Silong	1 February 1989 (age 19)		(China) Guangdong Sunray Cave
1	GK	(China) Zhang Xunwei	28 February 1989 (age 19)		(China) Shenzhen Xiangxue Eisiti
4	DF	(China) Chen Jianlong (captain)	14 May 1989 (age 19)		(China) Guangdong Sunray Cave
5	DF	(China) Liu Sheng	8 September 1989 (age 19)		(China) Guangdong Sunray Cave
3	DF	(China) Guo Zichao	25 January 1989 (age 19)		(China) Guangdong Sunray Cave
2	DF	(China) Wang Chao	19 December 1989 (age 19)		(China) Guangdong Sunray Cave
7	DF	(China) Xu Weilong	16 June 1989 (age 19)		(China) Guangdong Sunray Cave
21	DF	(China) Liu Yuchen	3 January 1989 (age 19)		(China) Guangdong Sunray Cave
28	DF	(China) Huang Jiaqiang	14 March 1990 (age 18)		(China) Guangdong Sunray Cave
29	DF	(China) Chen Haibin	5 June 1989 (age 19)		(China) Guangdong Sunray Cave
25	DF	(China) Deng Zhigang	20 April 1989 (age 19)		(China) Guangdong Sunray Cave
10	MF	(China) Pan Jia	1 October 1989 (age 19)		(China) Guangdong Sunray Cave
6	MF	(China) Tan Binliang	4 November 1989 (age 19)		(China) Guangdong Sunray Cave
15	MF	(China) Zhao Huang	2 January 1989 (age 19)		(China) Guangdong Sunray Cave
17	MF	(China) Yu Jianfeng	29 January 1989 (age 19)		(China) Guangdong Sunray Cave
18	MF	(China) Yin Hongbo	30 October 1989 (age 19)		(China) Guangdong Sunray Cave
20	MF	(China) Peng Shaoxiong	27 May 1989 (age 19)		(China) Guangdong Sunray Cave
16	MF	(China) Li Jian	1 March 1989 (age 19)		(China) Guangdong Sunray Cave
11	FW	(China) Cong Tianhao	14 March 1989 (age 19)		(China) Guangdong Sunray Cave
9	FW	(China) Ye Weichao	18 February 1989 (age 19)		(China) Guangdong Sunray Cave
13	FW	(China) Shi Liang	11 May 1989 (age 19)		(China) Guangdong Sunray Cave
19	FW	(China) Li Jiaqi	25 March 1989 (age 19)		(China) Guangdong Sunray Cave
14	FW	(China) Lei Yongchi	2 January 1989 (age 19)		(China) Shenzhen Xiangxue Eisiti

=== Hong Kong ===
- Team Manager: Leung Hung Tak Brian, Pui Kwan Kay, Steven Lo
- Admin Secretary: Lim Fong Kee
- Coach: Goran Paulić, Dejan Antonić
- Goalkeeper Coach: Chu Kwok Kuen
- Physio: Lui Yat Hong
- Team Assistant: Kwan Kon Sang

No.	Pos.	Player	Date of birth (age)	Caps	Club
1	GK	(Hong Kong) Li Hon Ho	14 July 1986 (age 22)		(Hong Kong) NTR WF Tai Po
19	GK	(Hong Kong) Fan Chun Yip	2 May 1976 (age 32)		(Hong Kong) Happy Valley
22	GK	(Hong Kong) Tse Tak Him	10 February 1985 (age 23)		(Hong Kong) Citizen
20	DF	(Hong Kong) Poon Yiu Cheuk	19 September 1977 (age 31)		(Hong Kong) South China
15	DF	(Hong Kong) Chan Wai Ho	24 April 1982 (age 26)		(Hong Kong) South China
2	DF	(Hong Kong) Lee Chi Ho	16 November 1982 (age 26)		(Hong Kong) South China
3	DF	(Hong Kong) Gerard	21 September 1978 (age 30)		(Hong Kong) Happy Valley
18	DF	(Hong Kong) Liu Quankun	17 February 1983 (age 25)		(Hong Kong) Kitchee
30	DF	(Hong Kong) Cristiano Cordeiro	14 August 1973 (age 35)		(Hong Kong) Convoy Sun Hei
5	DF	(Hong Kong) Lee Wai Lun	7 March 1981 (age 27)		(Hong Kong) Convoy Sun Hei
4	DF	(Hong Kong) Ng Wai Chiu	22 October 1981 (age 27)		(China) Shanghai Shenhua
6	MF	(Hong Kong) Gao Wen	18 January 1985 (age 23)		(Hong Kong) Kitchee
12	MF	(Hong Kong) Lo Kwan Yee	9 October 1984 (age 24)		(Hong Kong) Kitchee
8	MF	(Hong Kong) Xu Deshuai	12 June 1987 (age 21)		(Hong Kong) Citizen
16	MF	(Hong Kong) Leung Chun Pong	1 October 1986 (age 22)		(Hong Kong) Happy Valley
25	MF	(Hong Kong) Wong Chin Hung	2 March 1982 (age 26)		(Hong Kong) TSW Pegasus
14	MF	(Hong Kong) Lo Chi Kwan	18 March 1981 (age 27)		(Hong Kong) Convoy Sun Hei
7	FW	(Hong Kong) Chan Siu Ki	14 July 1985 (age 23)		(Hong Kong) South China
9	FW	(Hong Kong) Cheng Siu Wai	27 December 1981 (age 27)		(Hong Kong) TSW Pegasus
21	FW	(Hong Kong) Lee Wai Lim	5 May 1981 (age 27)		(Hong Kong) NTR WF Tai Po
26	FW	(Hong Kong) Chao Pengfei	17 July 1987 (age 21)		(Hong Kong) Happy Valley

== Results ==
2009-01-01
15:00 GMT+8

Guangdong	3 – 1	Hong Kong
Shi Liang 15', 33'; Zhao Huang 53'	(Report)	Chan Siu Ki 54'

Yuexiushan Stadium, Guangzhou
Attendance: 18,000
Referee: Sun Bing

2009-01-04
15:15 GMT+8

Hong Kong	4 – 1 (a.e.t.)	Guangdong
Chan Siu Ki 31'; Lee Wai Lim 45'; Xu Deshuai 49'; Leung Chun Pong 94'	(Report)	Yin Hongbo 74' (pen.)

Mong Kok Stadium, Hong Kong
Attendance: 3,395
Referee: Ng Kai Lam
