= Xu Deshuai =

Hong Kong footballer (born 1987)

Xu Deshuai 徐德帥
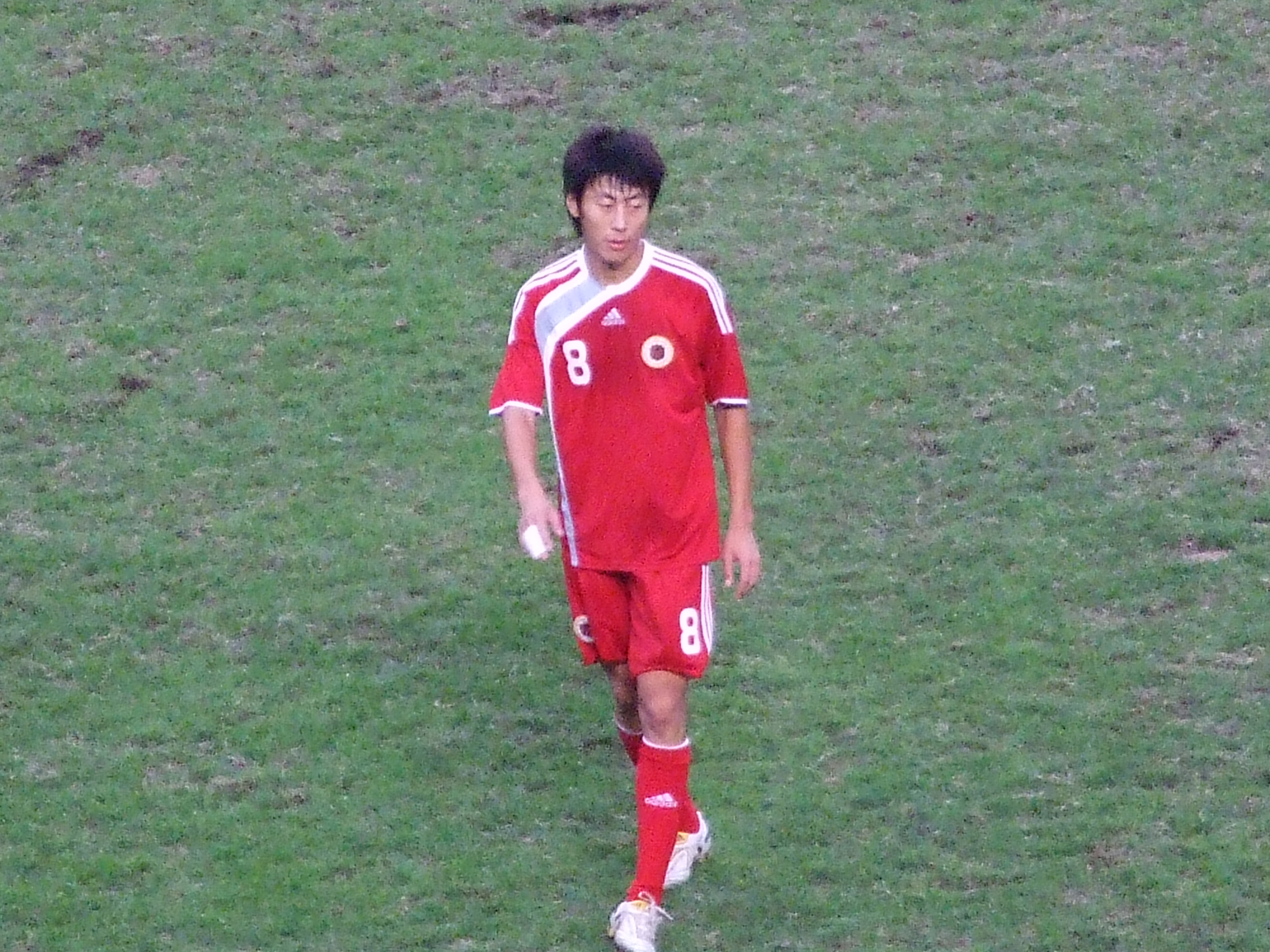
- Xu in the Gold medal match of the football tournament at the 2009 East Asian Games

Personal information
- Full name: Xu Deshuai
- Date of birth: 13 July 1987 (age 39)
- Place of birth: Dalian, Liaoning, China
- Height: 1.80 m (5 ft 11 in)
- Position: Winger

Youth career
- 2004–2005: Dalian Shide

Senior career*
Years	Team	Apps	(Gls)
2004–2008	Dalian Shide	0	(0)
2005–2008	→ Citizen (loan)	31	(0)
2008–2010	Citizen	37	(8)
2010–2012	South China	26	(4)
2012–2013	Pegasus	17	(2)
2013–2015	Kitchee	22	(8)
2015–2020	Eastern	50	(3)

International career^{‡}
2005–2006	China U19	3	(1)
2009–2010	Hong Kong U23	8	(1)
2008–2019	Hong Kong	39	(4)
Medal record
Representing Hong Kong
East Asian Games
Gold medal – first place	2009 Hong Kong	Football
- * Club domestic league appearances and goals as of 1 June 2020 ‡ National team caps and goals as of 10 October 2019

Xu Deshuai

Chinese name
- Traditional Chinese: 徐德帥
- Simplified Chinese: 徐德帅
Transcriptions
Standard Mandarin
- Hanyu Pinyin: Xú Déshuài
Yue: Cantonese
- Jyutping: ceoi^{4} dak^{1} seoi^{3}

Vietnamese name
- Vietnamese: Từ Đức Soái

Xu Deshuai (Chinese: 徐德帥; pinyin: Xú Déshuài; born 13 July 1987) is a former professional footballer who played as a winger. Born in China, he represented Hong Kong on the international level. He was a member of the Hong Kong East Asian Games football team in 2009 who won the East Asian Games gold medal.

Xu wears number 8 for China U-19, Citizen, Hong Kong, Hong Kong U-23, South China and Pegasus. Because of this, Hong Kong football fans commonly use Xu 8 as a nickname for him.

== Early life ==
Xu was born on 13 July 1987 in Dalian, China. He is the only child in his family. His mother was a primary school teacher but Xu hated to study. Thus, he left school after secondary education in Dalian to switch to Dalian Shide's youth academy under his mother's oppositional idea. His mother abandoned interference after the school teacher had told her that Xu has potential in football, so her mother support his football career very much after that.

== Club career ==
=== Dalian Shide ===
Xu began his football career at Dalian with Dalian Shide's youth academy. His potential was quickly identified by the First team in 2004. For Xu's first senior season in China, he was only named in the substitutes list for two matches and made no appearances. The two games he was listed on the substitutes list were in November 2004; the match against Shanghai Shenhua on 11 November, and against Tianjin Teda on 24 November. He was sent to the field in the match, which held on 11 November, on the 91st-minute. He came off the bench at the last moment of the game so the report did not show that.

Since Dalian Shide and Citizen organised a project, Dalian Shide sent some youth players to Citizen. In 2005, Xu was sent to Hong Kong, with other teammates such as Chao Pengfei and Ju Yingzhi.

He was called up by Dalian Shide U19 for the 2006 China U19 Champions Cup, and the team won the championship. After the tournament, he returned to Hong Kong side Citizen again with Wang Xuanhong.

=== Citizen ===
Xu made his debut in Hong Kong in the 2005–06 season. His first domestic league match was on 15 October against Kitchee. He came on in the 71st-minute as a substitute for So Yiu Man in a 3–0 away defeat. He expressed disappointment about always being used as a substitute. He went back to Dalian over the summer where he made five appearances.

In the 2007–08 season, Xu established himself as a regular first-team player, making 15 appearances in 18 league matches. He helped Citizen to win the 2007–08 Hong Kong FA Cup; during which he appeared in every game. This was the first top-level domestic cup won by Citizen since the club's founding in 1947. This earned him an official transfer to Citizen in the summer of 2008.

Xu was appointed as one of the vice-captains of Citizen in 2008. He started two matches as captain in the 2008–09 season. Xu scored both his first and second senior career goal in the match against Hong Kong Sheffield United on 2 May 2009. He finished the season with 7 goals in 23 matches. He was named 2009 Hong Kong Top Footballers of the Year.

Despite many transfer rumours regarding Xu in the winter of 2009, Citizen football department director Pui Ho Wang said that Xu is a "not-for-sale item" at the club.

In a Senior Shield match on Boxing Day in 2009, Xu and Fung Kai Hong verbally abused the referee Gary Wong Po On after a controversial decision. He was subsequently banned for four club matches from 12 January 2010. Xu returned in the league match against Sun Hei on 12 March 2010, coming on as a substitute at the 64th-minute for Citizen teammate Wong Yiu Fu and scored a goal during second half injury time.

Xu was named Hong Kong Top Footballers of the Year again after the 2009–10 season. In the ceremony, chairman of South China Steven Lo said Xu became a member of his team in the 2010–11 season.

=== South China ===
==== 2010–11 ====
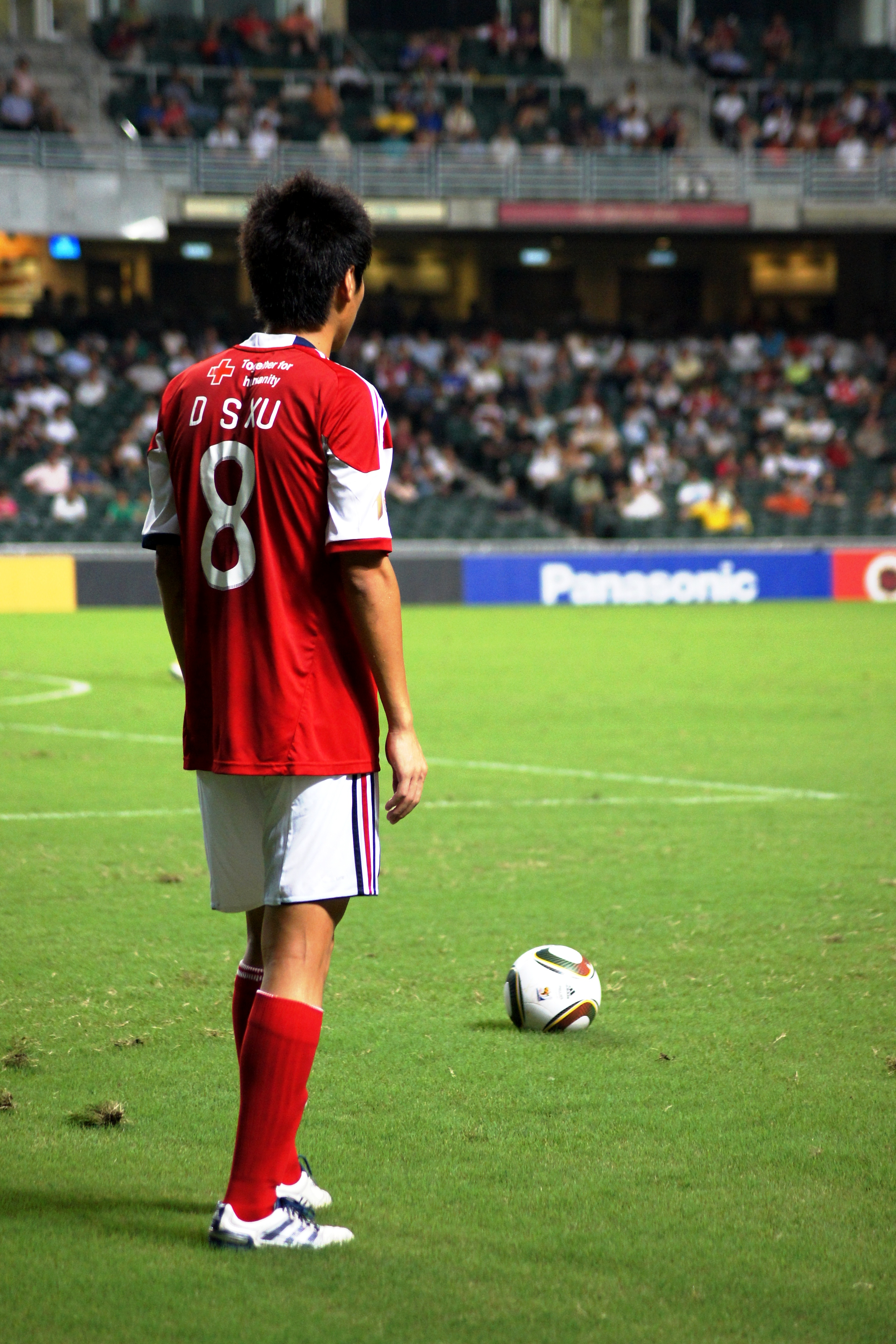
Xu in a match against Sun Hei on 18 September 2010

Xu signed with South China on 1 June 2010 since he believed it is a suitable time for him to start a new career in a big club like South China at 22 years of age. He want to get more honours in South China and he takes the AFC Cup as his first target in club. His first official match for South China was a league match on 4 September 2010. Xu was the starting player in the game as South China inflicted a 2–0 defeat over his former club Citizen.

The league match against Sun Hei on 18 September 2010 is the 100th official match of Xu's career. In the match, he took a corner kick which was converted into the first goal by Chan Siu Ki. In the end, South China defeated Sun Hei by 2–1 and moved to the top of league table.

After the 2010 Asian Games, Xu returned to the club but he played in a new role deep-lying playmaker to spare the right-winger position for Lee Wai Lim. In the league match against Kitchee on 11 December 2010, Xu was sent off for a challenge on Jordi Tarrés. South China lost the game by 3–4 and suffered its first defeat of the 2010–11 season. Xu was blamed by the fans after the match.

2010–11 Hong Kong Senior Challenge Shield semi-final matches held at Christmas in 2010 and one of two is the first game of Xu after suspension. He was the starting player of the team in the semi-final match against Sun Hei. He delivered a corner to Bai He at 51 minutes and Bai He headed in the goal. South China advanced to the final after the 3–0 victory.

In a League Cup quarter-final match on 9 January 2011, Xu scored in the 10th minute by a pass from Lau Nim Yat. Unluckily, Xu was injured and substituted at the 42-minute. So, he missed the final of Senior Challenge Shield. Furthermore, South China lost the final by penalty shootout to his former club Citizen.

Two months later, Xu made his league debut after injury on 31 March in a 3–1 defeat to former club Citizen. In the match, Xu scored at the 78-minute after coming on as a substitute just 7 minutes before. Caretaker coach of South China Chan Ho Yin said Xu's recovery could raise the competitiveness of the team and it was a piece of good news before Hong Kong derby. However, South China lost the derby by 2 goals on 3 April even though Xu came on the field at the 32-minute.

South China has won League Cup and FA Cup in the season, but failed in 2012 AFC Cup qualifying. Xu played over 800 minutes in league match, less than last season in Citizen, and scored 4 goals.

==== 2011–12 ====
New coach Ján Kocian appointed Xu as a box-to-box midfielder and played as one of playmakers with captain Li Haiqiang but he could not have a good performance. After a downturn of South China, Xu returned to play as a right winger and he scored in the shield match which defeated Sham Shui Po. Ironically, Xu had a mistake which cause Fong Pak Lun scored at the 78-minute in this game. In a league game against Tai Po on 3 December 2011, Xu scored by an assist made by Chan Siu Ki and made an assist for Chan Siu Ki. It led South China to win the game by 3 goals.

In Lunar New Year, South China held a friendly four-team mid-season tournament 2012 Asian Challenge Cup and Xu played both the semi-final and third-place match in the event. However, South China got the fourth place.

In the following days of the season, South China was eliminated in 2011–12 Hong Kong League Cup and 2011–12 Hong Kong FA Cup, also by Kitchee. For the 2011–12 Hong Kong First Division League, Xu finished his second season with South China as 3rd place in the league and failed in 2013 AFC Cup qualifying again. As the result, Xu left from South China after the season.

=== Pegasus ===
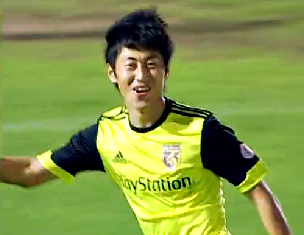
Xu playing for Pegasus

TSW Pegasus reformed after the 2011–12 season and was renamed as Sun Pegasus. Xu had agreed terms with the Pegasus for his transfer and the coach Chan Chi Hong claimed that Xu would be a leader of the team even though he is just a young player.

In the team, Xu had more opportunities in his habitual position, the right midfield, so his performance became better much. However, Pegasus ranked the 8th in the league table of the first division after week 9, the mid of the season. Xu scored the 1–1 equaliser in a league match against Southern on 19 January 2013 and earned a valuable point in their race to once again escape from First Division League relegation. Pegasus made consecutive games undefeated after this match.

Before the New Territories derby in FA Cup against Tai Po, some media in Hong Kong believe Xu would be the Pegasus's key to winning the match. As expected, Xu scored the only goal in the 77th minute of the 1st leg FA Cup match. Pegasus finally beat Tai Po and advanced to the final of the FA Cup.

=== Kitchee ===
Xu joined Kitchee from fellow First Division club Pegasus for an undisclosed fee on 30 May 2013, since Kitchee qualified for 2013 AFC Cup quarter-finals and the team would strengthen their squad with local player.

=== Eastern ===
Xu joined Eastern in the summer of 2015.

On 1 June 2020, Xu left when his contract expired with the club and subsequently he retired from professional football.

== International career ==
=== China U-19 ===
Jia Xiuquan was appointed as head coach of China's national youth football team for preparing 2008 Olympic Games and he started his planning after 2005 FIFA World Youth Championship. He selected Xu for the training section for a four-nation mini-tournament Grand Royal Challenge Cup in Burma in 2005. However, he did not go to Burma for the tournament.

Xu was called up by the China national under-19 football team between 11 and 15 April 2006 for a four-nation mini-tournament 24th Torneio International do Porto in Portugal. He scored a goal in the match against Portugal.

Xu also was called up to China's U-19 squad for the game against Japan's U-20 national team on 26 April 2006, but he did not enter the match.

=== Hong Kong ===
==== 2008–09 ====
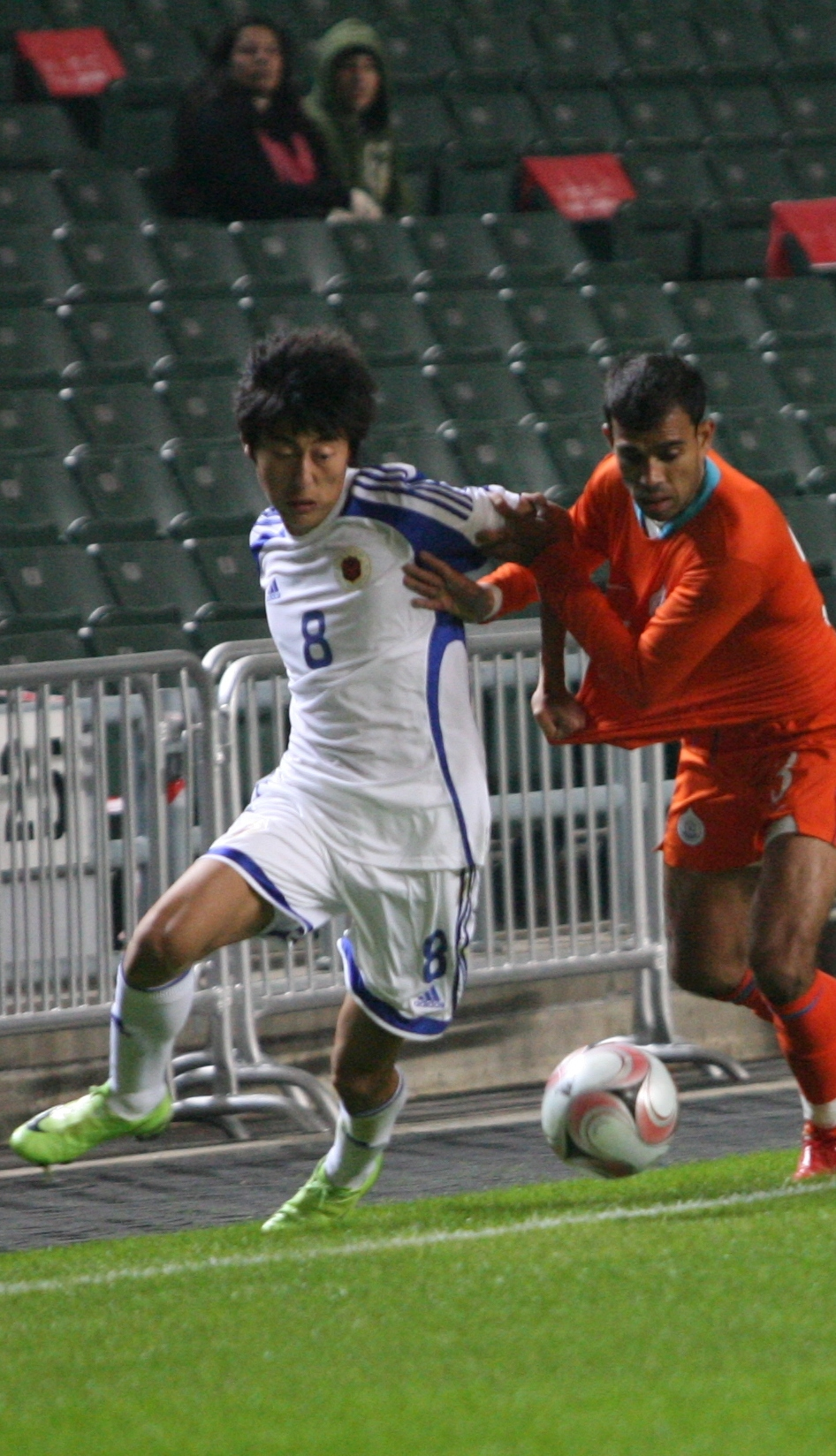
Xu (white) and Samir Naik (orange) in friendly Hong Kong against India in 2009

Although Xu was born in Mainland China, he played in Hong Kong continuously for two years he is eligible for the Hong Kong national football team. He was selected by Goran Paulić and Dejan Antonić for the Hong Kong team at the end of 2008, to prepare for 2011 AFC Asian Cup qualification. His international debut for Hong Kong was a friendly against Macau where Hong Kong achieved a 9–1 win.

He starred in the 2009 Guangdong–Hong Kong Cup, scoring his first goal for Hong Kong by a direct free kick to help Hong Kong secure a 4–1 victory at home and a 5–4 aggregate win over the Guangdong representative team.

Xu missed the 2010 East Asian Football Championship semi-final competition because new Hong Kong head coach Kim Pan-Gon, manager of South China selected only South China players at the Hong Kong Football Association's invitation. This aroused discontent by Hong Kong supporters but did not result in any change in the composition of the squad.

==== 2009–10 ====
Kim Pan-Gon selected Xu for two AFC Asian Cup qualifying matches against Japan in October and November 2009. However, he did not appear in either match and Hong Kong lost by 10 goals to zero in these two matches. In January 2010, he missed the AFC Asian Cup qualifying matches again due to his Chinese passport requiring a visa to enter Bahrain immigration. Hong Kong lost the game against Bahrain by 4 goals.

Xu was selected by Yan Lik Kin for the 2010 Guangdong–Hong Kong Cup. Xu's corner kick assisted Julius Akosah to score the first goal in the first leg. Hong Kong won the first leg 2:1. In the second leg Hong Kong experienced difficulty with Xu missing the match due to illness and Akosah being sent off with a red card during the match. Hong Kong subsequently lost the match 0:2.

Xu was also a member of the Hong Kong squad for the 2010 East Asian Football Championship final competition because of his performance in the 2009 East Asian Games. Nevertheless, Xu didn't start in the first game against South Korea and came on to the field on the 85th-minute after Hong Kong had already given up four goals. He played in the starting line-up in the second game against Japan. Xu hit a dangerous-looking direct free kick caught by Seigo Narazaki in second half. Hong Kong also lost by 3 goals. He wasted a scoring opportunity during first half of the game against China.

==== 2010–11 ====
Hong Kong team had recondition before 2010–11 season and Hong Kong coach Tsang Wai Chung selected Xu for the training session. He missed friendly against India since was selected for 2010 Long Teng Cup in Kaohsiung, Taiwan.

The Hong Kong Football Association entered the Hong Kong team in the Long Teng Cup organised by Chinese Taipei Football Association to prepare for the Asian Games. Xu was selected as a member of the squad. The first match for Hong Kong was against Philippines national football team, but heavy rain caused the game to be abandoned. Xu scored the second goal of the match in the re-match played on 9 October 2010. He scored a goal again in the next game against Macau national football team on 10 October 2010. He also played in the last match of the tournament and Hong Kong drew with Chinese Taipei national football team. Hong Kong became the first winner of the Long Teng Cup.

At the end of the season, Xu was recalled for the friendly against Malaysia in Siu Sai Wan Sports Ground, but he left the team due to injury.

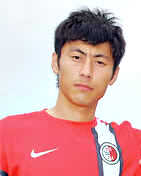
Xu playing for Hong Kong national football team in 2013

==== 2011–12 ====
After a year of leave, Xu went back to the Hong Kong team for 2012 Guangdong-Hong Kong Cup. He was a start-up player in the 1st leg game on 28 December 2011 but he was tightly marked by Cantonese and did not make any score or assist. Caretaker coach Liu Chun Fai let fast-speed Jaimes McKee take the place of Xu in the 2nd leg. In the match, anything cannot be changed and Hong Kong still drew with Guangdong team. Xu came off the bench in the 61st minute and Hong Kong won by penalty shoot-out.

Having stepped down as a South China player in this season, Xu was dropped completely from the Hong Kong national team and selected by new coach Ernie Merrick. Merrick claimed that he was looking to go in a different direction with the team, although Merrick eventually opted to employ striker Jaimes McKee on the right side.

==== 2012–13 ====
On 16 March 2013, Kim Pan-Gon announced that Xu would be recalled to the Hong Kong squad for the 2015 AFC Asian Cup qualification against Vietnam. In the match, Xu was sent to the patch in the 58th minute. He made some cross passes and long-range shots during the game but did not create any change and Hong Kong won the Vietnam team by one goal.

In the Hong Kong team training session before friendly match against Philippines on 7 June 2013, Kim Pan-Gon explained the wedding of Xu was the reason that Xu was not in the squad, and he would be an important member of Hong Kong team in Asian Cup qualification.

=== Hong Kong U-23 ===
==== 2009 East Asian Games ====
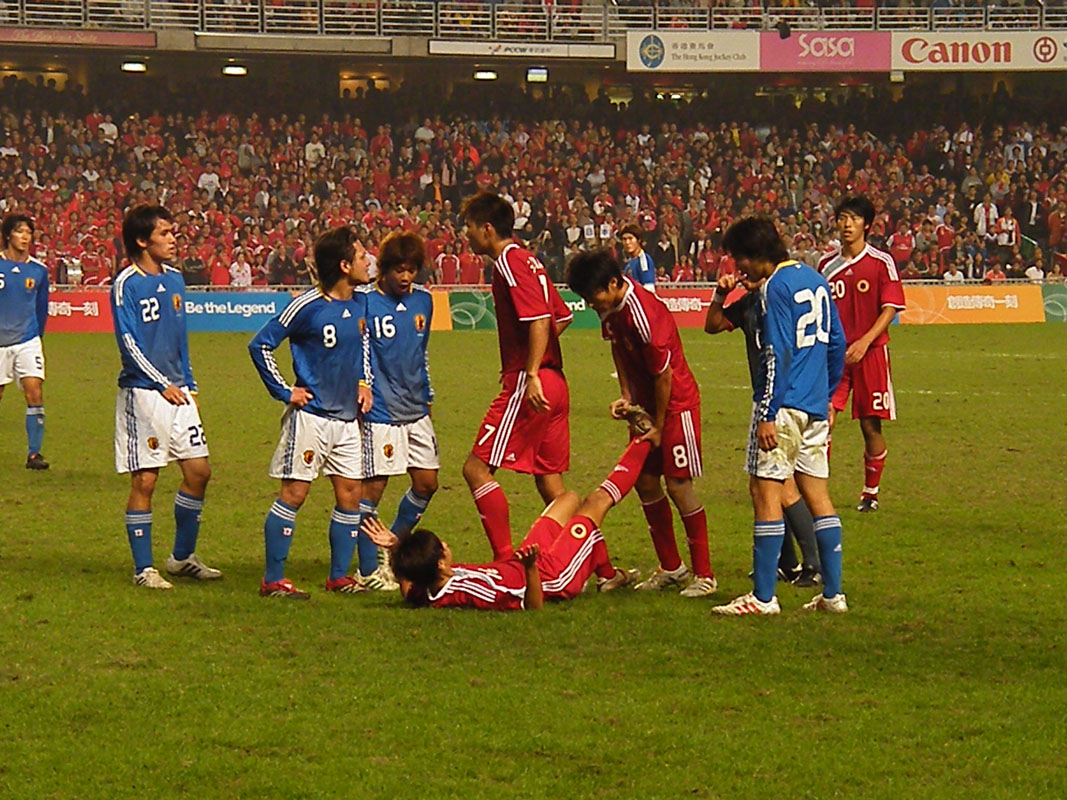
Xu (No.8 with Red shirt) laced Leung Chun Pong in the Gold medal match of the football tournament at the 2009 East Asian Games

Since Xu was 22 years old in 2009, Hong Kong East Asian Games football team coach Kim Pan-Gon selected him for the 2009 East Asian Games. On 4 December 2009, he scored a goal to cap a historic 4–1 victory over Korea Republic. He had a wonderful performance in the semi-final match against Korea DPR on 10 December. In the final, Xu made an assist for Chan Siu Ki to score in the second half. The goal gave the team a 1–1 draw and subsequently Hong Kong defeated Japan 4–2 in a penalty shootout. The tournament was won by Hong Kong, who claimed their first international football tournament title.

==== 2010 Asian Games ====
In September 2010, Hong Kong Asian Games football team was formed by Tsang Wai Chung for 2010 Asian Games. Xu was one of the members of the last 20 players for the Asian Games. He played all the 90 minutes in the first game of the tournament drew with United Arab Emirates on 7 November 2010. In the second game won Uzbekistan on 9 November, Xu had highest number of shoots of the Hong Kong and made the corner before winning goal. He made an assist for Au Yeung Yiu Chung in first half of the last group stage match against Bangladesh on 11 November 2010. Bangladesh lose the game by 4–1 and Hong Kong advanced to the knockout stage. This is the first time that Hong Kong qualified to the knockout stage in 52 years.

Hong Kong national football team were invited by Olympic Committee of Hong Kong to stand for Hong Kong in boat parade event named Setting Sail in opening ceremony. Coach Tsang selected captain Chan Wai Ho, vice-captain Lee Chi Ho, Xu and other 5 members to the boat. Nevertheless, Hong Kong was losing by 3–0 to Oman later and failed to reach the quarter-finals. Hong Kong team changed the form from defensive to offensive but right-winger Xu and left-winger Chan Man Fai were marked successfully by Omani in the match.

== Honours ==
=== Club ===
Dalian Shide

- Chinese Super League: 2005

Citizen

- Hong Kong FA Cup: 2007–08

South China

- Hong Kong League Cup: 2010–11
- Hong Kong FA Cup: 2010–11

Kitchee

- Hong Kong First Division: 2013–14, 2014–15
- Hong Kong FA Cup: 2014–15

Eastern

- Hong Kong Premier League: 2015–16
- Hong Kong Senior Shield: 2015–16

=== International ===
Hong Kong

- Guangdong-Hong Kong Cup: 2009, 2012

Hong Kong U-23

- East Asian Games: 2009
- Long Teng Cup: 2010

=== Individual ===
- Hong Kong Top Footballers: 2008–09, 2009–10

== Career statistics ==
=== Club ===
As of 8 December 2014

Club performance			League		Cup		League Cup		Continental		Total	
Season	Club	League	Apps	Goals	Apps	Goals	Apps	Goals	Apps	Goals	Apps	Goals
China PR			League		FA Cup		CSL Cup		Asia		Total	
2004	Dalian Shide	Super League	0	0	0	0	0	0	0	0	0	0
2005	Dalian Shide	Super League	0	0	0	0	0	0	-		0	0
Hong Kong			League		FA Cup & Shield		LC & Play-off		Asia		Total	
2005–06	Citizen	First Division	5	0	1	0	4	0	-		10	0
2006–07	Citizen	First Division	11	0	2	0	4	0	-		17	0
2007–08	Citizen	First Division	15	0	5	0	3	0	-		23	0
2008–09	Citizen	First Division	22	5	3	2	3	0	-		28	7
2009–10	Citizen	First Division	15	3	5	0	-		-		20	3
2010–11	South China	First Division	12	1	3	1	2	1	4	1	21	4
2011–12	South China	First Division	14	3	3	1	2	0	-		19	4
2012–13	Pegasus	First Division	17	2	6	1	-		-		23	3
2013–14	Kitchee	First Division	9	0	0	0	-		7	1	16	1
2014–15	Kitchee	Premier League	8	5	1	0	1	0	5	2	15	7
Total	China PR		0	0	0	0	0	0	0	0	0	0
Total	Hong Kong		128	19	29	5	19	1	16	4	192	29
Career total			128	19	29	5	19	1	16	4	192	29

=== International ===
==== China U-19 ====
As of 15 April 2006

China U-19 appearances and goals
#	Date	Venue	Opponent	Result	Scored	Competition
2006
1	12 April 2006	Estádio do Rio Ave, Vila do Conde, Portugal	Portugal	1–5	1	24th Torneio International do Porto
2	13 April 2006	Complexo Desportivo de Azevido, Rebordosa, Portugal	Canada	0–0	0	24th Torneio International do Porto
3	15 April 2006	Estádio do Leça FC, Leça da Palmeira, Portugal	Norway	1–2	0	24th Torneio International do Porto

==== Hong Kong U-23 ====
As of 15 November 2010

Hong Kong U-23 appearances and goals
#	Date	Venue	Opponent	Result	Scored	Competition
2009–10
1	4 December 2009	Siu Sai Wan Sports Ground, Hong Kong	South Korea	4–1	1	2009 East Asian Games
2	8 December 2009	Siu Sai Wan Sports Ground, Hong Kong	China	0–1	0	2009 East Asian Games
3	10 December 2009	Hong Kong Stadium, Hong Kong	North Korea	1–1 (4–2 PSO)	0	2009 East Asian Games
4	12 December 2009	Hong Kong Stadium, Hong Kong	Japan	1–1 (4–2 PSO)	0	2009 East Asian Games
2010–11
5	7 November 2010	Huadu Stadium, Guangzhou, China	United Arab Emirates	1–1	0	2010 Asian Games
6	9 November 2010	Huadu Stadium, Guangzhou, China	Uzbekistan	1–0	0	2010 Asian Games
7	11 November 2010	Huadu Stadium, Guangzhou, China	Bangladesh	4–1	0	2010 Asian Games
8	15 November 2010	Huangpu Sports Center, Guangzhou, China	Oman	0–3	0	2010 Asian Games

==== Hong Kong ====
As of 19 November 2014

Hong Kong appearances and goals
#	Date	Venue	Opponent	Result	Scored	Competition
2008–09
1	19 November 2008	Macau UST Stadium, Macau	Macau	9–1	0	Friendly
	1 January 2009	Yuexiushan Stadium, Guangzhou, China	Guangdong	1–3	0	2009 Guangdong–Hong Kong Cup
	4 January 2009	Mong Kok Stadium, Hong Kong	Guangdong	4–1	1	2009 Guangdong–Hong Kong Cup
2	14 January 2009	Hong Kong Stadium, Hong Kong	India	2–1	0	Friendly
3	21 January 2009	Hong Kong Stadium, Hong Kong	Bahrain	1–3	0	2011 AFC Asian Cup qualification
4	28 January 2009	Ali Muhesen Stadium, Sana'a, Yemen	Yemen	0–1	0	2011 AFC Asian Cup qualification
2009–10
	29 December 2009	Siu Sai Wan Sports Ground, Hong Kong	Guangdong	2–1	0	2010 Guangdong–Hong Kong Cup
	2 January 2010	Zhaoqing Sports Center, Zhaoqing, China	Guangdong	0–2	0	2010 Guangdong–Hong Kong Cup
5	7 February 2010	Olympic Stadium, Tokyo, Japan	South Korea	0–5	0	2010 East Asian Football Championship
6	11 February 2010	Olympic Stadium, Tokyo, Japan	Japan	0–3	0	2010 East Asian Football Championship
7	14 February 2010	Olympic Stadium, Tokyo, Japan	China	0–2	0	2010 East Asian Football Championship
8	3 March 2010	Hong Kong Stadium, Hong Kong	Yemen	0–0	0	2011 AFC Asian Cup qualification
2010–11
9	9 October 2010	Kaohsiung National Stadium, Kaohsiung, Taiwan	Philippines	4–2	1	2010 Long Teng Cup
10	10 October 2010	Kaohsiung National Stadium, Kaohsiung, Taiwan	Macau	4–0	1	2010 Long Teng Cup
11	12 October 2010	Kaohsiung National Stadium, Kaohsiung, Taiwan	Chinese Taipei	1–1	0	2010 Long Teng Cup
2011–12
	28 December 2011	Hong Kong Stadium, Hong Kong	Guangdong	2–2	0	2012 Guangdong-Hong Kong Cup
	1 January 2012	Huizhou Olympic Stadium, Huizhou, China	Guangdong	0–0 (5–4 PSO)	0	2012 Guangdong-Hong Kong Cup
2012–13
12	22 March 2013	Mong Kok Stadium, Mong Kok, Hong Kong	Vietnam	1–0	0	2015 AFC Asian Cup qualification
2014–15
14	10 October 2014	Mong Kok Stadium, Mong Kok, Hong Kong	Singapore	2–1	1	Friendly
15	14 October 2014	Hong Kong Stadium, Hong Kong	Argentina	0–7	0	Friendly
16	11 November 2014	Taipei Municipal Stadium, Taipei, Taiwan	North Korea	1–2	0	2015 EAFF East Asian Cup Preliminary
17	16 November 2014	Taipei Municipal Stadium, Taipei, Taiwan	Chinese Taipei	1–0	0	2015 EAFF East Asian Cup Preliminary
18	19 November 2014	Taipei Municipal Stadium, Taipei, Taiwan	Guam	0–0	0	2015 EAFF East Asian Cup Preliminary
	31 December 2014	Huizhou Olympic Stadium, Huizhou, China	Guangdong	0–1	0	2015 Guangdong–Hong Kong Cup
	4 January 2015	Mong Kok Stadium, Mong Kok, Hong Kong	Guangdong	0–0	0	2015 Guangdong–Hong Kong Cup

As of 10 October 2019

National team	Year	Apps	Goals
Hong Kong	2008	1	0
Hong Kong	2009	3	0
Hong Kong	2010	7	2
Hong Kong	2011	0	0
Hong Kong	2012	0	0
Hong Kong	2013	1	0
Hong Kong	2014	5	1
Hong Kong	2015	8	1
Hong Kong	2016	4	0
Hong Kong	2017	4	0
Hong Kong	2018	5	0
Hong Kong	2019	1	0
Total		39	4

== Personal life ==
Xu met his wife in Dalian and their wedding was held in June 2013. She was a student of the Hong Kong Institute of Education when he was playing for Citizen and South China. Mahjong is the most interest of Xu. Xu's parents live in Dalian. He lived in Wan Chai on Hong Kong Island with Chao Pengfei and Ju Yingzhi before he started playing for South China. He always played Mahjong with his friends after they came to Hong Kong. Xu lived with his wife in Kowloon since he played for South China.

Xu cannot speak either Cantonese or English and he can only speak in Putonghua. For this, he said it is not a problem in Hong Kong because most of Hong Kong people understand Putonghua and his teammates translate Putonghua to English for his coaches, such as Kim Pan-Gon. He said that he loves Hong Kong for its good surroundings and for allowing him to play football.
