= 37th Guangdong–Hong Kong Cup =

37th Guangdong-Hong Kong Cup
- Event: Guangdong-Hong Kong Cup
Guangdong	Hong Kong
1	0

First leg
Guangdong	Hong Kong
1	0
- Date: 31 December 2014
- Venue: Huizhou Olympic Stadium, Huizhou, Guangdong

Second leg
Hong Kong	Guangdong
0	0
- 3,779
- Date: 4 January 2015
- Venue: Mong Kok Stadium, Mong Kok
- Referee: Luk Kin Sun (Hong Kong)

The 37th Guangdong-Hong Kong Cup was held on 31 December 2014 and 4 January 2015. Guangdong won by an aggregate 1–0.

== Squads ==
=== Guangdong ===
- Head Coach: (China) Chen Yuliang

No.	Pos.	Player	Date of birth (age)	Caps	Club
1	GK	Fang Jingqi	17 January 1993 (aged 21)		(China) Guangzhou Evergrande
3	DF	Guan Haojin	26 August 1995 (aged 19)		(China) Guangzhou Evergrande
4	DF	Guo Zichao	25 January 1989 (aged 25)		(China) Guangdong Sunray Cave
5	DF	Tu Dongxu	13 November 1991 (aged 23)		(China) Guangzhou Evergrande
6	DF	Liao Junjian	27 January 1994 (aged 20)		(China) Guangdong Sunray Cave
7	MF	Feng Junyan	18 February 1984 (aged 30)		(China) Guangzhou Evergrande
8	MF	Wu Weian	1 September 1981 (aged 33)		(China) Guangzhou R&F
10	FW	Yang Chaosheng	22 July 1993 (aged 21)		(China) Liaoning Whowin
11	FW	Liang Xueming	2 August 1995 (aged 19)		(China) Guangzhou Evergrande
12	MF	Shi Hongjun	4 October 1991 (aged 23)		(China) Meizhou Kejia
14	DF	Li Jianhua	12 February 1982 (aged 32)		(China) Guangzhou R&F
15	FW	Ni Bo	4 May 1989 (aged 25)		(China) Guangzhou Evergrande
17	MF	Li Zhilang	22 August 1991 (aged 23)		(China) Meizhou Kejia
18	MF	Huang Haoxuan	15 January 1994 (aged 20)		(China) Guangdong Sunray Cave
22	GK	Ye Guochen	10 September 1996 (aged 18)		(China) Guangzhou Evergrande
23	MF	Lu Lin	3 February 1985 (aged 29)		(China) Guangzhou R&F
26	MF	Wu Pingfeng	1 November 1981 (aged 33)		(China) Guangzhou R&F
27	FW	Ye Weichao	18 February 1989 (aged 25)		(China) Guangzhou Evergrande
29	MF	Hu Weiwei	3 March 1993 (aged 21)		(China) Guangzhou Evergrande
30	GK	Liang Hua	2 March 1993 (aged 21)		(China) Guangdong Sunray Cave

=== Hong Kong ===
- Head Coach: (South Korea) Kim Pan-gon

No.	Pos.	Player	Date of birth (age)	Caps	Club
1	GK	Yapp Hung Fai	21 March 1990 (aged 24)		(Hong Kong) Eastern
2	DF	Che Runqiu	23 October 1990 (aged 24)		(Hong Kong) South China
3	DF	Chan Hin Kwong	27 February 1988 (aged 26)		(Hong Kong) I-Sky Yuen Long
4	DF	Leung Nok Hang	14 November 1994 (aged 20)		(Hong Kong) YFCMD
5	DF	Tsang Chi Hau	12 January 1990 (aged 24)		(Hong Kong) Kitchee
6	DF	Leung Ka Hai	12 April 1993 (aged 21)		(Hong Kong) Kitchee
8	MF	Xu Deshuai	13 July 1987 (aged 27)		(Hong Kong) Kitchee
11	FW	Lam Hok Hei	18 September 1991 (aged 23)		(Hong Kong) Biu Chun Rangers
12	MF	Chan Siu Kwan	1 August 1992 (aged 22)		(Hong Kong) South China
14	DF	Jack Sealy	4 May 1987 (aged 27)		(Hong Kong) South China
15	DF	Cheung Chi Yung	10 June 1989 (aged 25)		(Hong Kong) I-Sky Yuen Long
18	FW	Chuck Yiu Kwok	29 May 1994 (aged 20)		(Hong Kong) Biu Chun Rangers
19	GK	Wang Zhenpeng	5 May 1984 (aged 30)		(Hong Kong) Kitchee
20	MF	Lo Kong Wai	19 June 1992 (aged 22)		(Hong Kong) South China
21	DF	Kwok Kin Pong	30 March 1987 (aged 27)		(Hong Kong) South China
22	FW	Jaimes McKee	14 April 1987 (aged 27)		(Hong Kong) Sun Pegasus
23	MF	Ju Yingzhi	24 July 1987 (aged 27)		(Hong Kong) Sun Pegasus
25	MF	Wong Wai	17 September 1992 (aged 22)		(Hong Kong) YFCMD
26	DF	Leung Kwun Chung	1 April 1992 (aged 22)		(Hong Kong) YFCMD

== Match details ==
=== First leg ===
31 December 2014	Guangdong	1 – 0	Hong Kong	Huizhou, Guangdong
15:00(GMT+8)	Lu Lin 69'	Report		Stadium: Huizhou Olympic Stadium

HOME TEAM:
GK	1	(China) Fang Jingqi
RB	14	(China) Li Jianhua
CB	5	(China) Tu Dongxu
CB	6	(China) Liao Junjian
LB	4	(China) Guo Zichao
DM	7	(China) Feng Junyan		(substituted off) 76'
DM	17	(China) Li Zhilang		(substituted off) 46'
AM	8	(China) Wu Weian
LW	23	(China) Lu Lin (C)	(yellow card) 38'
RW	29	(China) Hu Weiwei		(substituted off) 60'
ST	28	(China) Ye Weichao		(substituted off) 63'
Substitutes:
DF	3	(China) Guan Haojin
FW	10	(China) Yang Chaosheng
FW	11	(China) Liang Xueming		(substituted on) 60' (substituted off) 86'
MF	12	(China) Shi Hongjun		(substituted on) 63'
FW	15	(China) Ni Bo		(substituted on) 76'
MF	18	(China) Huang Haoxuan		(substituted on) 46'
GK	22	(China) Ye Guochen
MF	26	(China) Wu Pingfeng		(substituted on) 86'
GK	30	(China) Liang Hua
Coach:
(China) Chen Yuliang

AWAY TEAM:
GK	1	(Hong Kong) Yapp Hung Fai (C)
RB	14	(Hong Kong) Jack Sealy
CB	5	(Hong Kong) Tsang Chi Hau
CB	15	(Hong Kong) Cheung Chi Yung
LB	21	(Hong Kong) Kwok Kin Pong
DM	12	(Hong Kong) Chan Siu Kwan
CM	25	(Hong Kong) Wong Wai
AM	23	(Hong Kong) Ju Yingzhi	(yellow card) 38'	(substituted off) 78'
RW	8	(Hong Kong) Xu Deshuai
LW	22	(Hong Kong) Jaimes McKee
ST	11	(Hong Kong) Lam Hok Hei		(substituted off) 46'
Substitutes:
DF	2	(Hong Kong) Che Runqiu
DF	3	(Hong Kong) Chan Hin Kwong
DF	4	(Hong Kong) Leung Nok Hang
DF	6	(Hong Kong) Leung Ka Hai
FW	18	(Hong Kong) Chuck Yiu Kwok		(substituted on) 78'
GK	19	(Hong Kong) Wang Zhenpeng
MF	20	(Hong Kong) Lo Kong Wai		(substituted on) 46'
DF	26	(Hong Kong) Leung Kwun Chung
Coach:
(South Korea) Kim Pan-Gon

=== Second leg ===
4 January 2015	Hong Kong	0 – 0	Guangdong	Mong Kok, Kowloon
15:00(GMT+8)		Report		Stadium: Mong Kok Stadium; Attendance: 3,779; Referee: Luk Kin Sun (Hong Kong)

HOME TEAM:
GK	19	(Hong Kong) Wang Zhenpeng
RB	14	(Hong Kong) Jack Sealy		(substituted off) 16'
CB	4	(Hong Kong) Leung Nok Hang
CB	5	(Hong Kong) Tsang Chi Hau
LB	21	(Hong Kong) Kwok Kin Pong (C)
DM	12	(Hong Kong) Chan Siu Kwan	(yellow card) 71'
CM	25	(Hong Kong) Wong Wai		(substituted off) 33'
AM	23	(Hong Kong) Ju Yingzhi	(yellow card) 66'	(substituted off) 79'
RW	8	(Hong Kong) Xu Deshuai
LW	20	(Hong Kong) Lo Kong Wai
ST	22	(Hong Kong) Jaimes McKee		(substituted off) 88'
Substitutes:
GK	1	(Hong Kong) Yapp Hung Fai
DF	2	(Hong Kong) Che Runqiu
DF	3	(Hong Kong) Chan Hin Kwong		(substituted on) 33'
DF	6	(Hong Kong) Leung Ka Hai	(yellow card) 89'	(substituted on) 79'
FW	11	(Hong Kong) Lam Hok Hei		(substituted on) 16'
DF	15	(Hong Kong) Cheung Chi Yung
FW	18	(Hong Kong) Chuck Yiu Kwok		(substituted on) 88'
DF	26	(Hong Kong) Leung Kwun Chung
Coach:
(South Korea) Kim Pan-Gon

AWAY TEAM:
GK	1	(China) Fang Jingqi
RB	14	(China) Li Jianhua
CB	5	(China) Tu Dongxu
CB	6	(China) Liao Junjian
LB	4	(China) Guo Zichao
DM	7	(China) Feng Junyan	(yellow card) 89'
DM	17	(China) Li Zhilang		(substituted off) 55' ^{3}
AM	8	(China) Wu Weian
LW	23	(China) Lu Lin (C)	(yellow card) 29'
RW	29	(China) Hu Weiwei		(substituted off) 55' ^{2}
ST	28	(China) Ye Weichao		(substituted off) 55' ^{1}
Substitutes:
DF	3	(China) Guan Haojin
FW	10	(China) Yang Chaosheng	(yellow card) 82'	(substituted on) 55' ^{1}
FW	11	(China) Liang Xueming		(substituted on) 55' ^{3} (substituted off) 83'
MF	12	(China) Shi Hongjun		(substituted on) 83'
FW	15	(China) Ni Bo
MF	18	(China) Huang Haoxuan	(yellow card) 63'	(substituted on) 55' ^{2} (substituted off) 89'
GK	22	(China) Ye Guochen
MF	26	(China) Wu Pingfeng	(yellow card) 90+4'	(substituted on) 89'
GK	30	(China) Liang Hua
Coach:
(China) Chen Yuliang
