= Lee Wai Lim =

Hong Kong footballer (born 1981)

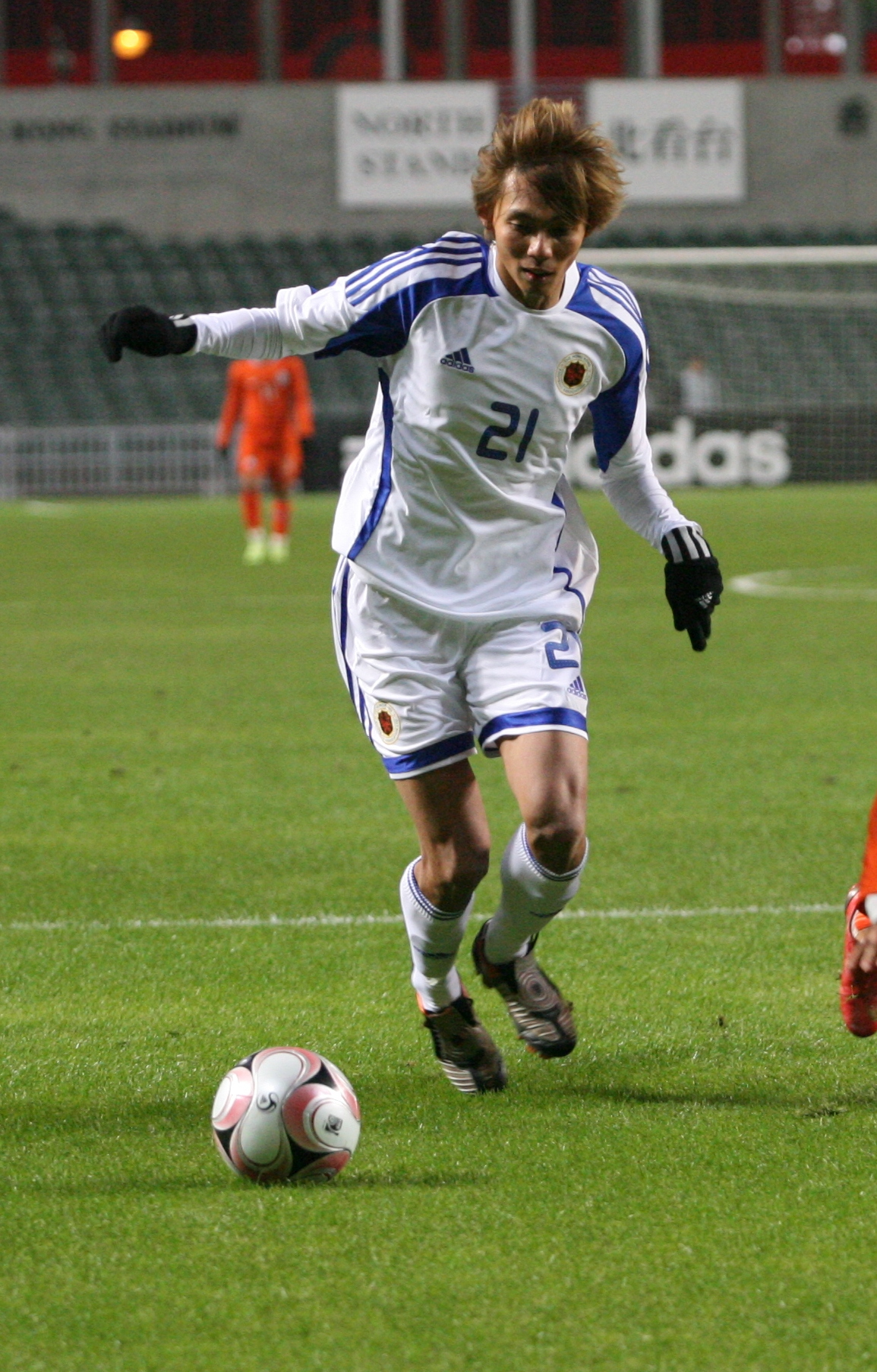

Personal information
- Full name: Lee Wai Lim
- Date of birth: 5 May 1981 (age 45)
- Place of birth: Sha Tau Kok, Hong Kong
- Height: 1.78 m (5 ft 10 in)
- Position: Midfielder

Senior career*
Years	Team	Apps	(Gls)
2003–2009	Tai Po	110	(31)
2009–2015	South China	74	(9)
2015–2016	Pegasus	0	(0)
2016–2017	Metro Gallery	6	(4)

International career
2008–2015	Hong Kong	30	(5)

Managerial career
- 2015–2016: Pegasus (assistant coach)
- * Club domestic league appearances and goals

Lee Wai Lim (Chinese: 李威廉; Jyutping: lei^{5} wai^{1} lim^{4}, born 5 May 1981) is a former Hong Kong professional footballer and coach. He is the brother of former professional footballer Lee Hong Lim.

A former Hong Kong Footballer of the Year winner in 2009, Lee pleaded guilty in 2018 to one count each of accepting an advantage and conspiracy to defraud. He was sentenced to 180 hours of community service for his crimes.

== Club career ==
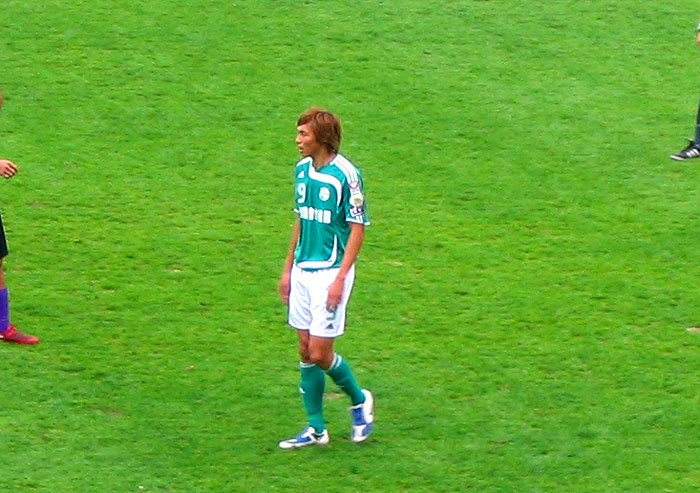
Lee Wai Lim played with Tai Po

=== Tai Po ===
Lee joined Tai Po in the third division in 2003 after being discovered by Tai Po's secretary Chan Ping. He stayed with the team as it progressed to the First Division in 2007 and turned professional. During his time as an amateur, he worked as a shopping mall security guard.

==== 2009 Hong Kong FA Cup ====
Lee scored the penalty against Fourway to take Tai Po to the final of the Hong Kong FA Cup.

In the final, Lee Wai Lim scored a free kick and helped Tai Po beat TSW Pegasus 4:2 and thus became the first district team to win the trophy. Lee Wai Lim also won the title of Man of the Match.

His last match for Tai Po FC was a friendly against his new employers South China on 13 June 2009 at Mong Kok Stadium. Tai Po lost the game. Lee Wai Lim scored a penalty which he won himself.

Lee was awarded Hong Kong Player of the Year award on 12 June 2009 and received a HK$45,000 prize.

=== South China ===
On the same date he won the Player of the Year prize, Lee Wai Lim confirmed that he would be joining South China in the season of 2009–10.

On 11 May 2010, in the 2010 AFC Cup second round match against Al Riffa, in the 28th minute, Lee Wai Lim passed to teammate Lee Chi Ho to score. But South China lost the game 1:3.

On 19 February 2011, Lee scored with a header in the 82-minute to help South China win the away game by 1:0 against Tuen Mun.

=== Pegasus ===
Lee joined Pegasus in the summer of 2015 as a player-coach.

== International career ==
He was selected by Goran Paulić and Dejan Antonić for the Hong Kong team at the end of 2008, to prepare for the 2011 AFC Asian Cup qualifiers. He scored a hattrick in his first game against Macau as Hong Kong achieved a 9–1 win.

He starred in the 2009 Guangdong-Hong Kong Cup, scoring one goal and providing two assists to help Hong Kong secure a 4–1 victory at home and a 5–4 aggregate win over Guangdong. His performance earned him the nickname Prince William from the fans.

On 30 September 2011, Lee Wai Lim scored the opening goal in the 3:3 draw with the Philippines in the 2011 Long Teng Cup.

== Bribery scandal ==
On 6 October 2016, Lee was one of six current and former Pegasus players to be taken in for questioning by the ICAC on allegations of match fixing. He was formally charged on 28 June 2017 for conspiring to fix several reserve league matches.

On 12 January 2018, Lee pleaded guilty to one count each of accepting an advantage and conspiracy to defraud. He was sentenced on 4 May 2018 to 180 hours of community service.

== Personal life ==
He is the elder brother of Lee Hong Lim, who used to be his teammate at Tai Po, until he moved in January 2009 to Pegasus.

== Career statistics ==
=== Club ===
As of 10 October 2012

Appearances and goals by club, season and competition
Club	Season	League		Senior Shield		League Cup		FA Cup		AFC Cup		Total	
Club	Season	Apps	Goals	Apps	Goals	Apps	Goals	Apps	Goals	Apps	Goals	Apps	Goals
Tai Po	2006–07	17	3	1	0	4	0	1	0			23	3
Tai Po	2007–08	18	2	1	1	2	0	3	1			24	4
Tai Po	2008–09	23	6	1	0	2	1	4	2			30	9
Total										0	0		
South China	2009–10	15	1	3	1	–		0	0	9	1	27	3
South China	2010–11	12	3	1	0	1	0	2	0	3	0	16	3
South China	2011–12	3	0	0	0	0	0	0	0			3	0
Total		30	4	4	1	1	0	2	0	12	1	49	6

=== International ===
As of 15 October 2013.

#	Date	Venue	Opponents	Result	Goals	Competition
1	19 November 2008	UST Stadium, Macau	Macau	9–1	3	Friendly
2	14 January 2009	Hong Kong Stadium, So Kon Po, Hong Kong	India	2–1	0	Friendly
3	21 January 2009	Hong Kong Stadium, So Kon Po, Hong Kong	Bahrain	1–3	0	2011 AFC Asian Cup qualification
4	28 January 2009	Ali Muhesen Stadium, Sana'a, Yemen	Yemen	0–1	0	2011 AFC Asian Cup qualification
5	23 August 2009	World Games Stadium, Kaohsiung, Taiwan	Chinese Taipei	4–0	1	2010 EAFF Championship Semi-final
6	25 August 2009	World Games Stadium, Kaohsiung, Taiwan	North Korea	0–0	0	2010 EAFF Championship Semi-final
7	27 August 2009	World Games Stadium, Kaohsiung, Taiwan	Guam	12–0	0	2010 EAFF Championship Semi-final
8	9 October 2009	Outsourcing Stadium, Shizuoka, Japan	Japan	0–6	0	2011 AFC Asian Cup qualification
9	11 February 2010	Olympic Stadium, Tokyo, Japan	Japan	0–3	0	2010 East Asian Football Championship
10	4 October 2010	Balewadi Stadium, Pune, India	India	1–0	0	Friendly
11	17 November 2010	Hong Kong Stadium, So Kon Po, Hong Kong	Paraguay	0–7	0	Friendly
12	9 February 2011	Shah Alam Stadium, Kuala Lumpur, Malaysia	Malaysia	0–2	0	Friendly
13	3 June 2011	Siu Sai Wan Sports Ground, Siu Sai Wan, Hong Kong	Malaysia	1–1	0	Friendly
14	23 July 2011	Prince Mohamed bin Fahd Stadium, Dammam, Saudi Arabia	Saudi Arabia	0–3	0	2014 FIFA World Cup qualification
15	28 July 2011	Siu Sai Wan Sports Ground, Siu Sai Wan, Hong Kong	Saudi Arabia	0–5	0	2014 FIFA World Cup qualification
16	30 September 2011	Kaohsiung National Stadium, Kaohsiung, Taiwan	Philippines	3–3	1	2011 Long Teng Cup
17	2 October 2011	Kaohsiung National Stadium, Kaohsiung, Taiwan	Macau	5–1	0	2011 Long Teng Cup
18	4 October 2011	Kaohsiung National Stadium, Kaohsiung, Taiwan	Chinese Taipei	6–0	0	2011 Long Teng Cup
19	14 November 2012	Shah Alam Stadium, Shah Alam, Malaysia	Malaysia	1–1	0	Friendly
20	1 December 2012	Mong Kok Stadium, Mong Kok, Hong Kong	Guam	2–1	0	2013 EAFF East Asian Cup Preliminary Competition Round 2
21	3 December 2012	Mong Kok Stadium, Mong Kok, Hong Kong	Australia	0–1	0	2013 EAFF East Asian Cup Preliminary Competition Round 2
22	9 December 2012	Hong Kong Stadium, So Kon Po, Hong Kong	North Korea	0–4	0	2013 EAFF East Asian Cup Preliminary Competition Round 2
23	22 March 2013	Mong Kok Stadium, Mong Kok, Hong Kong	Vietnam	1–0	0	2015 AFC Asian Cup qualification
24	4 June 2013	Mong Kok Stadium, Mong Kok, Hong Kong	Philippines	0–1	0	Friendly
	6 September 2013	Thuwunna Stadium, Yangon, Myanmar	Myanmar	0–0	0	Friendly
25	10 September 2013	Mong Kok Stadium, Mong Kok, Hong Kong	Singapore	1–0	0	Friendly
26	15 October 2013	Hong Kong Stadium, So Kon Po, Hong Kong	United Arab Emirates	0–4	0	2015 AFC Asian Cup qualification

== Honours ==
Tai Po

- Hong Kong FA Cup: 2008–09

South China

- Hong Kong First Division: 2009–10
- Hong Kong Senior Shield: 2009–10

Hong Kong

- Guangdong-Hong Kong Cup: 2009, 2013

Individual

- Hong Kong Footballer of the Year: 2009

Awards and achievements
Preceded by First Holder	Hong Kong FA Cup; Player of the Tournament; 2008–09	Succeeded by Itaparica
