= Liu Quankun =

Hong Kong footballer (born 1983)

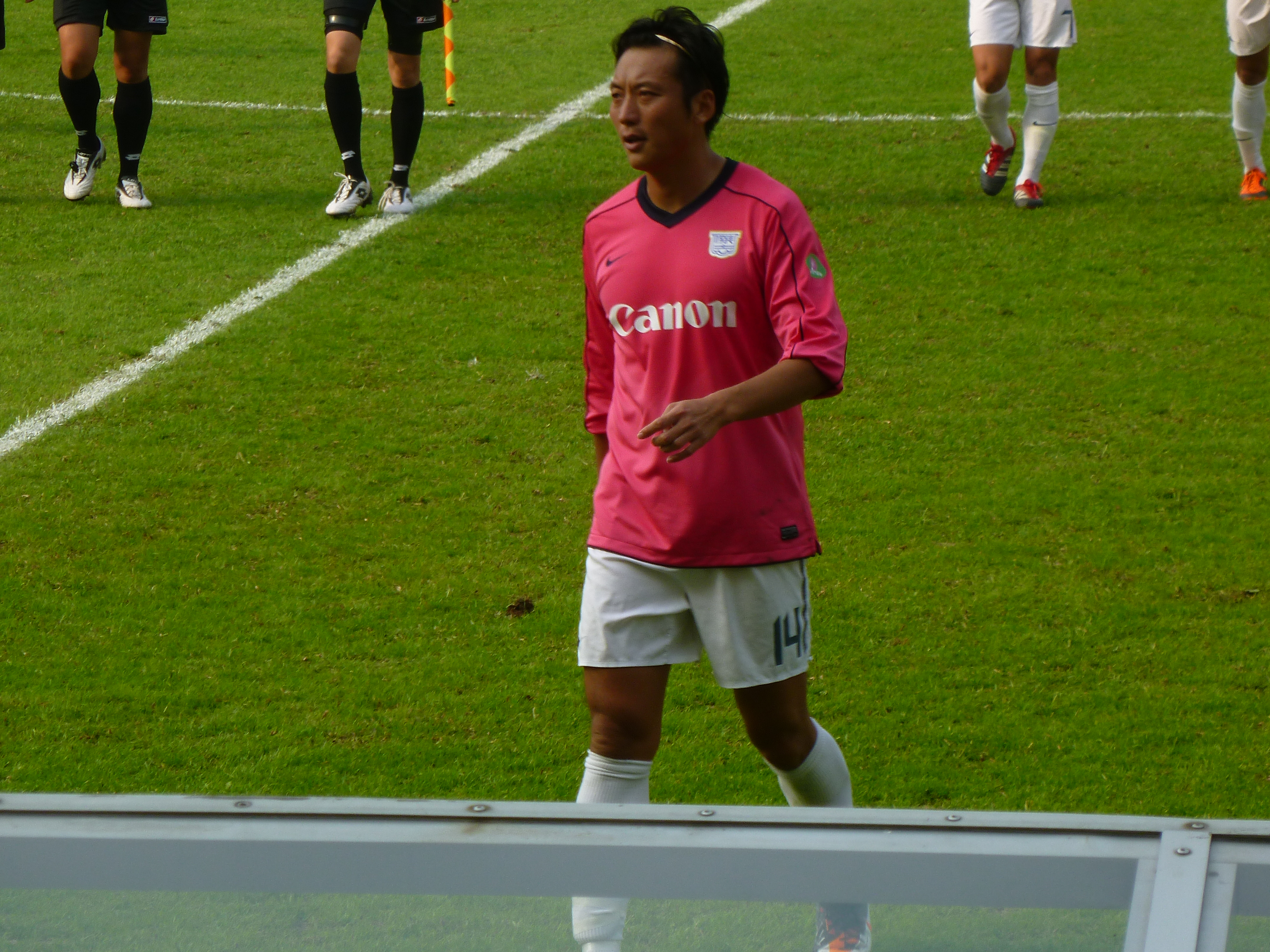

Personal information
- Full name: Liu Quankun
- Date of birth: 17 February 1983 (age 43)
- Place of birth: Dalian, Liaoning, China
- Height: 1.85 m (6 ft 1 in)
- Position: Defender

Senior career*
Years	Team	Apps	(Gls)
2002–2003	Dalian Shide	0	(0)
2003–2014	Kitchee	129	(6)
2015	Harbin Yiteng	0	(0)

International career^{‡}
2006–2013	Hong Kong	6	(0)
- * Club domestic league appearances and goals as of 1 November 2015 ‡ National team caps and goals as of 11 September 2013

Liu Quankun
- Traditional Chinese: 劉全昆
- Simplified Chinese: 刘全昆
Transcriptions
Standard Mandarin
- Hanyu Pinyin: Liú Quánkūn
Yue: Cantonese
- Jyutping: lau^{4} cyun^{4} gwan^{1}

Liu Quankun (simplified Chinese: 刘全昆; traditional Chinese: 劉全昆, born 17 February 1983) is a former professional footballer who played as a defender. Born in China, he represented Hong Kong internationally.

== Club career ==
Liu spent his youth career in Dalian Shide and moved to Hong Kong in 2003 when he started to play for Kitchee.

On 30 April 2008, in the 2008 AFC Cup group match against Singapore Armed Forces, Liu removed his shirt to fan his team-mate Lo Chi Hin, who had collapsed unconscious after suffering a suspected heart attack. Liu subsequently received a second yellow card from the Sri Lankan referee Hettikamkanamge Perera due to the removal of the shirt. In July, Liu received a formal apology from Mohammed bin Hammam, the President of Asian Football Confederation, for this wrong red card given.

On 2 February 2015, Liu transferred to China League One side Harbin Yiteng.

== International career ==
In 2005, Liu was eligible to represent Hong Kong national football team after staying in Hong Kong for two years. He made his international debut on 1 February 2006 in 2006 Carlsberg Cup third-place match versus Croatia national football team.

== Career statistics ==
=== International ===
As of 10 September 2013

#	Date	Venue	Opponents	Result	Goals	Competition
1	1 February 2006	Hong Kong Stadium, Hong Kong	Croatia	0–4	0	2006 Carlsberg Cup
2	15 February 2006	Hong Kong Stadium, Hong Kong	Singapore	1–1	0	Friendly
3	19 November 2008	Macau UST Stadium, Macau	Macau	9–1	0	Friendly
	1 January 2009	Yuexiushan Stadium, Guangzhou, China	Guangdong	1–3	0	2009 Guangdong–Hong Kong Cup
	4 January 2009	Mong Kok Stadium, Hong Kong	Guangdong	4–1	1	2009 Guangdong–Hong Kong Cup
4	21 January 2009	Hong Kong Stadium, Hong Kong	Bahrain	1–3	0	2011 AFC Asian Cup qualification
5	9 February 2011	Shah Alam Stadium, Kuala Lumpur	Malaysia	0–2	0	Friendly
6	September 2013	Thuwunna Stadium, Yangon, Myanmar	Myanmar	0–0	0	Friendly
6	10 September 2013	Mong Kok Stadium, Mong Kok, Hong Kong	Singapore	1–0	0	Friendly
