= Fang Jingqi =

Chinese footballer

Fang Jingqi 方镜淇
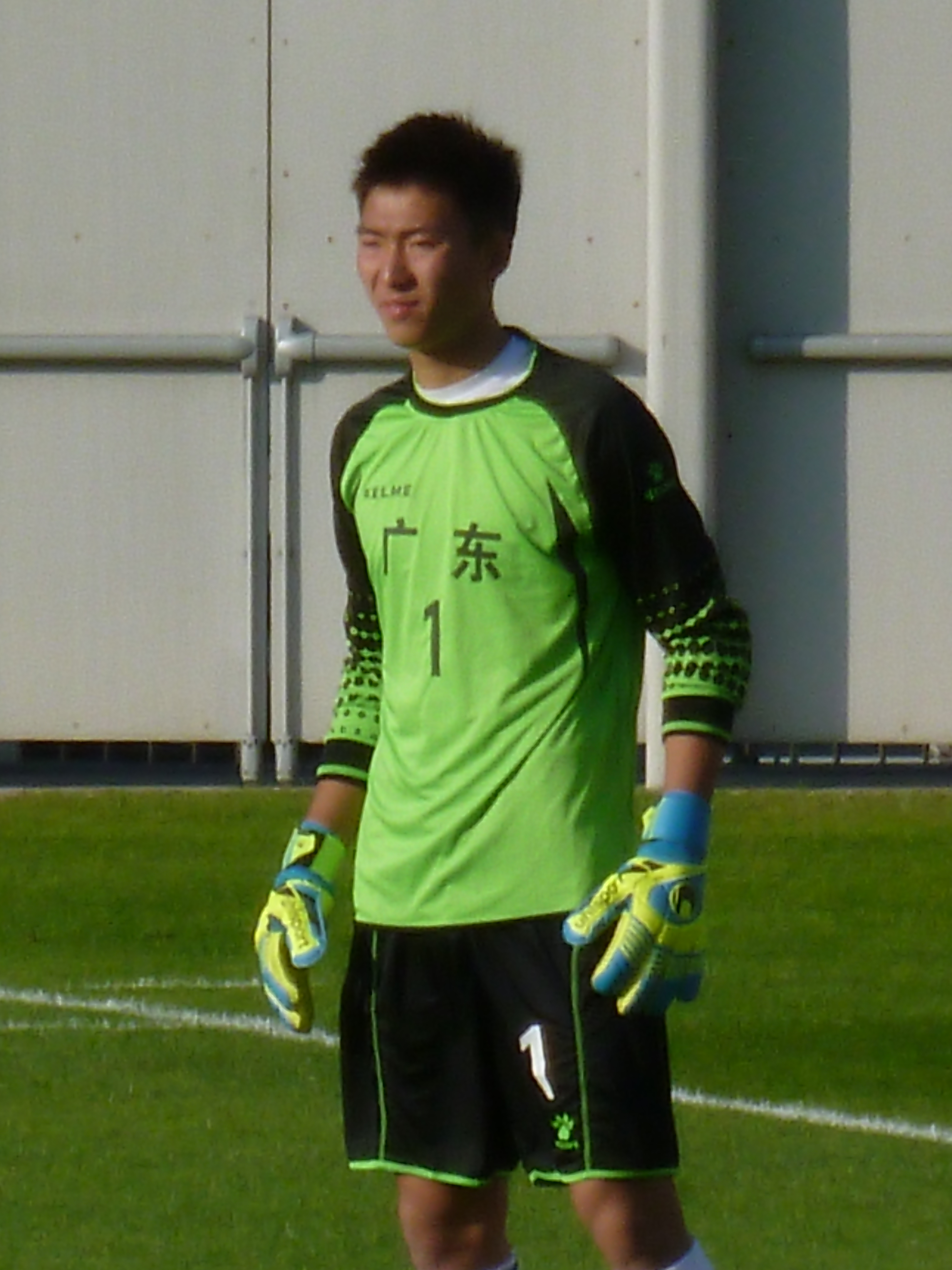
- Fang Jingqi (Guangdong–Hong Kong Cup, 2015)

Personal information
- Full name: Fang Jingqi
- Date of birth: 17 January 1993 (age 33)
- Place of birth: Guiyang, Guizhou, China
- Height: 1.88 m (6 ft 2 in)
- Position: Goalkeeper

Team information
- Current team: Wuhan Three Towns
- Number: 22

Youth career
- 2004–2005: Guangxi Jinsangzi Football School
- 2006–2010: Dongguan Nancheng

Senior career*
Years	Team	Apps	(Gls)
2011–2012	Dongguan Nancheng	17	(0)
2013–2017	Guangzhou Evergrande	0	(0)
2018–2019	Meixian Techand	5	(0)
2019	→ Tianjin Tianhai (loan)	6	(0)
2020	Taizhou Yuanda	11	(0)
2021–2025	Tianjin Jinmen Tiger	75	(0)
2026–	Wuhan Three Towns	21	(0)

International career^{‡}
2012–2014	China U-19	6	(0)
2013–2015	China U-23	7	(0)
- * Club domestic league appearances and goals as of 22 November 2026 ‡ National team caps and goals as of 1 June 2015

Fang Jingqi (Chinese: 方镜淇; pinyin: Fāng Jìngqí; Mandarin pronunciation: [fáŋ tɕîŋ tɕʰǐ]; born 17 January 1993) is a Chinese footballer who plays for Chinese Super League club Wuhan Three Towns.

== Club career ==
Fang Jingqi started his football career with China League Two side Dongguan Nancheng in 2011. Playing as the backup goalkeeper to Yang Chao, Fang made seven appearances in the group stage as Dongguan Nancheng finished the fourth place in the south group and entered the playoffs stage. He did not appear in any of the playoff matches as Dongguan lost to Chongqing FC 3–0 on aggregate in the semifinals which meant they failed to promote to China League One directly. The team then lost to Fujian Smart Hero 2–0 in the third place playoff match and failed to enter the relegation playoff. Although Fang became the first choice goalkeeper of the team in 2012, he played just ten league matches and two cup matches as he spent most of his time with the Chinese under-20 national team.

Fang transferred to Chinese Super League giant Guangzhou Evergrande along with his teammates Liao Lisheng, Yang Chaosheng, Li Weixin, Hu Weiwei, Zhang Xingbo and Wang Rui in November 2012. On 16 February 2014, he made his debut for the club against Guizhou Renhe in a 1–0 loss in the 2014 Chinese FA Super Cup. He made another appearance for the club on 13 May 2015, in the 2–1 away defeat against Xinjiang Tianshan Leopard in the third round of 2015 Chinese FA Cup. He came on substitution in 92nd minute when starting goalkeeper Li Shuai was sent off, but could not stop opponent's winner penalty in the stoppage time.

Fang transferred to China League One newcomer Meizhou Meixian Techand on 28 February 2018. On 11 April 2018, he made his debut in a 1–0 away defeat against Yanbian Beiguo in the third round of 2018 Chinese FA Cup.

On 7 February 2019, Fang was loaned to first-tier club Tianjin Tianhai for the 2019 season. On 1 March 2019, he made his Super League debut in the season's opener match against his former club Guangzhou Evergrande. He scored an own goal in the match which ended up with a 3–0 defeat. After making several further appearances his parent club would allow him to join Taizhou Yuanda.

On 10 April 2021, Fang joined top tier club Tianjin Jinmen Tiger for the start of the 2021 Chinese Super League campaign. He would go on to make his debut in a league game on 28 July 2021 against Changchun Yatai F.C. that ended in a 4-1 defeat. On 14 January 2026, Fang announced his departure after the 2025 season.

On 24 January 2026, Fang joined top tier club Wuhan Three Towns.

== Career statistics ==
As of 2 November 2024.

Appearances and goals by club, season and competition
Club	Season	League			National Cup		Continental		Other		Total	
Club	Season	Division	Apps	Goals	Apps	Goals	Apps	Goals	Apps	Goals	Apps	Goals
Dongguan Nancheng	2011	China League Two	7	0	–		–		–		7	0
Dongguan Nancheng	2012	China League Two	10	0	2	0	–		–		12	0
Dongguan Nancheng	Total		17	0	2	0	0	0	0	0	19	0
Guangzhou Evergrande	2013	Chinese Super League	0	0	0	0	0	0	0 (Note: Appearances in Chinese FA Super Cup)	0	0	0
Guangzhou Evergrande	2014	Chinese Super League	0	0	0	0	0	0	1	0	1	0
Guangzhou Evergrande	2015	Chinese Super League	0	0	1	0	0	0	0	0	1	0
Guangzhou Evergrande	2016	Chinese Super League	0	0	0	0	0	0	0	0	0	0
Guangzhou Evergrande	2017	Chinese Super League	0	0	0	0	0	0	0	0	0	0
Guangzhou Evergrande	Total		0	0	1	0	0	0	1	0	2	0
Meixian Techand	2018	China League One	5	0	1	0	–		–		6	0
Tianjin Tianhai (loan)	2019	Chinese Super League	6	0	1	0	–		–		7	0
Taizhou Yuanda	2020	China League One	11	0	1	0	–		–		12	0
Tianjin Jinmen Tiger	2021	Chinese Super League	15	0	1	0	–		–		16	0
Tianjin Jinmen Tiger	2022	Chinese Super League	11	0	0	0	–		–		11	0
Tianjin Jinmen Tiger	2023	Chinese Super League	10	0	2	0	–		–		12	0
Tianjin Jinmen Tiger	2024	Chinese Super League	29	0	0	0	–		–		29	0
Tianjin Jinmen Tiger	Total		65	0	3	0	0	0	0	0	68	0
Career total			104	0	9	0	0	0	1	0	114	0

== Honours ==
=== Club ===
Guangzhou Evergrande

- Chinese Super League: 2014, 2015, 2017
- Chinese FA Cup: 2016
- Chinese FA Super Cup: 2017
