= Stefan Antonić =

Hong Kong footballer

Personal information
- Full name: Stefan Antonić
- Date of birth: 6 February 2001 (age 25)
- Place of birth: Hong Kong
- Height: 1.75 m (5 ft 9 in)
- Position: Defender

Youth career
- 2013–2020: Kitchee

Senior career*
Years	Team	Apps	(Gls)
2020–2021	Southern	1	(0)
2022–2023	Sham Shui Po	7	(0)
2023–2024	HKFC	7	(0)
2025	HKFC	3	(0)
- * Club domestic league appearances and goals as of 30 June 2025

Stefan Antonić (Chinese: 斯特芬, born 6 February 2001) is a former Serbian professional footballer who played as a defender.

== Club career ==
=== Southern ===
On 6 June 2020, Antonić signed a contract with Hong Kong Premier League club Southern. He made his professional debut in the HKPL on 5 May 2021, against Resources Capital where he played as a starter.

=== Sham Shui Po ===
In October 2022, Antonić joined Sham Shui Po.

=== HKFC ===
On 16 September 2023, Antonić joined HKFC. He left the club at the end of the 2023–24 season.

In February 2025, Antonić rejoined HKFC.

== Personal life ==
Antonić was born on 6 February 2001 in Hong Kong to a Serbian father and an Indonesian mother. He is the son of football manager Dejan Antonić. He graduated from YMCA of Hong Kong Christian College in 2019.

== Career statistics ==
=== Club ===
As of 26 May 2024

Club	Season	League			Cup		Continental		Other		Total	
Club	Season	Division	Apps	Goals	Apps	Goals	Apps	Goals	Apps	Goals	Apps	Goals
Southern	2020–21	Hong Kong Premier League	1	0	0	0	–		4 (Note: Appearances in Hong Kong Sapling Cup)	1	5	1
Sham Shui Po	2022–23	Hong Kong Premier League	7	0	1	0	–		1 (Note: Appearances in Hong Kong Senior Shield)	0	9	0
HKFC	2023–24	Hong Kong Premier League	7	0	0	0	–		0	0	7	0
HKFC	2024–25	Hong Kong Premier League	0	0	0	0	–		0	0	0	0
Career total			15	0	1	0	0	0	5	1	21	1
