= Liao Lisheng =

Chinese footballer (born 1993)

Liao Lisheng 廖力生
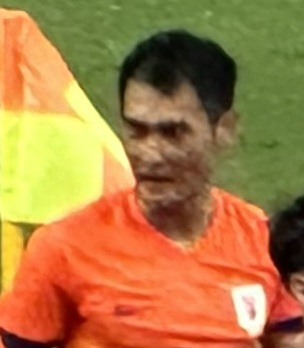
- Liao Lisheng in August 2024

Personal information
- Full name: Liao Lisheng
- Date of birth: 29 April 1993 (age 33)
- Place of birth: Shenzhen, Guangdong, China
- Height: 1.80 m (5 ft 11 in)
- Position: Midfielder

Team information
- Current team: Chengdu Rongcheng
- Number: 23

Youth career
- 2002–2004: Guangxi Hercules Football School
- 2005–2006: Zhaoqing Sunray Cave Football School
- 2006–2007: Gu Guangming Football School
- 2007–2008: Shenzhen Kingway
- 2008–2010: Dongguan Nancheng

Senior career*
Years	Team	Apps	(Gls)
2011–2012	Dongguan Nancheng	47	(8)
2013–2021	Guangzhou FC	88	(2)
2019	→ Tianjin Tianhai (loan)	18	(0)
2022–2024	Shandong Taishan	59	(6)
2025–	Chengdu Rongcheng	22	(1)
2025	→ Shenzhen Peng City (loan)	9	(0)

International career^{‡}
2011–2013	China U19	11	(2)
2013–2016	China U22	16	(6)
2014–	China	6	(0)
Medal record
Representing China
Men's football
EAFF Championship
Bronze medal – third place	2017 Japan	Team
- * Club domestic league appearances and goals as of 31 August 2026 ‡ National team caps and goals as of 29 March 2022

Liao Lisheng (Chinese: 廖力生; pinyin: Liào Lìshēng; Mandarin pronunciation: [ljâʊ lî ʂə́ŋ]; born 29 April 1993) is a Chinese professional footballer who currently plays as a midfielder for Chinese Super League club Shenzhen Peng City, on loan from Chengdu Rongcheng.

== Club career ==
=== Early life ===
Liao Lisheng was born in Longgang, Shenzhen to a Teochew family that originated from Jiexi. He started his football career when he received organized football training at age nine at the Guangxi Hercules Football School. He later trained with Zhaoqing Sunray Cave Football School, Gu Guangming Football School, and Shenzhen Kingway's youth academy between 2005 and 2008 and eventually joined Dongguan Nancheng's youth academy in 2008.

=== Dongguan Nancheng ===
Liao was promoted to Dongguan Nancheng's first team in the 2011 season. Liao scored three goals in 19 appearances in the group stage as Dongguan finished the fourth place in the south group and entered the playoff stage. Liao played in all five matches in the playoffs; however, Dongguan lost to Chongqing FC 3-0 on aggregate in the semifinals which meant they failed to be promoted to China League One directly, and then lost to Fujian Smart Hero 2-0 in the third place playoff and failed to enter the relegation playoffs.

Liao was then promoted to captain during the 2012 season. Although Dongguan was deemed as one of the hottest clubs for promotion in this season, they were knocked out by just finished the sixth place in the group stage. Liao played 23 league matches and scored four goals in the 2012 season. Liao scored the winning goal on 2 June 2012 in a 1-0 win against Tianjin Songjiang in the second round of the 2012 Chinese FA Cup, meaning Dongguan became the first third-tier club to reach the third round of FA Cup. They finally ended their FA Cup journey in the third round on 27 June 2012 in a 4-0 loss against Shandong Luneng.

=== Guangzhou Evergrande ===
After Dongguan Nancheng failed to be promoted to the second tier, Liao transferred to Chinese Super League giant Guangzhou Evergrande along with his teammates Fang Jingqi, Yang Chaosheng, Li Weixin, Hu Weiwei, Zhang Xingbo and Wang Rui in November 2012. He made his debut for the club on 30 October 2013 in a 1-1 draw against Shanghai East Asia. On 26 February 2014, he was substituted on for Muriqui at half time when Guangzhou was losing 2-0 against Melbourne Victory in the first match of 2014 AFC Champions League. He provided a crucial assist to Elkeson who scored and put Guangzhou 3-2 ahead, eventually winning the match 4-2. On 18 March 2014, he scored his first goal for the club in the third group match of 2014 AFC Champions League which ensured a 3-1 win against Jeonbuk Hyundai Motors. He played 28 matches for the club across all competitions in the 2014 season and was named as a candidate for Chinese Football Association Young Player of the Year award; however, he lost out to Liu Binbin who instead picked up the honour.

On 18 March 2015, Liao suffered a fifth metatarsal bone fracture in a 2015 AFC Champions League match against Kashima Antlers and received surgery in Italy later that month. He recovered from injury by August 2015 but didn't play for Guangzhou for the rest of the 2015 season. He made his return on 24 April 2016, 403 days after his injury, in a 4-0 away win against Tianjin Teda, coming on as a substitute for Alan Carvalho in the 85th minute. He scored his first goal in the Super League on 30 October 2016 in a 4-0 home victory against Shandong Luneng. In December 2016, Liao extended his contract with Guangzhou until the end of the 2021 season.

On 22 February 2017, Liao scored twice in Guangzhou's season opener, a 7-0 home win against Eastern in the 2017 AFC Champions League. On 2 May 2017, he scored the opening goal and assisted Gao Lin in a 2-1 win against Meixian Techand in the third round of the 2017 Chinese FA Cup.

On 7 February 2019, Liao was loaned to fellow top tier club Tianjin Tianhai for the 2019 season.

=== Shandong Taishan ===
On 22 March 2022, Liao joined fellow top tier Chinese football club Shandong Taishan for the start of the 2022 Chinese Super League campaign. He made his debut for the club on 3 June 2022 in a league game against Zhejiang FC that ended in a 1-0 victory. This would be followed by his first goal for the club, which was scored in a league game on 10 July 2022 against Dalian Pro in a 3-1 victory. He would establish himself as a regular member of the team's midfield that went on to the win the 2022 Chinese FA Cup with them.

=== Chengdu Rongcheng ===
On 18 February 2025, Liao joined Chinese Super League club Chengdu Rongcheng.

=== Shenzhen Peng City ===
On 16 July 2025, Liao was loaned out to another Chinese Super League club from his hometown Shenzhen Peng City.

== International career ==
Liao made his debut for the Chinese national team on 18 June 2014 in a 2-0 win against Macedonia. He was called up to China's final squad for the 2015 AFC Asian Cup but didn't appear in any matches during the tournament. Liao was named in the China national team's squad in November 2017 for the 2017 EAFF E-1 Football Championship by Marcello Lippi in place of injured Jiang Zhipeng. He left in advance without playing during the tournament for the birth of his child.

== Career statistics ==
=== Club ===
As of match played 31 December 2024.

Appearances and goals by club, season and competition
Club	Season	League			National Cup		Continental		Other		Total	
Club	Season	Division	Apps	Goals	Apps	Goals	Apps	Goals	Apps	Goals	Apps	Goals
Dongguan Nancheng	2011	China League Two	24	4	-		-		-		24	4
Dongguan Nancheng	2012	China League Two	23	4	3	1	-		-		26	5
Dongguan Nancheng	Total'		47	8	3	1	0	0	0	0	50	9
Guangzhou Evergrande	2013	Chinese Super League	1	0	0	0	0	0	0 (Note: Appearances in Chinese FA Super Cup)	0	1	0
Guangzhou Evergrande	2014	Chinese Super League	17	0	2	0	9	1	0	0	28	1
Guangzhou Evergrande	2015	Chinese Super League	1	0	0	0	1	0	0	0	2	0
Guangzhou Evergrande	2016	Chinese Super League	15	1	6	0	1	0	0	0	22	1
Guangzhou Evergrande	2017	Chinese Super League	16	0	6	1	7	2	1	0	30	3
Guangzhou Evergrande	2018	Chinese Super League	11	0	0	0	5	0	0	0	16	0
Guangzhou Evergrande	2020	Chinese Super League	8	0	1	0	3	0	-		12	0
Guangzhou Evergrande	2021	Chinese Super League	19	1	0	0	0	0	-		19	1
Guangzhou Evergrande	Total'		88	2	15	1	26	3	1	0	129	6
Tianjin Tianhai (loan)	2019	Chinese Super League	18	0	2	0	-		-		20	0
Shandong Taishan	2022	Chinese Super League	14	1	0	0	0	0	-		14	1
Shandong Taishan	2023	Chinese Super League	24	3	4	0	4	0	0	0	32	3
Shandong Taishan	2024	Chinese Super League	21	2	5	1	5	0	-		31	3
Shandong Taishan	Total'		59	6	9	1	9	0	0	0	77	7
Career total			212	16	29	3	35	3	1	0	277	22

=== International ===
National team
Year	Apps	Goals
2014	4	0
2022	2	0
Total	6	0

== Honours ==
Guangzhou Evergrande

- Chinese Super League: 2013, 2014, 2015, 2016, 2017
- AFC Champions League: 2013, 2015
- Chinese FA Cup: 2016
- Chinese FA Super Cup: 2016, 2017

Shandong Taishan

- Chinese FA Cup: 2022.
