= Liu Sheng (footballer) =

Chinese footballer

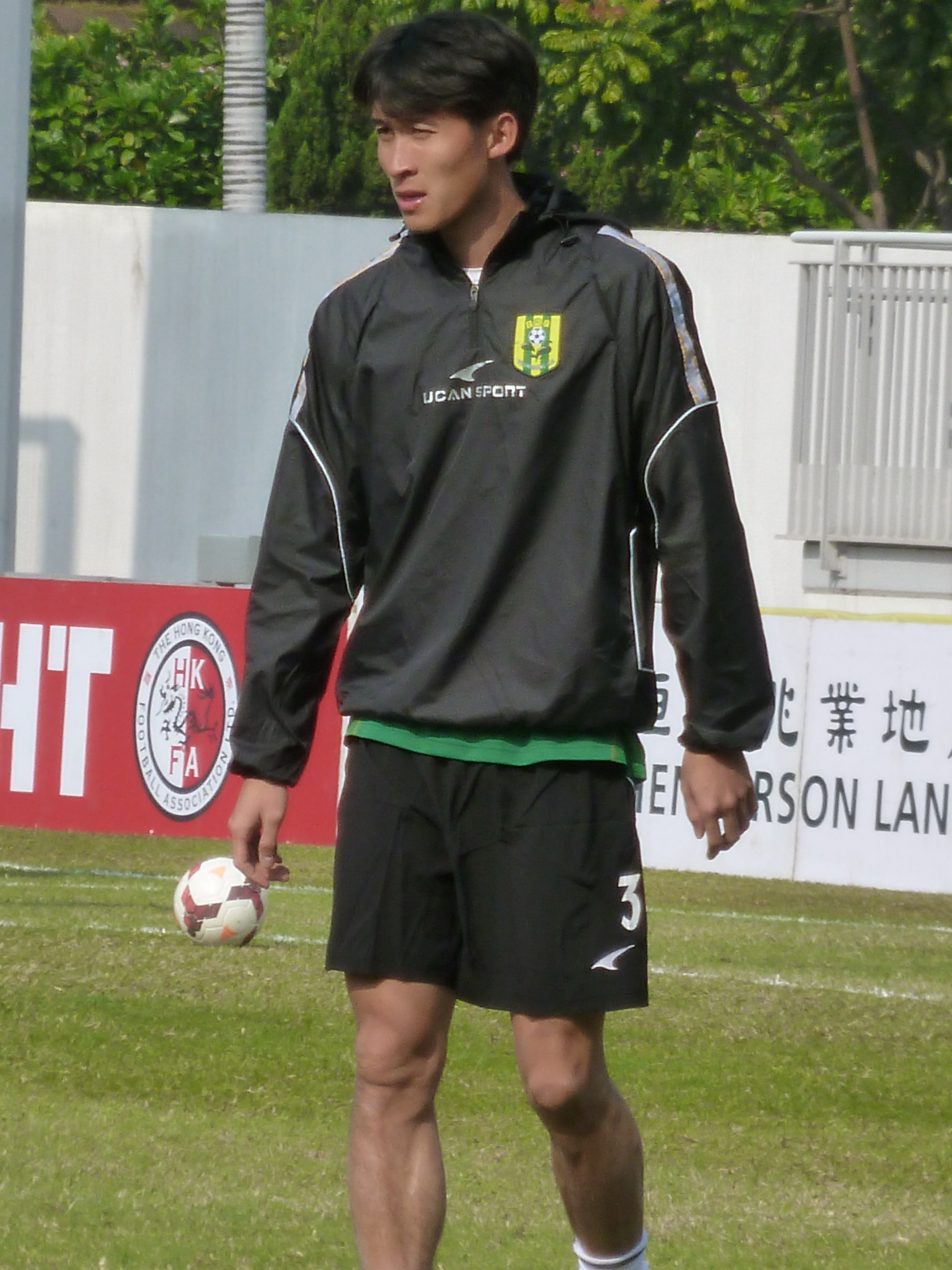
- Sheng at the 36th Guangdong-HongKong Cup in 2013

Personal information
- Date of birth: 8 September 1989 (age 37)
- Place of birth: Xingning, Guangdong, China
- Height: 1.84 m (6 ft 1/2 in)
- Position: Defender

Team information
- Current team: Meizhou Hakka
- Number: 33

Youth career
- Guangdong Youth

Senior career*
Years	Team	Apps	(Gls)
2007–2014	Guangdong Sunray Cave	86	(4)
2015–2017	Tianjin Quanjian	52	(3)
2018–2019	Meixian Techand	28	(0)
2020–2022	Wuhan Three Towns	8	(0)
2021	Meizhou Hakka (Loan)	19	(4)
2022–	Meizhou Hakka	5	(0)
- * Club domestic league appearances and goals as of 31 December 2022

Liu Sheng (simplified Chinese: 刘盛; traditional Chinese: 劉盛; pinyin: Liú Shèng; born 8 September 1989 in Xingning) is a Chinese footballer who currently plays as a defender for Meizhou Hakka.

== Club career ==
Liu Sheng started his professional career with China League Two side Guangdong Sunray Cave in 2007. He would often been used as a substitute early in career, however he was part of the Guangdong Sunray Cave squad that won promotion to the second tier in 2008. Going on to establish himself as a regular within the team on 1 September 2012, he scored his first senior goal in a 2–2 away draw against Chongqing Lifan.

In February 2015, Liu transferred to China League One side Tianjin Songjiang. He kept his starting position in the team throughout the 2016 season when Quanjian Nature Medicine took over the club. He made 23 league appearances and scored one goal as Tianjin Quanjian won the title and promoted to the Chinese Super League. He made his Super League debut on 4 November 2017 in a 2–1 away win against Guangzhou Evergrande.

On 28 February 2018, Liu transferred to newly promoted China League One side Meixian Techand. In his first season with the club he would aid them in remaining within the league by helping them avoid relegation. At the end of the following campaign the club dissolved after failing to submit a salary and bonus confirmation form.

On 8 August 2020, he signed with Wuhan Three Towns. In his first season with the club he would go on to aid them in winning the division title and promotion into the second tier. Despite gaining promotion with Wuhan Three Towns, Liu was allowed to return to his hometown and join another second-tier club in Meizhou Hakka on loan on 13 April 2021. He would then go on to be a vital member of the team that gained promotion to the top tier after coming second within the division at the end of the 2021 China League One campaign. On 19 March 2022 his loan move to Meizhou would become permanent.

== Career statistics ==
Statistics accurate as of match played 31 December 2022.

Appearances and goals by club, season and competition
Club	Season	League			National Cup		Continental		Other		Total	
Club	Season	Division	Apps	Goals	Apps	Goals	Apps	Goals	Apps	Goals	Apps	Goals
Guangdong Sunray Cave	2007	China League Two			-		-		-		?	?
Guangdong Sunray Cave	2008	China League Two	?	?	-		-		-		?	?
Guangdong Sunray Cave	2009	China League One	6	0	-		-		-		6	0
Guangdong Sunray Cave	2010	China League One	5	0	-		-		-		5	0
Guangdong Sunray Cave	2011	China League One	14	0	3	0	-		-		17	0
Guangdong Sunray Cave	2012	China League One	11	1	2	0	-		-		13	1
Guangdong Sunray Cave	2013	China League One	29	2	3	0	-		-		32	2
Guangdong Sunray Cave	2014	China League One	21	1	1	0	-		-		22	1
Guangdong Sunray Cave	Total		86	4	9	0	0	0	0	0	95	4
Tianjin Quanjian	2015	China League One	28	2	0	0	-		-		28	2
Tianjin Quanjian	2016	China League One	23	1	3	0	-		-		26	1
Tianjin Quanjian	2017	Chinese Super League	1	0	3	0	-		-		4	0
Tianjin Quanjian	Total		52	3	6	0	0	0	0	0	58	3
Meixian Techand	2018	China League One	18	0	0	0	-		2 (Note: Appearance(s) in CL1 Relegation play-offs)	0	20	0
Meixian Techand	2019	China League One	10	0	1	0	-		-		11	0
Meixian Techand	Total		28	0	1	0	0	0	2	0	31	0
Wuhan Three Towns	2020	China League Two	8	0	-		-		-		8	0
Meizhou Hakka (Loan)	2021	China League One	19	4	1	0	-		-		20	4
Meizhou Hakka	2022	Chinese Super League	5	0	0	0	-		-		5	0
Career total			198	11	17	0	0	0	2	0	217	11

== Honours ==
=== Club ===
Tianjin Quanjian F.C.

- China League One: 2016

Wuhan Three Towns

- China League Two: 2020
