= Hu Weiwei (footballer) =

Chinese footballer (born 1993)

Hu Weiwei 胡威威
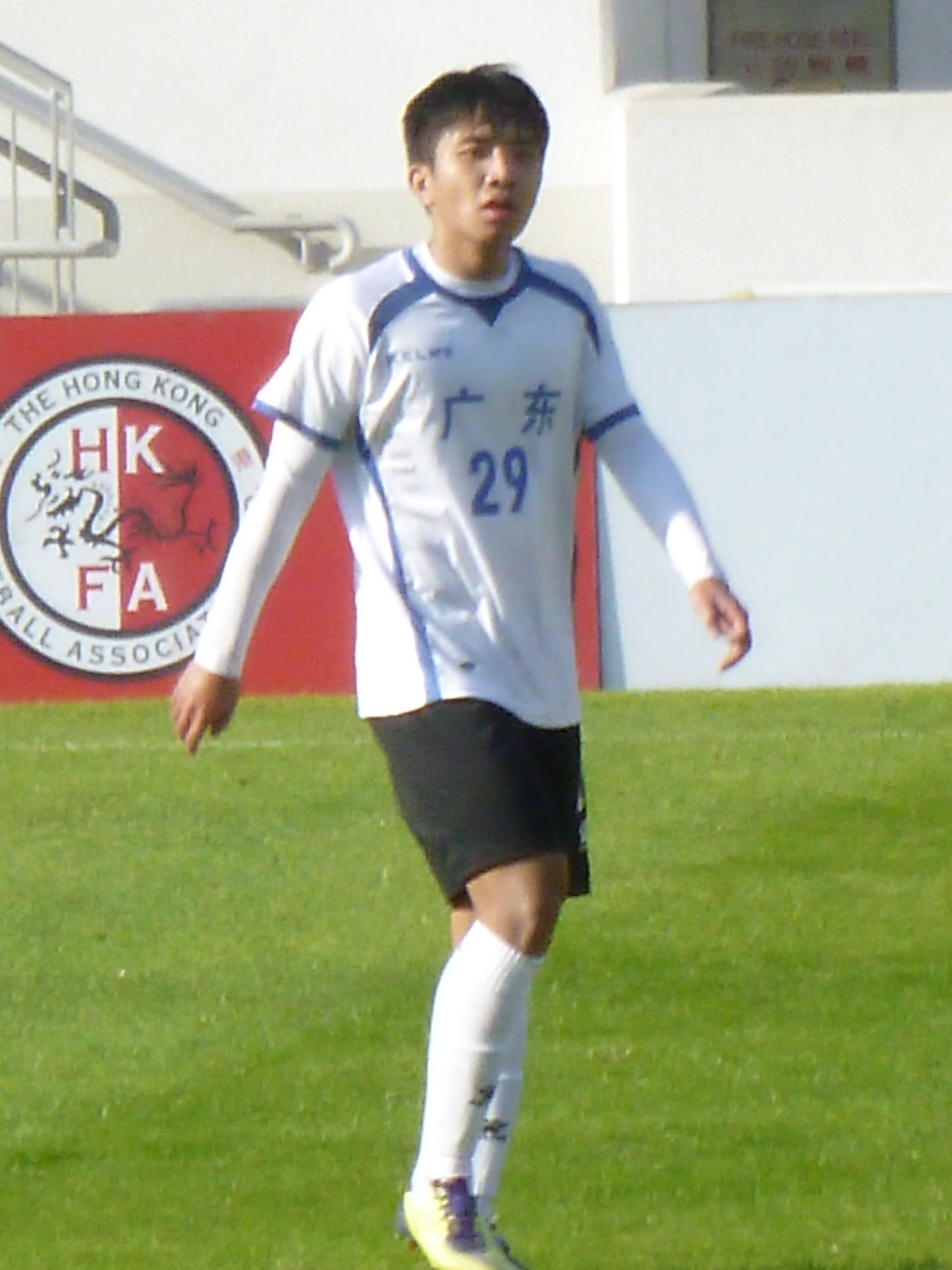

Personal information
- Full name: Hu Weiwei
- Date of birth: 3 March 1993 (age 33)
- Place of birth: Wuhua, Guangdong, China
- Height: 1.73 m (5 ft 8 in)
- Position: Right winger

Youth career
- Mingyu Football School
- Dongguan Nancheng

Senior career*
Years	Team	Apps	(Gls)
2011–2012	Dongguan Nancheng	33	(2)
2013–2014	Guangzhou	2	(0)
2015–2017	Qingdao Jonoon	28	(0)
2018	Shenzhen Ledman	25	(1)

International career
2009–2010	China U-17	8	(9)
- * Club domestic league appearances and goals as of 13 October 2018

Hu Weiwei (Chinese: 胡威威; pinyin: Hú Wēiwēi; born 3 March 1993) is a Chinese footballer who currently plays for Shenzhen Ledman in the China League Two.

== Club career ==
Hu started his football career with China League Two side Dongguan Nancheng in 2011. Playing as a winger in the team, he scored one goal in sixteen appearances for the club in the 2011 season. Dongguan Nancheng lost to Chongqing F.C. 3–0 on aggregate in the semi-finals during the promotion playoffs which meant they failed to promote to China League One directly, and then lost to Fujian Smart Hero 2–0 in the third-place playoff and failed to enter the relegation playoffs. Although Dongguan Nancheng was deemed as one of the hottest clubs for promotion in the 2012 season, they were knocked out from the group stage by finished the sixth place in south group. Hu played seventeen league matches and scored a goal during the 2012 season.

Hu transferred to Chinese Super League giant Guangzhou Evergrande along with his teammates Fang Jingqi, Liao Lisheng, Yang Chaosheng, Li Weixin, Zhang Xingbo and Wang Rui in November 2012. He made his debut for Guangzhou on 7 August 2013 in the fifth round of 2013 Chinese FA Cup in a 2–2 draw against Hangzhou Greentown but winning 5–3 in the penalty shootout, coming on as a substitute for Shi Hongjun in the 68th minute. His league debut for Guangzhou came on 15 October 2013 in a 1–1 away draw against Liaoning Whowin, coming on as a substitute for Zhang Hongnan in the 47th minute.

On 11 February 2015, Hu transferred to China League One side Qingdao Jonoon. In March 2018, Hu transferred to China League Two side Shenzhen Ledman.

== International career ==
Hu scored nine goals in five matches for the Chinese under-17 national team during 2010 AFC U-16 Championship qualification. He played all three group stage matches for China in the 2010 AFC U-16 Championship.

== International goals ==
No.	Date	Venue	Opponent	Score	Result	Competition
1.	23 September 2009	Xianghe, China	Macau	3–0	14–0	2010 AFC U-16 Championship qualification
2.	23 September 2009	Xianghe, China	Macau	4–0	14–0	2010 AFC U-16 Championship qualification
3.	23 September 2009	Xianghe, China	Macau	7–0	14–0	2010 AFC U-16 Championship qualification
4.	23 September 2009	Xianghe, China	Macau	8–0	14–0	2010 AFC U-16 Championship qualification
5.	26 September 2009	Xianghe, China	Hong Kong	2–0	6–0	2010 AFC U-16 Championship qualification
6.	26 September 2009	Xianghe, China	Hong Kong	5–0	6–0	2010 AFC U-16 Championship qualification
7.	28 September 2009	Xianghe, China	Guam	2–0	2–0	2010 AFC U-16 Championship qualification
8.	1 October 2009	Xianghe, China	Singapore	5–0	7–0	2010 AFC U-16 Championship qualification
9.	1 October 2009	Xianghe, China	Singapore	7–0	7–0	2010 AFC U-16 Championship qualification

== Career statistics ==
Statistics accurate as of match played 13 October 2018.

Club performance			League		Cup		League Cup		Continental		Others		Total	
Season	Club	League	Apps	Goals	Apps	Goals	Apps	Goals	Apps	Goals	Apps	Goals	Apps	Goals
China PR			League		FA Cup		CSL Cup		Asia		Super Cup		Total	
2011	Dongguan Nancheng	China League Two	16	1	-		-		-		-		16	1
2012	Dongguan Nancheng	China League Two	17	1	2	0	-		-		-		19	1
2013	Guangzhou Evergrande	Chinese Super League	2	0	2	0	-		0	0	0	0	4	0
2014	Guangzhou Evergrande	Chinese Super League	0	0	0	0	-		0	0	1	0	1	0
2015	Qingdao Jonoon	China League One	2	0	1	0	-		-		-		3	0
2016	Qingdao Jonoon	China League One	3	0	2	0	-		-		-		5	0
2017	Qingdao Jonoon	China League Two	23	0	0	0	-		-		-		23	0
2018	Shenzhen Ledman	China League Two	25	1	1	1	-		-		-		26	2
Total	China PR		88	3	8	1	0	0	0	0	1	0	97	4

== Honours ==
=== Club ===
Guangzhou Evergrande

- Chinese Super League: 2013, 2014
- AFC Champions League: 2013
