= Yang Chaosheng =

Chinese footballer (born 1993)

Yang Chaosheng 杨超声
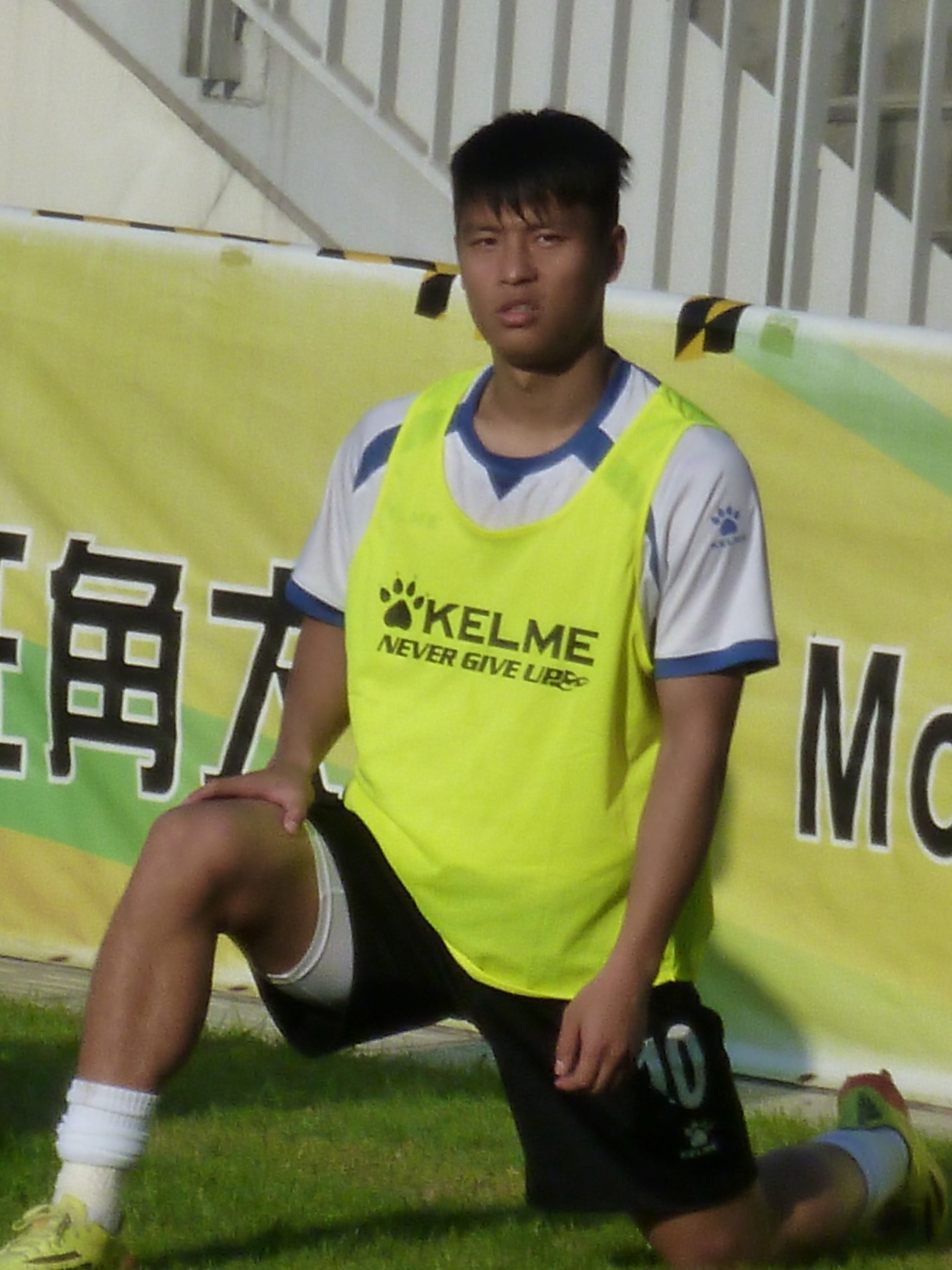

Personal information
- Full name: Yang Chaosheng
- Date of birth: 22 July 1993 (age 33)
- Place of birth: Dongguan, Guangdong, China
- Height: 1.74 m (5 ft 9 in)
- Positions: Striker; winger

Team information
- Current team: Meizhou Hakka
- Number: 16

Youth career
- 2008–2010: Dongguan Nancheng

Senior career*
Years	Team	Apps	(Gls)
2011–2012	Dongguan Nancheng	47	(14)
2013–2018	Guangzhou Evergrande	4	(0)
2014–2015	→ Liaoning FC (loan)	30	(5)
2016	→ Wuhan Zall (loan)	24	(2)
2019–2021	Changchun Yatai	45	(5)
2022–	Meizhou Hakka	94	(10)

International career^{‡}
2012–2014	China U-19	7	(3)
2013–2016	China U-23	15	(1)
- * Club domestic league appearances and goals as of 31 December 2025 ‡ National team caps and goals as of 18 September 2016

Yang Chaosheng
- Simplified Chinese: 杨超声
- Hakka: Yong^{2} Cau^{1}sang^{1} (Meixian); Yòng Chhêu-sâng (Sixian)
Transcriptions
Standard Mandarin
- Hanyu Pinyin: Yáng Chāoshēng
- IPA: [jǎŋ ʈʂʰáʊ ʂə́ŋ]
Hakka
- Romanization: Yong^{2} Cau^{1}sang^{1} (Meixian); Yòng Chhêu-sâng (Sixian)
Yue: Cantonese
- Jyutping: Jeong4 Ciu1sing1
- IPA: [jœŋ˩ tsʰiw˥ sɪŋ˥]

Yang Chaosheng (simplified Chinese: 杨超声; traditional Chinese: 楊超聲; pinyin: Yáng Chāoshēng; born 22 July 1993) is a Chinese footballer who currently plays for Meizhou Hakka in the China League One.

== Club career ==
Yang Chaosheng was born in Dongguan to a Hakka family that originated from Longchuan. He started his football career with China League Two side Dongguan Nancheng in 2011. He played all 25 matches and scored five goals for the club in the 2011 season. Dongguan lost to Chongqing FC 3–0 on aggregate in the semifinals of the promotion playoffs which meant they failed to promote to China League One directly and then lost to Fujian Smart Hero 2–0 in the third place playoff and failed to enter the relegation playoffs. Although Dongguan was deemed as one of the hottest clubs of promotion in the 2012 season, they were knocked out from the group stage by finishing in sixth place in the south group. Yang scored nine goals in 22 appearances in the 2012 season.

Yang transferred to Chinese Super League giant Guangzhou Evergrande along with his teammates Fang Jingqi, Liao Lisheng, Li Weixin, Hu Weiwei, Zhang Xingbo and Wang Rui in November 2012. He made his debut for the club on 10 July 2013 in the fourth round of the 2013 Chinese FA Cup in which Guangzhou beat Dalian Ruilong 7–1. On 7 August 2013, he scored his first goal for the club which ensured Guangzhou tie 2–2 with Hangzhou Greentown in the fifth round of the FA Cup and win 5–3 in the penalty shootout.

In July 2014, Yang joined Liaoning FC on a half-year loan deal. He made his debut and scored his first goal for the club on 20 July 2014 in a 3–2 loss to Shanghai Greenland. At the end of the 2014 season, Yang went on to make 11 appearances and scoring once in all competitions. Liaoning extended his loan deal for another year in January 2015. On 25 October 2015, he scored his fourth goal of the season in a 1–0 win over Shanghai Shenhua, which ensured Liaoning's stay in the top flight for the next season.

On 26 February 2016, Yang was loaned to China League One club Wuhan Zall for one season. He made his debut for the club on 12 March 2016 in a 1–1 draw against Beijing Enterprises. On 27 August 2016, he scored his first goal in his 22nd appearance for the club, in a 4–0 win over Dalian Yifang. On 18 September 2016, Yang scored his second goal of the season by shooting the winner in a 1–0 win against Meizhou Hakka. However, he was knocked off balance by his former teammate Tang Dechao and transported to hospital eleven minutes later after his goal. After diagnosed as fibular comminuted fracture and dislocation of ankle joint in his right leg, he received first stage surgery in Guangzhou on 19 September 2016 and second stage surgery in Germany in October 2016.

Yang made his return on 4 January 2018 in the first leg of 2018 Guangdong–Hong Kong Cup. He was linked with Guangzhou Evergrande's city rivals Guangzhou R&F but finally stayed at Evergrande for the disagreement of transfer fee. He was released at the end of 2018 when his contract expired.

After an unsuccessful trial with Guangzhou R&F, Yang joined newly relegated China League One side Changchun Yatai in February 2019. With them he would go on to win the division title and promotion at the end of the 2020 China League One campaign.

On 22 March 2022, Yang transferred to Chinese Super League club Meizhou Hakka. He would go on to make his debut in a league game on 4 June 2022 against Tianjin Jinmen Tiger in a 1–1 draw. This would be followed by his first goal for the club, which was in a league game on 5 December 2022 against Hebei in a 4–0 victory.

== International career ==
Yang made his debut for the Chinese national team on 13 December 2014 in a 4–0 win against Kyrgyzstan; however, the match was not recognized as an international "A" match by FIFA.

== Career statistics ==
As of 31 December 2025.

Appearances and goals by club, season and competition
Club	Season	League			National Cup		Continental		Other		Total	
Club	Season	Division	Apps	Goals	Apps	Goals	Apps	Goals	Apps	Goals	Apps	Goals
Dongguan Nancheng	2011	China League Two	25	5	-		-		-		25	5
Dongguan Nancheng	2012	China League Two	22	9	3	0	-		-		25	9
Dongguan Nancheng	Total		47	14	3	0	0	0	0	0	50	0
Guangzhou Evergrande	2013	Chinese Super League	4	0	4	1	0	0	0	0	8	1
Guangzhou Evergrande	2014	Chinese Super League	0	0	0	0	0	0	1 (Note: Appearances in Chinese FA Super Cup)	0	1	0
Guangzhou Evergrande	Total		4	0	4	1	0	0	1	0	9	1
Liaoning FC (loan)	2014	Chinese Super League	11	1	0	0	-		-		11	1
Liaoning FC (loan)	2015	Chinese Super League	19	4	0	0	-		-		19	4
Liaoning FC (loan)	Total		30	5	0	0	0	0	0	0	30	5
Wuhan Zall (loan)	2016	China League One	24	2	1	0	-		-		25	2
Changchun Yatai	2019	China League One	20	5	2	0	-		-		22	5
Changchun Yatai	2020	China League One	11	0	2	2	-		-		13	2
Changchun Yatai	2021	Chinese Super League	14	0	1	0	-		-		15	0
Changchun Yatai	Total		45	5	5	2	0	0	0	0	50	7
Meizhou Hakka	2022	Chinese Super League	16	1	1	0	-		-		17	1
Meizhou Hakka	2023	Chinese Super League	23	4	0	0	-		-		23	4
Meizhou Hakka	2024	Chinese Super League	25	2	1	0	-		-		26	2
Meizhou Hakka	2025	Chinese Super League	30	3	1	0	-		-		31	3
Meizhou Hakka	Total		94	10	3	0	0	0	0	0	97	10
Career total			244	36	16	3	0	0	1	0	261	39

== Honours ==
=== Club ===
Guangzhou Evergrande

- Chinese Super League: 2013
- AFC Champions League: 2013
- Chinese FA Super Cup: 2017

Changchun Yatai

- China League One: 2020
