= Zhang Xunwei =

Chinese footballer

Zhang Xunwei 张迅伟
Personal information
- Date of birth: February 28, 1989 (age 37)
- Place of birth: Shenyang, Liaoning, China
- Height: 1.87 m (6 ft 2 in)
- Position: Goalkeeper

Senior career*
Years	Team	Apps	(Gls)
2006–2014	Shenzhen Ruby	62	(0)
2015–2016	Shanghai Shenxin	12	(0)
2017	Jiangxi Liansheng	23	(0)
2018	Hubei Chufeng United	0	(0)
2019	Shenyang Urban	12	(0)
2020–2021	Jiangsu Zhongnan Codion		
2021-2022	Quanzhou Yassin	23	(0)
2023	Dongguan United	13	(0)
- * Club domestic league appearances and goals as of 31 December 2020

Zhang Xunwei (Chinese: 张迅伟; born 28 February 1989 in Liaoning) is a Chinese football player.

== Club career ==
In 2006, Zhang Xunwei started his professional footballer career with Shenzhen Ruby in the Chinese Super League. He would eventually make his league debut for Shenzhen on 17 April 2009 in a game against Shanghai Shenhua. On 4 January 2015, Zhang transferred to Chinese Super League side Shanghai Shenxin.

In March 2017, Zhang transferred to League Two side Jiangxi Liansheng.

== Career statistics ==
Statistics accurate as of match played 31 December 2020.

Club	Season	League			National Cup		Continental		Other		Total	
Club	Season	Division	Apps	Goals	Apps	Goals	Apps	Goals	Apps	Goals	Apps	Goals
Shenzhen Ruby	2006	Chinese Super League	0	0	0	0	-		-		0	0
Shenzhen Ruby	2007	Chinese Super League	0	0	-		-		-		0	0
Shenzhen Ruby	2008	Chinese Super League	0	0	-		-		-		0	0
Shenzhen Ruby	2009	Chinese Super League	3	0	-		-		-		3	0
Shenzhen Ruby	2010	Chinese Super League	1	0	-		-		-		1	0
Shenzhen Ruby	2011	Chinese Super League	18	0	0	0	-		-		18	0
Shenzhen Ruby	2012	China League One	14	0	1	0	-		-		15	0
Shenzhen Ruby	2013	China League One	7	0	2	0	-		-		9	0
Shenzhen Ruby	2014	China League One	19	0	1	0	-		-		20	0
Shenzhen Ruby	Total		62	0	4	0	0	0	0	0	66	0
Shanghai Shenxin	2015	Chinese Super League	8	0	0	0	-		-		8	0
Shanghai Shenxin	2016	China League One	4	0	2	0	-		-		6	0
Shanghai Shenxin	Total		12	0	2	0	0	0	0	0	14	0
Jiangxi Liansheng	2017	China League Two	23	0	3	0	-		-		26	0
Hubei Chufeng United	2018	Chinese Champions League	-		3	0	-		-		3	0
Shenyang Urban	2019	China League Two	12	0	1	0	-		-		13	0
Career total			110	0	13	0	0	0	0	0	123	0

== Honours ==
=== Club ===
Shenyang Urban

- China League Two: 2019
