= Goran Paulić =

Croatian footballer (born 1965)

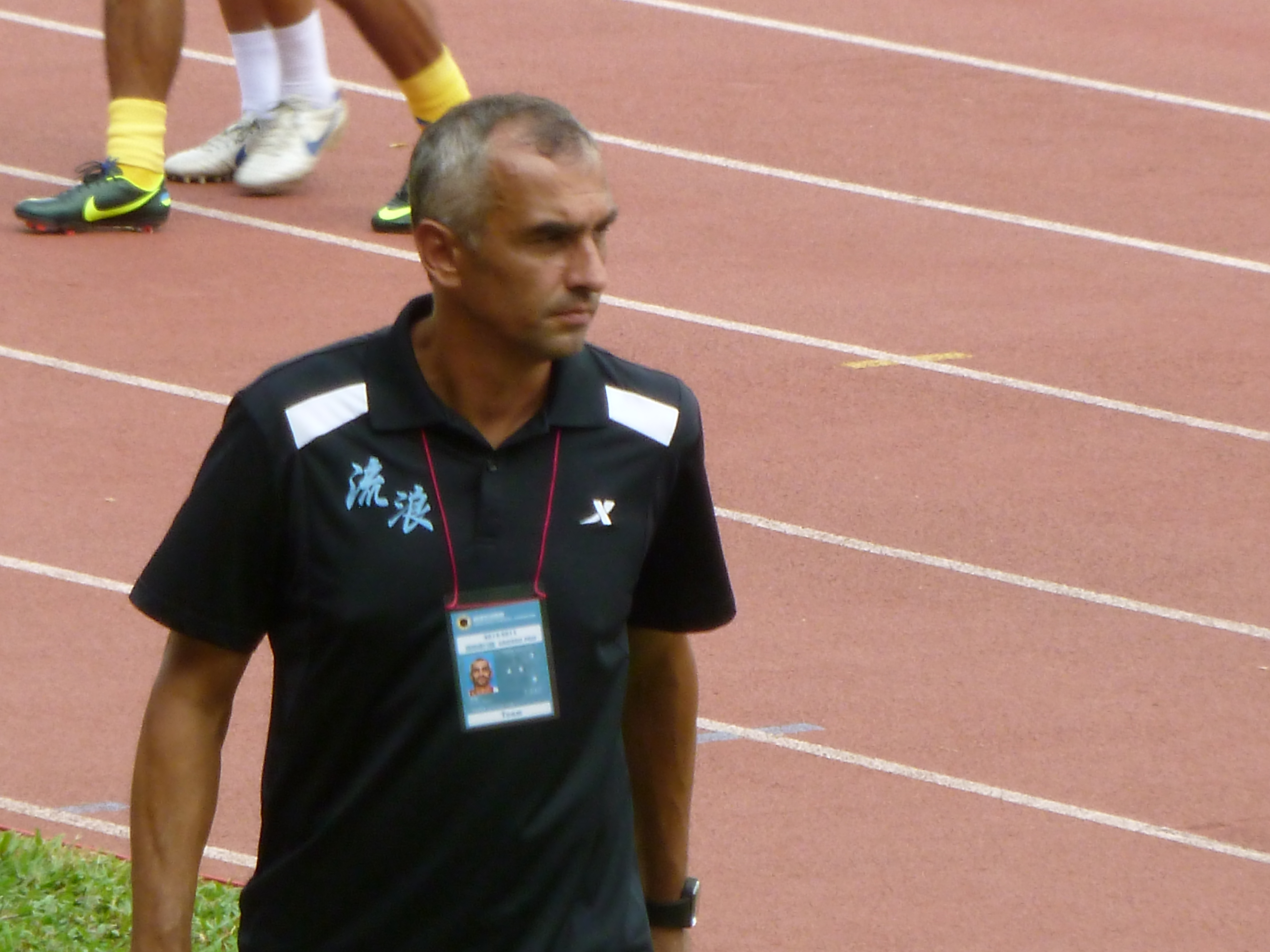
- Paulić as manager of Hong Kong Rangers in 2012

Personal information
- Date of birth: 31 March 1965 (age 61)
- Place of birth: Trnje, Zagreb, SFR Yugoslavia
- Position: Forward

Senior career*
Years	Team	Apps	(Gls)
1991–1992	Balestier United		
1993	Malacca FA		
1993–1994	Istra Pula	4	(2)
1995–1996	Waidhofen		
1996–1998	Balestier Central		
1998–2001	Hong Kong Rangers		
2001–2005	Sturm 19 St. Pölten		
2005–2006	SC St. Pölten		
2006–2007	SCU Kilb		

Managerial career
- 2008–2009: Hong Kong U23
- 2008–2009: Hong Kong
- 20102011: Dinamo Zagreb (assistant)
- 2012: Dongguan Nancheng
- 2012: Hong Kong Rangers
- 2014–2015: Johor Darul Ta'zim II
- 2016: Hrvatski Dragovoljac (assistant)
- 2017–2018: Ras Al Khaimah
- 2018–2020: Kuwait (assistant)
- 2023–2024: Persib Bandung (assistant)
- * Club domestic league appearances and goals

Goran Paulić (born 31 March 1965) is a former football player and coach.

== Playing career ==
As a player, he has played for clubs in Croatia, Austria, Malaysia, Singapore and Hong Kong.

== Managerial career ==
As a coach, he has coached the Hong Kong national team (in a joint head coach role with Dejan Antonić), Hong Kong under-23 national team, Hong Kong Rangers, Dongguan Nancheng and Johor Darul Ta'zim II.

== Honours ==
=== Individual ===
- S.League Top Scorer: 1997
