= Dejan Antonić =

Serbian footballer (born 1969)

Personal information
- Date of birth: 22 January 1969 (age 57)
- Place of birth: Belgrade, SR Serbia, Yugoslavia
- Position: Midfielder

Youth career
- 1984–1989: Red Star Belgrade

Senior career*
Years	Team	Apps	(Gls)
1989–1990	Spartak Subotica	14	(0)
1990–1992	Napredak Kruševac	59	(4)
1992–1994	Beveren	20	(0)
1994–1995	Obilić	29	(2)
1995	Persebaya Surabaya		
1996	Persema Malang		
1996–1998	Persita Tangerang		
1998–2001	Instant-Dict		
2001–2002	Hong Kong Rangers		
2002–2003	Sun Hei		
2003–2005	Kitchee		

Managerial career
- 2005–2008: Kitchee
- 2007–2009: Hong Kong
- 2009: Pegasus
- 2010: Shatin
- 2010–2011: Tai Chung
- 2011–2012: Tuen Mun
- 2012–2013: Arema Indonesia
- 2013: Pro Duta
- 2013–2015: Pelita Bandung Raya
- 2016: Persib Bandung
- 2016–2017: South China
- 2017: Rangers (HKG)
- 2018–2019: Borneo
- 2019–2020: Madura United
- 2020–2021: PSS Sleman
- 2022: Barito Putera
- 2023: Jinan Xingzhou
- 2023–2024: Foshan Nanshi
- 2025–2026: Semen Padang
- 2026–: Mohammedan
Medal record
Representing Yugoslavia
Gold medal – first place	WYC Chile 1987	1987
- * Club domestic league appearances and goals

Dejan Antonić (Serbian Cyrillic: Дејан Антонић, Chinese: 狄恩; born 22 January 1969) is a Serbian football manager and former player. He is currently the technical director of Indian Football League club Mohammedan

He is the father of Stefan Antonić, who plays football professionally in Hong Kong.

== Personal life ==
Antonić married an Indonesian woman, Venna Tikoalu, on 3 July 1999. Their son Stefan was born on 6 February 2001 in Hong Kong. Antonić has a daughter who is living in Serbia.

== Club career ==
=== In Europe ===
Antonić started his professional football career at Red Star Belgrade. In 1987, he was called up to the 1987 FIFA World Youth Championship in Chile alongside the likes of Robert Jarni, Igor Štimac, Zvonimir Boban, Robert Prosinečki, Predrag Mijatović and Davor Šuker. After Yugoslavia won on penalties over East Germany, he returned to Red Star, but made no league appearances and left for Spartak Subotica in 1989. Then, he played for FK Napredak Kruševac in the Yugoslav Second League, as well as Belgian side Beveren.

=== Indonesia and Hong Kong ===
After leaving Europe in 1995, Antonić spent three years with three Indonesian clubs. He went to Hong Kong in 1998 to join Instant-Dict FC, became a well-known figure among fans and would then play for Rangers, Sun Hei and Kitchee before retiring in 2005. He also played at the 2003 Lunar New Year Cup, scoring a penalty against the Denmark League XI.

== Managerial career ==
Antonić, a UEFA Pro License holder, was appointed by Kitchee as head coach immediately after his retirement in 2005 and successfully led the team to two trophies in the league on his first year of duty, winning the Hong Kong League Cup and Hong Kong Senior Shield Cup. He led the team to defend their Hong Kong League Cup in 2006, during his second year of duty. Kitchee also qualified for the 2008 AFC Cup.

Antonić was elected as the 2006 Hong Kong Coach of The Year and also appointed to be a coach of Hong Kong League XI for the annual Carlsberg Cup.

=== Achievements with Kitchee FC ===
- Winner of Hong Kong League Cup 2005-2006
- Winner of the Senior Shield Cup 2005-2006
- Winner of Hong Kong League Cup 2006-2007
- Kitchee qualify for 2008 AFC Cup
- Elected as Hong Kong "Coach of the Year 2005-2006“
- Won the 2nd Place of Hong Kong League 2006-2007
- Won the 2nd Place of Senior Shield Cup 2007-2008

Antonić was appointed to coach the Hong Kong national football team in preparation for the 2011 Asian Cup qualifiers. And with Hong Kong National Team, he won the 31st Guangdong Cup 2008. He has been nominated as a consultant of the Hong Kong Law Society Football Team.

He left his post as head coach of Tuen Mun in the middle of the 2011–12 Hong Kong First Division League season and joined Arema FC as their manager. Coaching Arema FC for only 6 months and he was voted by the soccer news website, Goal.com, as "The Best Coach 2011–2012" of the Indonesian Premier League as he brought Arema FC to go through to the quarter-final of AFC Cup 2012 and make the country proud.

=== Achievements with Arema Indonesia FC ===
- Voted as “The Best Coach of Indonesian Premier League 2011-2012”

(http://www.goal.com/id-ID/news/2980/indonesian-premier-league/2012/07/28/3269769/spesial-pelatih-pemain-terbaik-indonesian-premier-league)

- Voted as “Coach of The Month” (May 2012) by the AFC

=== Achievements with Pro Duta FC ===
- Champion of the Indonesian Premier League 2012-2013
- Champion of the Indonesian Premier League Super Cup 2012-2013
- Voted as “Indonesian Coach of the Year” 2012-2013 On 9 September 2014, he got his contract extended until 2016.

=== Achievements with Pelita Bandung Raya FC ===
- Voted as “The Coach of the Month” in February 2014
- Voted as “The Coach of the Month” in August 2014
- Voted as “The Coach of the Month” in October 2014
- Voted as “Coach of the Year”, Indonesian Super League 2014-2015 by PSSI
- Voted as “Coach of the Year”, Indonesian Super League by Goal.com
- Voted as “Coach of the Year”, Indonesian Super League by ESPN
- Pelita Bandung Raya FC was voted as “Team of the Year, Indonesian Super League 2014-2015”
- Pelita Bandung Raya FC won the Runner-up in Bali Island Cup 2014-2015

=== Achievements with Persib Bandung FC ===
- Won the 2nd Place of Bhayangkara Cup 2016

Antonić returned to management on 31 October 2016, signing a 1.5 year contract at South China as manager. The club managed to finish 4th in the league and reached the finals of the 2016-17 Hong Kong FA Cup. Following South China's decision to voluntarily relegate, the contracts of the entire coaching staff were terminated.

On 4 July 2017, Hong Kong Rangers Director Philip Lee announced that Antonić would be the club's new manager.

On 28 March 2018, Borneo announced that Antonić would be the club's new head coach after sacked their previous head coach

== Games of Hong Kong team coached by Dejan Antonić and Goran Paulić ==
=== International games of Hong Kong ===
#	Date	Type of Match	Location	Opponent	Result
1	19 November 2008	Friendly	Macau	Macau	9–1
2	14 January 2009	Friendly	Hong Kong	India	2–1
3	21 January 2009	2011 AFC Asian Cup qualification	Hong Kong	Bahrain	1–3
4	28 January 2009	2011 AFC Asian Cup qualification	Sana'a, Yemen	Yemen	0–1

=== Non-international games of Hong Kong ===
#	Date	Type of Match	Location	Opponent	Result
1	1 January 2009	2009 Guangdong–Hong Kong Cup	Guangzhou, China	(China) Guangdong	1–3
2	4 January 2009	2009 Guangdong–Hong Kong Cup	Hong Kong	(China) Guangdong	4–1

== Managerial statistics ==
As of 5 March 2026

Managerial record by team and tenure
Team	Nat.	From	To	Record					Ref.
Team	Nat.	From	To	G	W	D	L	Win %	Ref.
Kitchee	(Hong Kong)	1 July 2005	31 December 2007	64	38	14	12	59.38	
Hong Kong	(Hong Kong)	14 October 2008	30 June 2009	4	2	0	2	50.00	
Pegasus	(Hong Kong)	1 July 2009	30 November 2009	5	3	1	1	60.00	
Shatin	(Hong Kong)	1 January 2010	30 June 2010	12	2	7	3	16.67	
Taichung	(Chinese Taipei)	1 July 2010	30 April 2011	20	3	3	14	15.00	
Tuen Mun	(Hong Kong)	1 August 2011	29 November 2011	10	4	3	3	40.00	
Persib Bandung	(Indonesia)	20 January 2016	11 June 2016	6	1	4	1	16.67	
South China	(Hong Kong)	31 October 2016	30 June 2017	20	12	0	8	60.00	
Rangers	(Hong Kong)	1 July 2017	3 December 2017	9	3	1	5	33.33	
Borneo	(Indonesia)	28 March 2018	4 January 2019	33	14	5	14	42.42	
Madura United	(Indonesia)	13 January 2019	23 August 2019	26	13	7	6	50.00	
PSS Sleman	(Indonesia)	26 February 2020	19 December 2021	28	9	9	10	32.14	
Barito Putera	(Indonesia)	22 April 2022	25 August 2022	10	2	3	5	20.00	
Jinan Xingzhou	(China)	1 August 2023	5 November 2023	9	3	3	3	33.33	
Foshan Nanshi	(China)	30 November 2023	24 April 2024	7	0	5	2	0.00	
Semen Padang	(Indonesia)	21 October 2025	5 March 2026	16	3	4	9	18.75	
Career Total				279	112	69	98	40.14	

== Honours ==
=== Player ===
Sun Hei

- Hong Kong FA Cup: 2002–03
- Hong Kong League Cup: 2002–03

Yugoslavia U-20

- FIFA World Youth Championship: 1987

=== Manager ===
Kitchee

- Hong Kong Senior Shield: 2005–06
- Hong Kong League Cup: 2005–06, 2006–07

PSS Sleman

- Menpora Cup third place: 2021
