= Hong Kong national football team results (unofficial matches) =

- Win Draw Loss

This is a list of the Hong Kong national football team results from 1952 to the present day that, for various reasons, are not accorded the status of official internationals.

== 1950s ==
2 June 1954 International friendly	Hong Kong	2–2	Taiwan	British Hong Kong

14 May 1958 International friendly	Hong Kong	2–1	Taiwan	British Hong Kong

3 April 1959 1960 AFC Asian Cup; Qualification Eastern Zone	Taiwan	7–4	Hong Kong	Manila, Philippines
				Stadium: Rizal Memorial Stadium; Attendance: 22,000

22 August 1959 International friendly	Hong Kong	1–3	Taiwan	British Hong Kong

== 1960s ==
8 August 1961 1961 Merdeka Tournament; Group B	South Korea XI	1–1	Hong Kong	Kuala Lumpur, Malaya

25 May 1967 International Friendly	Hong Kong	1–4	Scotland XI	Hong Kong Island
	Wills	Report 1 Report 2	Hood; Ferguson; W. Callaghan	Stadium: Hong Kong Stadium; Attendance: 7,000

== 1970s ==
7 February 1978 International Friendly	Hong Kong	1–4	China	British Hong Kong

11 June 1978 40th HK–Macau Interport	Macau	0–4	Hong Kong	Portuguese Macau

== 1980s ==
1 June 1980 42nd HK–Macau Interport	Macau	0–2	Hong Kong	Portuguese Macau

30 November 1980 International Friendly	Indonesia	4–0	Hong Kong	Jakarta, Indonesia

24 June 1981 43rd HK–Macau Interport	Hong Kong	3–1	Macau	British Hong Kong

9 May 1982 44th HK–Macau Interport	Macau	1–0	Hong Kong	Portuguese Macau

1 July 1983 45th HK–Macau Interport	Hong Kong	1–0	Macau	British Hong Kong

17 June 1984 46th HK–Macau Interport	Macau	0–3	Hong Kong	Portuguese Macau

6 August 1985 International Friendly	Thailand	1–2	Hong Kong	Bangkok, Thailand

== 1990s ==
1 March 1998 1998 Dynasty Cup	China	1–0	Hong Kong	Yokohama, Japan
	Zhang Enhua 59'			Stadium: International Stadium Yokohama; Attendance: 40,000; Referee: Masayoshi Okada (Japan)

4 March 1998 1998 Dynasty Cup	Japan	5–1	Hong Kong	Yokohama, Japan
	Nakata 26', 36' (pen.); Masuda 40'; Nanami 71'; Lopes 85'		34' Tempest	Stadium: International Stadium Yokohama; Attendance: 50,743; Referee: Abdul Rahman Al-Zeid (Saudi Arabia)

7 March 1998 1998 Dynasty Cup	South Korea	1–0	Hong Kong	Tokyo, Japan
	Choi Yong-Soo 90+'			Stadium: National Stadium; Attendance: 27,668; Referee: Masayoshi Okada (Japan)

== 2000s ==
9 January 2000 International Friendly	Hong Kong	1–3	Uruguay	Hong Kong

14 January 2001 Millennium Super Soccer Cup	Romania	4–2	Hong Kong	Margao, India
15:30 UTC+5:30	Liviu Zahariu 4'; Sasu 23'; Sânmărtean 59'; Ioan Luca 63'	Report	Kwok Yue Hung 22', 45'	Stadium: Fatorda Stadium; Referee: A. M. Yapa (Sri Lanka)

16 January 2001 Millennium Super Soccer Cup	Jordan	2–0	Hong Kong	Margao, India
17:00 UTC+5:30	Al-Shaqran 49'; Al-Shboul 84'	Report		Stadium: Fatorda Stadium

== 2010s ==
1 January 2011 33rd Guangdong–Hong Kong Cup; 1st Leg	Guangdong	3–1	Hong Kong	Guangzhou, Guangdong
15:00 UTC+8	Li Jianhua 6'; Yuan Lin 10'; Shi Liang (yellow card) 36'; Huang Fengtao 70'	Report	(yellow card) 36' Lee Chi Ho; (yellow card) 45' Bai He; (yellow card) 45' Chan Siu Ki; 51' Lo Kwan Yee; (yellow card) 59' Kwok Kin Pong; (yellow card) 63' Sham Kwok Fai; (yellow card) 67' Cheng Lai Hin	Stadium: Guangdong People's Stadium; Attendance: 8,000; Referee: He Zhibiao (China PR)

4 January 2011 33rd Guangdong–Hong Kong Cup; 2nd Leg	Hong Kong	0–0 (1–3 agg.)	Guangdong	So Kon Po, Hong Kong
20:00 UTC+8	Sham Kwok Fai (yellow card) 18'; Lo Kwan Yee (yellow card) 22'; Sham Kwok Keung (yellow card) 59'	Report	(yellow card) 45+' Li Jian	Stadium: Hong Kong Stadium; Attendance: 3,175; Referee: Liu Kwok Man (Hong Kong)

28 December 2011 34th Guangdong–Hong Kong Cup; 1st Leg	Hong Kong	2–2	Guangdong	So Kon Po, Hong Kong
20:00 UTC+8	Cheng Siu Wai 64'; Godfred 74'; Man Pei Tak (yellow card) 90+'	Report	Tan Binliang 27'; Ge Zhen (yellow card) 45'; Huang Fengtao 90+'; Yin Hongbo (yellow card) 90+'	Stadium: Hong Kong Stadium; Attendance: 4,165; Referee: Tong Kui Sum; Assistant referees: Chan Shui Hung; Chow Chun Kit; Fourth official: Liu Kwok Man

1 January 2012 34th Guangdong–Hong Kong Cup; 2nd Leg	Guangdong	0–0 (a.e.t.) (2–2 agg.) (4–5 p)	Hong Kong	Huizhou, Guangdong
15:00 UTC+8		Report	(yellow card) 12' Sealy; (yellow card) 53' Lee Chi Ho; (yellow card) 120+' Godfred	Stadium: Huizhou Olympic Stadium; Attendance: 30,000; Referee: Sun Bing (China PR)
	Penalties
	Yin Hongbo (penalty missed); Li Yan (penalty scored); Zhao Huang (penalty scored); Li Jianhua (penalty missed); Huang Fengtao (penalty scored); Chang Feiya (penalty scored); Ge Zhen (penalty missed)		(penalty scored) Lo Kwan Yee; (penalty missed) Lee Chi Ho; (penalty missed) Leung Chun Pong; (penalty scored) Cheung Kin Fung; (penalty scored) Chan Wai Ho; (penalty scored) Man Pei Tak; (penalty scored) Lam Ka Wai

29 December 2012 35th Guangdong–Hong Kong Cup; 1st Leg	Guangdong	1–0	Hong Kong	Huizhou, Guangdong
15:00(GMT+8)	Lu Lin (yellow card) 45'; Yin Hongbo 88' (pen.)	Report	(yellow card) 16' Fofo	Stadium: Huizhou Olympic Stadium; Referee: Chen Honghui (China PR)

1 January 2013 35th Guangdong–Hong Kong Cup; 2nd Leg	Hong Kong	2–1 (2–2 agg.) (9–8 p)	Guangdong	Mong Kok, Hong Kong
15:00 UTC+8	Bai He 35'; Lee Wai Lim 73'; Campion (yellow card) 82'	Report	Huang Fengtao (yellow card) 37'; Rao Weihui (yellow card) 57'; Shi Liang 66'; Pan Jia (yellow card) 95'	Stadium: Mong Kok Stadium; Attendance: 4,587; Referee: Liu Kwok Man (Hong Kong)
	Penalties
	Roy Moore (penalty scored); Cheung Kin Fung (penalty scored); Lam Hok Hei (penalty scored); Lee Wai Lim (penalty scored); Bai He (penalty scored); Kwok Kin Pong (penalty scored); McKee (penalty scored); Man Pei Tak (penalty scored); Fofo (penalty scored)		(penalty scored) Yin Hongbo; (penalty scored) Huang Fengtao; (penalty scored) Rao Weihui; (penalty scored) Liao Junjian; (penalty scored) Pan Jia; (penalty scored) Chang Feiya; (penalty scored) Huang Haoxuan; (penalty scored) Guo Zichao; (penalty missed) Shi Liang

23 January 2013 Exhibition match	Hong Kong	0–3	(Hong Kong) Kitchee	Lam Tin, Hong Kong
09:30 UTC+8			Couñago (pen.); Spitz; Wong Tsz Chun	Stadium: Sai Tso Wan Recreation Ground; Attendance: Close-Door Match

5 March 2013 Exhibition match	Hong Kong	2–2	(Hong Kong) Sun Pegasus	Happy Valley, Hong Kong
10:00 UTC+8	Lee Hong Lim; Lee Wai Lim		Karalic	Stadium: HKFC Stadium; Attendance: Close-Door Match

9 May 2013 Exhibition match	Hong Kong	0–2	(Hong Kong) Southern	Lam Tin, Hong Kong
17:30 UTC+8			38' Carril; 55' Ng Siu Fai	Stadium: Sai Tso Wan Recreation Ground; Attendance: Close-Door Match

14 May 2013 Exhibition match	Hong Kong	1–6	(Hong Kong) Sun Pegasus	So Kon Po, Hong Kong
10:00 UTC+8	To Hon To		Karalic; Miović; Xu Deshuai; Tong Kin Man; Chan Pak Hang	Stadium: So Kon Po Recreation Ground; Attendance: Close-Door Match

29 May 2013 Exhibition match	Hong Kong	2–2	Hong Kong U-23	Chai Wan, Hong Kong
10:00 UTC+8	Chan Wai Ho; Chan Man Fai		James Ha	Stadium: Siu Sai Wan Sports Ground; Attendance: Close-Door Match

31 May 2013 Exhibition match	Hong Kong	5–2	Hong Kong U-23	Tseung Kwan O, King Kong
10:00 UTC+8	Lo Kwan Yee; Jaimes McKee; Lee Wai Lim; Lam Ka Wai; To Hon To		Goal	Stadium: Tseung Kwan O Sports Ground; Attendance: Close-Door Match

6 September 2013 Exhibition match	Myanmar	0–0	Hong Kong	Yangon, Myanmar
17:00 UTC+6:30

14 November 2015 2015 Hong Kong–Macau Interport	Hong Kong	2–0	Macau	Siu Sai Wan, Hong Kong
15:00 UTC+8	Hui Ka Lok 64'; Chan Siu Kwan 80'			Stadium: Siu Sai Wan Sports Ground; Attendance: 1,318; Referee: Lau Fong Hei (Hong Kong)

31 December 2015 38th Guangdong–Hong Kong Cup; 1st Leg	Hong Kong	1–1	Guangdong	Mong Kok, Hong Kong
20:00 UTC+8	Tan Chun Lok 39'	Report	Cai Jingyuan 25'	Stadium: Mong Kok Stadium; Attendance: 4,273; Referee: Chan Ming Siu

3 January 2016 38th Guangdong–Hong Kong Cup; 2nd Leg	Guangdong	4–3 (5–4 agg.)	Hong Kong	Guangzhou, Guangdong
15:30 UTC+8	Lu Lin 37' (pen.), 85'; Ye Chugui 54'; Tu Dongxu 56'	Report	Cheung Chi Yung 21'; Tam Lok Hin 33'; Itaparica 48' (pen.)	Stadium: Guangdong Provincial People's Stadium; Referee: Tan Hai

9 February 2016 2016 Lunar New Year Cup	Hong Kong	0–4	Hong Kong League XI	Mong Kok, Hong Kong
16:00 UTC+8		Report	Fukuda 20'; Dhiego 35'; Fernando 60'; Adrović 80'	Stadium: Mong Kok Stadium; Attendance: 6,296; Referee: Lau Fong Hei

1 January 2017 39th Guangdong–HK Cup; 1st Leg	Guangdong	3–2	Hong Kong	Guangzhou, Guangdong
15:30 UTC+8	Liao Junjian 16'; Zeng Chao 29'; Liang Xueming 80'; Yu Jianfeng (yellow card) 90+3'	Report	Tan Chun Lok 24'; Li Ngai Hoi (yellow card) 63'; Lai Lok Yin 66'; Wong Tsz Ho (yellow card) 90+1'	Stadium: Guangdong Provincial People's Stadium; Referee: Wang Di (China PR)

4 January 2017 39th Guangdong–Hong Kong Cup; 2nd Leg	Hong Kong	1–1	Guangdong	So Kon Po, Hong Kong
20:00 UTC+8	Wong Tsz Ho 21'; Li Ngai Hoi (yellow card) 73'; Ngan Lok Fung (yellow card) 77'	Report	Wang Song 66'; Chen Zhizhao (yellow card) 67'; Liao Junjian (yellow card) 73'	Stadium: Hong Kong Stadium; Attendance: 4,272; Referee: Lau Fong Hei (Hong Kong)

4 January 2018 40th Guangdong–Hong Kong Cup; 1st Leg	Hong Kong	2–0	Guangdong	So Kon Po, Hong Kong
20:00 UTC+8	Cheung Chi Yung 79'; Chuck Yiu Kwok 90+2'	Report	Tu Dongxu (yellow card) 26'; Zhu Haiwei (yellow card) 78'; Lin Juyuan (yellow card) 84'; Hu Weiwei (yellow card) 89'	Stadium: Hong Kong Stadium; Attendance: 5,341; Referee: Ng Chiu Kok (Hong Kong)

7 January 2018 40th Guangdong–Hong Kong Cup; 2nd Leg	Guangdong	2–0 (a.e.t.) (2–4 p)	Hong Kong	Guangzhou, Guangdong
15:30 UTC+8	Lu Lin 40' (pen.); Chak Ting Fung 68' (o.g.); Lu Lin (yellow card) 103'; Chen Zhizhao (yellow card) 105'; Tu Dongxu (yellow card) 108'	Report	Yuen Ho Chun (yellow card) 54'; Leung Kwun Chung (yellow card) 67'; Michael Luk (yellow card) 70'; Wong Tsz Ho (yellow card) 90+5'	Stadium: Guangdong Provincial People's Stadium; Referee: Ai Kun (China PR)
	Penalties
	Lu Lin (penalty missed); Xiao Zhi (penalty scored); Yang Chaosheng (penalty missed); Liang Xueming (penalty scored)		(penalty scored) Leung Kwun Chung; (penalty missed) Chuck Yiu Kwok; (penalty scored) Li Ngai Hoi; (penalty scored) Wong Tsz Ho; (penalty scored) Tse Long Hin

6 January 2019 41st Guangdong–Hong Kong Cup; 1st Leg	Guangdong	2–1	Hong Kong	Guangzhou, Guangdong
15:30 UTC+8	Lu Lin 45+3' (pen.); Chen Zijie 50'	Report	Lam 90+1'	Stadium: Guangdong Provincial People's Stadium; Referee: Li Haixin (China PR)

9 January 2019 41st Guangdong–Hong Kong Cup; 2nd Leg	Hong Kong	4–0	Guangdong	So Kon Po, Hong Kong
20:00 UTC+8	Matt Orr 22'; Leung Nok Hang 50'; Yuen Chun Sing 56' (pen.); Yue Tze Nam 71'	Report		Stadium: Hong Kong Stadium; Attendance: 4,096; Referee: Tam Ping Wun (Hong Kong)

== 2020s ==
24 May 2022 Unofficial Friendly	Hong Kong	0–0	Myanmar	Thailand
16:00 UTC+7

27 May 2022 Unoifficial Friendly	Thailand U23	0–1	Hong Kong	Thailand
21:00 UTC+7

4 January 2024 Training match	Hong Kong	1–2	Tajikistan	Abu Dhabi, United Arab Emirates
17:00 UTC+5	Camargo 33'	Report	Soirov 25'; Samiev 51'	Stadium: Zayed Cricket Training Centre; Attendance: 0

10 January 2024 Training match	Saudi Arabia	2–0	Hong Kong	Al Wakrah, Qatar
18:30 UTC+3	Ghareeb 21' (pen.); Al-Sqoor 86'			Stadium: Al Janoub Stadium

31 January 2024 42nd Guangdong–Hong Kong Cup; 1st Leg	Hong Kong	2–0	Guangdong	Mong Kok, Hong Kong
20:00 UTC+8	Chan Siu Kwan 11'; Poon Pui Hin 52'	Report		Stadium: Mong Kok Stadium; Attendance: 5,067; Referee: Wong Wai Lun (Hong Kong)

7 February 2024 42nd Guangdong–Hong Kong Cup; 2nd Leg	Guangdong	3–1 (a.e.t.) (4–2 p)	Hong Kong	Guangzhou, Guangdong
19:30 UTC+8	Xiao Zhi 7'; Chen Zhechao 40'; Liao Junjian 66'	Report	Awal 25'	Stadium: Yuexiushan Stadium; Attendance: 7,288; Referee: Liang Songshang (China PR)
	Penalties
	Wang Shijie (penalty scored); Yin Congyao (penalty scored); Rao Weihui (penalty scored); Liao Junjian (penalty scored)		(penalty missed) Chan Hoi Pak; (penalty scored) Ng Yu Hei; (penalty missed) Yip Cheuk Man; (penalty scored) Ma Hei Wai

15 January 2025 43rd Guangdong–Hong Kong Cup; 1st Leg	Guangdong	1–1	Hong Kong	Guangzhou, Guangdong
19:30 UTC+8	Jiang Zhipeng 75' (pen.)	Report	Pereira 40'	Stadium: Yuexiushan Stadium; Referee: Li Haixin (China PR)

22 January 2025 43rd Guangdong–Hong Kong Cup; 2nd Leg	Hong Kong	1–2	Guangdong	So Kon Po, Hong Kong
20:00 UTC+8	Lau Ka Kiu 46'	Report	Behram 33'; Xia Dalong 86'	Stadium: Hong Kong Stadium; Attendance: 8,278; Referee: Wong Po Sing (Hong Kong)

30 May 2025 Non-official friendly	Hong Kong	1–3	(England) Manchester United	So Kon Po, Hong Kong
20:00 UTC+8	Juninho 19'	Report	Obi 40', 82'; Heaven 90+4'	Stadium: Hong Kong Stadium; Attendance: 33,098; Referee: Ho Wai Sing

28 December 2025 44th Guangdong–Hong Kong Cup; 1st Leg	Hong Kong	2–2	Guangdong	So Kon Po, Hong Kong
20:00 UTC+8	Sun Ming Him 41'; Everton 67' (pen.)	Report	Chen Wei 54'; Jiang Zhipeng 61'	Stadium: Hong Kong Stadium; Attendance: 7,703; Referee: Cheung Wai Lung

3 January 2026 44th Guangdong–Hong Kong Cup; 2nd Leg	Guangdong	2–2 (4–3 p)	Hong Kong	Nansha, Guangdong
16:30 UTC+8	Jiang Zhipeng 16' (pen.); Yi Xianlong 35'	Report	Sun Ming Him 61'; Wong Wai 80'	Stadium: Greater Bay Area Sports Center
	Penalties
	Jiang Zhipeng (penalty scored); Hou Yu (penalty scored); Li Lehang (penalty scored); Hai Jieqing (penalty scored)		(penalty scored) Udebuluzor; (penalty scored) Lau Ka Kiu; (penalty missed) Dudu; (penalty scored) Ngan Cheuk Pan; (penalty missed) Wong Wai

19 February 2026 2026 Lunar New Year Cup	Hong Kong	1–1 (5–4 p)	(South Korea) FC Seoul	Hong Kong Stadium, Hong Kong
15:00 UTC+8		Report		Attendance: 14,089; Referee: Wong Wai Lun
