= 35th Guangdong–Hong Kong Cup =

35th Guangdong-Hong Kong Cup
- Event: Guangdong-Hong Kong Cup
Guangdong	Hong Kong
2	2
- Hong Kong won 9–8 on penalties

First leg
Guangdong	Hong Kong
1	0
- Date: 29 December 2012
- Venue: Huizhou Olympic Stadium, Huizhou
- Referee: Chen Honghui (China PR)
- Weather: Partly cloudy 12 °C (54 °F); 89% humidity

Second leg
Hong Kong	Guangdong
2	1
- Date: 1 January 2013
- Venue: Mong Kok Stadium, Mong Kok
- Referee: Liu Kwok Man (Hong Kong)
- Attendance: 4,587
- Weather: Cloudy and dry 16 °C (61 °F); 41% humidity

The 35th Guangdong-Hong Kong Cup will be held on 29 December 2012 and 1 January 2013. The first leg will be played at Huizhou Olympic Stadium with the second leg to take place at Hong Kong Stadium.

Both Hong Kong and Guangdong were not able to win the Guangdong–Hong Kong Cup after 90 minutes of first leg game and 120 minutes of second leg, which include 30 minutes of extra time. The game ended in 2–2 in aggregate. Hong Kong won 9–8 on penalty shoot-out.

== Squads ==
=== Guangdong ===
- Head Coach: (China) Cao Yang

No.	Pos.	Player	Date of birth (age)	Caps	Club
1	GK	Li Weijun	1 December 1981 (aged 31)		(China) Guangdong Sunray Cave
4	DF	Guo Zichao	25 January 1989 (aged 23)		(China) Guangdong Sunray Cave
5	DF	Yuan Lin	26 February 1977 (aged 35)		(China) Shenzhen Fengpeng
6	MF	Li Yan	19 July 1984 (aged 28)		(China) Guangzhou R&F
7	MF	Huang Long	8 January 1993 (aged 19)		(China) Guangdong Sunray Cave
8	DF	Chen Jianlong	8 January 1993 (aged 19)		(China) Nanchang Hengyuan
9	FW	Huang Haoxuan	15 January 1994 (aged 18)		(China) Guangdong U-19
10	FW	Huang Fengtao	17 June 1985 (aged 26)		(China) Shenzhen Ruby
11	FW	Chang Feiya	3 February 1993 (aged 19)		(China) Guangdong U-19
13	FW	Shi Liang	11 May 1989 (aged 23)		(China) Guangdong Sunray Cave
14	MF	Tan Binliang	4 November 1989 (aged 23)		(China) Guangdong Sunray Cave
16	MF	Li Jian	1 March 1989 (aged 23)		(China) Guangdong Sunray Cave
17	MF	Yu Jianfeng	29 January 1989 (aged 23)		(China) Guangdong Sunray Cave
18	MF	Yin Hongbo	30 October 1989 (aged 23)		(China) Guangdong Sunray Cave
20	DF	Zhu Cong	8 February 1985 (aged 27)		(China) Guangdong Sunray Cave
22	GK	Hou Yu	20 December 1990 (aged 22)		(China) Guangdong Sunray Cave
23	MF	Lu Lin	3 February 1985 (aged 27)		(China) Guangzhou R&F
24	MF	Yang Bin	3 October 1991 (aged 21)		(China) Guangdong Sunray Cave
25	MF	Pan Jia	1 October 1989 (aged 23)		(China) Guangdong Sunray Cave
28	DF	Rao Weihui	25 March 1989 (aged 23)		(China) Guizhou Renhe
35	FW	Liao Junjian	27 January 1994 (aged 18)		(China) Guangdong Sunray Cave

=== Hong Kong ===
- Deputy Head Coach: Kim Pan-Gon
- Assistant coach: Szeto Man Chun

No.	Pos.	Player	Date of birth (age)	Caps	Club
1	GK	Yapp Hung Fai	21 March 1990 (aged 22)	20	(Hong Kong) South China
2	DF	Wisdom Fofo Agbo	25 June 1979 (aged 33)	0	(Hong Kong) Southern
3	DF	Man Pei Tak	16 February 1982 (aged 30)	38	(Hong Kong) South China
4	MF	Bai He	19 November 1983 (aged 29)	18	(Hong Kong) South China
5	DF	Sean Tse	3 May 1992 (aged 20)	0	(Hong Kong) South China
6	FW	Cheng Siu Wai	27 December 1981 (aged 31)	15	(Hong Kong) Kitchee
7	FW	Chan Siu Ki	14 July 1985 (aged 27)	45	(China) Guangdong Sunray Cave
9	MF	Lee Wai Lim	5 May 1981 (aged 31)	22	(Hong Kong) South China
11	FW	Lam Hok Hei	18 September 1991 (aged 21)	8	(Hong Kong) Biu Chun Rangers
13	DF	Cheung Kin Fung	1 January 1984 (aged 28)	8	(Hong Kong) Sunray Cave JC Sun Hei
14	FW	Sham Kwok Keung	5 June 1985 (aged 27)	21	(Hong Kong) Citizen
15	DF	Chan Wai Ho	24 April 1982 (aged 30)	54	(Hong Kong) South China
16	MF	Leung Chun Pong	1 October 1986 (aged 26)	32	(China) Guangdong Sunray Cave
19	GK	Leung Hing Kit	22 October 1989 (aged 23)	1	(Hong Kong) Biu Chun Rangers
21	DF	Kwok Kin Pong	30 March 1987 (aged 25)	19	(Hong Kong) Kitchee
22	MF	Michael Campion	20 May 1984 (aged 28)	0	(Hong Kong) Citizen
23	MF	Chu Siu Kei	11 January 1980 (aged 32)	42	(Hong Kong) Kitchee
24	DF	Jack Sealy	4 May 1987 (aged 25)	0	(Hong Kong) South China
25	FW	Jaimes McKee	14 April 1987 (aged 25)	5	(Hong Kong) Sun Pegasus
29	FW	James Ha	26 December 1992 (aged 20)	0	(Hong Kong) Kitchee

== Match details ==
=== First leg ===
29 December 2012 First Leg	Guangdong	1 – 0	Hong Kong	Huizhou, China
15:00 CST	Yin Hongbo 88' (pen.)	Report		Stadium: Huizhou Olympic Stadium; Referee: Chen Honghui (China PR)

=== Second leg ===
1 January 2013 Second Leg	Hong Kong	2 – 1 (a.e.t.) (9 – 8 p)	Guangdong	Mong Kok, Hong Kong
15:00 CST	Bai He 35'; Lee Wai Lim 73'	Report	66' Shi Liang	Stadium: Mong Kok Stadium; Attendance: 4,587; Referee: Liu Kwok Man (Hong Kong)
	Penalties
	Chan Siu Ki (penalty scored); Cheung Kin Fung (penalty scored); Lam Hok Hei (penalty scored); Lee Wai Lim (penalty scored); Bai He (penalty scored); Kwok Kin Pong (penalty scored); McKee (penalty scored); Man Pei Tak (penalty scored); Fofo (penalty scored)		(penalty scored) Yin Hongbo; (penalty scored) Huang Fengtao; (penalty scored) Rao Weihui; (penalty scored) Liao Junjian; (penalty scored) Pan Jia; (penalty scored) Chang Feiya; (penalty scored) Huang Haoxuan; (penalty scored) Guo Zichao; (penalty missed) Shi Liang
