= Hong Kong–Macau Interport =

Hong Kong–Macau Interport (Chinese: 港澳埠際足球賽) is an annual association football match between Hong Kong and Macau national teams. The matches are hosted by the two alternatively each year.

== Results ==
No.	Year	Home team	Score	Away team	Notes
1	1937	Macau	2 – 1	Hong Kong	Hong Kong team was formed entirely by Second Division League players.
2	1938	Hong Kong	3 – 5	Macau	Hong Kong team was formed entirely by Second Division League players.
3	1939	Macau	0 – 2	Hong Kong	
4	1940	Hong Kong	6 – 3	Macau	
5	1941	Macau	1 – 0	Hong Kong	
-	1942-46	Not held			
6	1947	Hong Kong	3 – 2	Macau	
7	1948	Macau	4 – 2	Hong Kong	
8	1949	Hong Kong	7 – 0	Macau	
9	1950	Macau	1 – 2	Hong Kong	
10	1951	Hong Kong	2 – 0	Macau	
11	1952	Macau	3 – 0	Hong Kong	
12	1953	Hong Kong	4 – 1	Macau	Hong Kong was represented by Hong Kong League XI.
13	1954	Macau	3 – 2	Hong Kong	
14	1955	Hong Kong	7 – 3	Macau	Hong Kong was represented by Hong Kong League XI.
15	1956	Macau	3 – 5	Hong Kong	Hong Kong was represented by Hong Kong League XI.
16	1957	Hong Kong	7 – 2	Macau	Hong Kong was represented by Hong Kong League XI.
17	1958	Macau	1 – 3	Hong Kong	Hong Kong was represented by Hong Kong League XI.
18	1959	Hong Kong	3 – 1	Macau	Hong Kong was represented by its B-team due to the clash with 1960 AFC Asian Cup qualification.
19	1960	Macau	0 – 3	Hong Kong	
20	1961	Hong Kong	7 – 1	Macau	Hong Kong was represented by Hong Kong League XI.
-	1962	Not held			
21	1963	Macau	3 – 4	Hong Kong	Hong Kong was represented by Hong Kong League XI.
22	1964	Hong Kong	3 – 1	Macau	
23	1965	Macau	1 – 2	Hong Kong	
24	1966	Hong Kong	4 – 1	Macau	
-	1967	Not held			
25	1968	Macau	2 – 2	Hong Kong	
26	1969	Hong Kong	5 – 0	Macau	Hong Kong was represented by its youth team.
27	1970	Macau	3 – 1	Hong Kong	Hong Kong was represented by its U-12 team.
28	1971	Hong Kong	3 – 1	Macau	
29	1972	Macau	1 – 5	Hong Kong	
30	1973	Hong Kong	1 – 0	Macau	Hong Kong was represented by its B-team due to the clash with 1974 FIFA World Cup qualification.
31	1974	Macau	2 – 3	Hong Kong	
32	1975	Hong Kong	7 – 0	Macau	
33	1976	Macau	0 – 2	Hong Kong	
34	1977	Hong Kong	2 – 0	Macau	
35	1978	Macau	0 – 4	Hong Kong	
36	1979	Hong Kong	5 – 0	Macau	Hong Kong was represented by its B team due to the clash to the 1980 AFC Asian Cup qualification.
37	1980	Macau	0 – 2	Hong Kong	
38	1981	Hong Kong	3 – 1	Macau	
39	1982	Macau	1 – 0	Hong Kong	
40	1983	Hong Kong	1 – 0	Macau	
41	1984	Macau	0 – 3	Hong Kong	
42	1985	Hong Kong	2 – 0	Macau	
43	1986	Macau	2 – 3	Hong Kong	Hong Kong was represented by its B team due to the friendly match with Coventry City F.C. a day before
44	1987	Hong Kong	5 – 0	Macau	
45	1988	Macau	0 – 4	Hong Kong	
46	1989	Hong Kong	2 – 1	Macau	
47	1990	Macau	1 – 1	Hong Kong	Hong Kong was represented by its Olympic team.
48	1991	Hong Kong	5 – 0	Macau	Hong Kong was represented by its Olympic team.
49	1992	Macau	1 – 2	Hong Kong	Hong Kong was represented by its B team due to the clash with friendly match in Toronto.
50	1993	Hong Kong	3 – 2	Macau	
51	1994	Macau	2 – 1	Hong Kong	Hong Kong was represented by its B team.
52	1995	Hong Kong	1 – 2	Macau	Hong Kong was represented by its Olympic team.
53	1996	Macau	0 – 0	Hong Kong	
54	1997	Hong Kong	0 – 1	Macau	Hong Kong was represented by its B team due to the clash with 1998 FIFA World Cup qualification.
-	1998	Not held			
55	1999	Hong Kong	2 – 1	Macau	Hong Kong was represented by its Olympic team.
56	2000	Macau	0 – 1	Hong Kong	
57	2001	Hong Kong	3 – 0	Macau	Hong Kong was represented by its Olympic team.
58	2002	Macau	0 – 2	Hong Kong	Hong Kong was represented by its Olympic team.
59	2003	Hong Kong	6 – 0	Macau	Postponed to May 2004 due to outbreak of SARS.
60	2004	Macau	1 – 2	Hong Kong	Hong Kong was represented by its youth team.
61	2005	Hong Kong	8 – 1	Macau	Hong Kong was represented by its youth team.
62	2006	Macau	0 – 0	Hong Kong	Hong Kong was represented by its under-23 team.
63	2007	Hong Kong	2 – 1	Macau	
64	2008	Macau	0 – 1	Hong Kong	Hong Kong was represented by its Olympic team.
65	2009	Hong Kong	5 – 1	Macau	Hong Kong was represented by its Olympic team.
66	2010	Macau	1 – 5	Hong Kong	Both Hong Kong and Macau were represented by their Olympic teams.
67	2011	Hong Kong	0 – 1	Macau	Hong Kong was represented by its under-21 B team.
68	2012	Macau	1 – 3	Hong Kong	Hong Kong was represented by its under-21 team.
69	2013	Hong Kong	3 – 0	Macau	
70	2014	Macau	1 – 3	Hong Kong	Hong Kong was represented by its under-23 team.
71	2015	Hong Kong	2 – 0	Macau	Hong Kong was represented by its B team due to the clash with 2018 FIFA World Cup qualification.
72	2016	Macau	0 – 3	Hong Kong	Hong Kong was represented by its B team due to the clash with international friendly in Cambodia.
73	2017	Hong Kong	4 – 0	Macau	Hong Kong was represented by its B team. Macau was represented by its under-18 team.
74	2018	Macau	1 – 6	Hong Kong	Hong Kong was represented by its B team.
-	2019–2023	Not held			

== Winners Table ==
Winning team	Number of times
Hong Kong	58
Macau	12
Shared	4

== The rivalry ==
=== Men's matches ===
Only full international matches.

Hong Kong wins
Macau wins
Draws

No.	Competition	Date	Home team	Result	Away team	Home scorers	Away scorers	Venue	Attendance
1	Hong Kong–Macau Interport	29 March 1948	Macau	4–2	Hong Kong	unknown	unknown	Portuguese Macau	
	Hong Kong–Macau Interport	1 June 1985	Hong Kong	2–0	Macau	Choi Wai Man (29), Mak King Fun (80)		British Hong Kong	
	1992 AFC Asian Cup qualification	3 June 1992	Hong Kong	2–2	Macau	Au Wai Lun (52), Lee Kin Wo (75)	unknown	Pyongyang, North Korea	
	1996 AFC Asian Cup qualification	1 February 1996	Hong Kong	4–1	Macau	Au Wai Lun (26), Bredbury (72, 75, 77)	José Martins (70)	Mong Kok Stadium, British Hong Kong	
	Hong Kong–Macau Interport	28 May 2000	Macau	0–1	Hong Kong		Cheng Siu Chung (86)	Macau	
	2003 East Asian Football Championship	24 February 2003	Hong Kong	3–0	Macau	Lee Kin Wo (46), Au Wai Lun (59, 62)	1,602	Hong Kong Stadium, Hong Kong	
	Friendly	3 June 2006	Macau	0–0	Hong Kong			Macau University of Science and Technology Sports Field, Macau	
	Hong Kong–Macau Interport	10 June 2007	Hong Kong	2–1	Macau	Chu Siu Kei (23), Chan Siu Ki (66)	Chan Kin Seng (39)	So Kon Po Recreation Ground, Hong Kong	
	Friendly	19 November 2008	Macau	1–9	Hong Kong	unknown	Wai Lim Lee (2, 66, 75), Cheng Siu Wai Henry (10), Chan Siu Ki (19, 45, 55, 63), Chung Au (30)	Macau University of Science and Technology Sports Field, Macau	
	2010 Long Teng Cup	10 October 2010	Macau	0–4	Hong Kong		Tam Lok Hin (38), Xu Deshuai (52), Lam Hok Hei (72, 74)	Kaohsiung National Stadium, Kaohsiung, Taiwan	1,200
	2011 Long Teng Cup	2 October 2011	Hong Kong	5–1	Macau	Sham Kwok Keung (19, 75), Chan Siu Ki (42), Wong Chin Hung (50, 81)	Leong Ka Hang (14)	Kaohsiung National Stadium, Kaohsiung, Taiwan	
	Friendly	1 September 2017	Hong Kong	4–0	Macau	Lau Ho Lam (2), M. Luk (6), Lam Hok Kei (10, 17)		Sham Shui Po Sports Ground, Hong Kong	
	Friendly	19 March 2025	Hong Kong	2–0	Macau	Jones (26), Merkies (40)		Mong Kok Stadium, Hong Kong	5,464

== See also ==
- Hong Kong national football team results – unofficial matches
