= 43rd Guangdong–Hong Kong Cup =

- Event: Guangdong–Hong Kong Cup
Guangdong	Hong Kong
3	2

First leg
Guangdong	Hong Kong
1	1
- Date: 15 January 2025
- Venue: Yuexiushan Stadium, Guangzhou, Guangdong
- Referee: Li Haixin (China PR)

Second leg
Hong Kong	Guangdong
1	2
- Date: 22 January 2025
- Venue: Hong Kong Stadium, So Kon Po, Hong Kong
- Referee: Wong Po Sing (Hong Kong)
- Attendance: 8,278

The 43rd Guangdong–Hong Kong Cup was held on 15 and 22 January 2025.

== Squads ==
=== Guangdong ===
A 23-man squad for Guangdong was announced on 7 January 2025.

- Head coach: (Italy) Christian Lattanzio

No.	Pos.	Player	Date of birth (age)	Club
1	GK	Ji Jiabao	16 September 2002 (aged 22)	(Chinese Football Association) Shenzhen Peng City
13	GK	Peng Peng	24 November 2000 (aged 24)	(Chinese Football Association) Shenzhen Peng City
14	GK	Zhao Shi	16 March 1993 (aged 31)	(Chinese Football Association) Shenzhen Peng City
2	DF	Zhang Wei	28 March 1993 (aged 31)	(Chinese Football Association) Shenzhen Peng City
4	DF	Jiang Zhipeng	6 March 1989 (aged 35)	(Chinese Football Association) Shenzhen Peng City
5	DF	Hu Ruibao	17 October 1996 (aged 28)	(Chinese Football Association) Shenzhen Peng City
15	DF	Yu Rui	11 August 1992 (aged 32)	(Chinese Football Association) Shenzhen Peng City
16	DF	Li Zhi	29 July 1993 (aged 31)	(Chinese Football Association) Shenzhen Peng City
17	DF	Chen Yuhao	28 August 2004 (aged 20)	(Chinese Football Association) Shenzhen Peng City
22	DF	Zhang Yujie	18 March 2002 (aged 22)	(Chinese Football Association) Shenzhen Peng City
23	DF	Yang Yiming	25 May 1995 (aged 29)	(Chinese Football Association) Chengdu Rongcheng
29	DF	Wang Qiao	20 February 1995 (aged 29)	(Chinese Football Association) Shenzhen Peng City
30	DF	Tian Ziyi	27 January 2001 (aged 23)	(Chinese Football Association) Meizhou Hakka
7	MF	Li Ning	20 October 2001 (aged 23)	(Chinese Football Association) Meizhou Hakka
8	MF	Zhou Dadi	18 February 1996 (aged 28)	(Chinese Football Association) Shenzhen Peng City
12	MF	Zhang Xiaobin	23 October 1993 (aged 31)	(Chinese Football Association) Shenzhen Peng City
21	MF	Nan Song	21 June 1997 (aged 27)	(Chinese Football Association) Shenzhen Peng City
28	MF	Zhang Yudong	9 September 1992 (aged 32)	(Chinese Football Association) Shenzhen Peng City
33	MF	Hou Yu	31 January 2001 (aged 23)	(Chinese Football Association) Guangzhou
9	FW	Xia Dalong	17 June 1993 (aged 31)	(Chinese Football Association) Guangdong GZ-Power
11	FW	He Shaolin	28 February 2003 (aged 21)	(Chinese Football Association) Shenzhen Peng City
27	FW	Behram Abduweli	8 March 2003 (aged 21)	(Chinese Football Association) Shenzhen Peng City
34	FW	Shahsat Hujahmat	7 July 2006 (aged 18)	(Chinese Football Association) Shenzhen Peng City

=== Hong Kong ===
A 23-man final squad for Hong Kong was announced on 21 January 2025.

- Head coach: (England) Darren Arnott

No.	Pos.	Player	Date of birth (age)	Club
1	GK	Ng Wai Him	30 June 2002 (age 23)	(Football Association of Hong Kong, China) Southern
18	GK	Pong Cheuk Hei	31 January 2004 (age 22)	(Football Association of Hong Kong, China) North District
19	GK	Chung Hoi Man	2 January 2003 (age 23)	(Football Association of Hong Kong, China) Eastern
2	DF	Clement Benhaddouche	11 May 1996 (age 30)	(Chinese Football Association) Suzhou Dongwu
3	DF	Sung Wang Ngai	2 December 2003 (age 22)	(Football Association of Hong Kong, China) Tai Po
4	DF	Yu Wai Lim	20 September 1998 (age 27)	Free agent
5	DF	Alexander Jojo	11 February 1999 (age 27)	(Football Association of Hong Kong, China) Eastern
12	DF	Chan Yun Tung	7 July 2002 (age 23)	(Football Association of Hong Kong, China) Southern
16	DF	Tsang Yi Hang	27 October 2003 (age 22)	(The Football Association) F.C. United of Manchester Reserves
17	DF	Yim Kai Cheuk	4 December 2004 (age 21)	(Football Association of Hong Kong, China) Kowloon City
23	DF	Tsang Lok To	15 July 2005 (age 20)	(United States Soccer Federation) Vermont Catamounts
6	MF	Wu Chun Ming	21 November 1997 (age 28)	(Football Association of Hong Kong, China) Lee Man
8	MF	Wong Ho Chun	2 April 2002 (age 24)	(Football Association of Hong Kong, China) Eastern
11	MF	Lau Kwan Ching	15 May 2002 (age 24)	(Football Association of Hong Kong, China) North District
14	MF	Lee Lok Him	18 April 2004 (age 22)	(Football Association of Hong Kong, China) Tai Po
20	MF	Sohgo Ichikawa	30 July 2004 (age 21)	(Football Association of Hong Kong, China) Southern
21	MF	Ho Lung Ho	18 February 2004 (age 22)	(Football Association of Hong Kong, China) Kowloon City
7	FW	Lau Chi Lok	15 October 1993 (age 32)	(Football Association of Hong Kong, China) Rangers
9	FW	Lau Ka Kiu	10 February 2002 (age 24)	(Football Association of Hong Kong, China) Lee Man
10	FW	Stefan Pereira	16 April 1988 (age 38)	(Football Association of Hong Kong, China) Southern
13	FW	Raphaël Merkies	15 April 2002 (age 24)	(Football Association of Hong Kong, China) Southern
15	FW	Mahama Awal	10 June 1991 (age 34)	(Football Association of Hong Kong, China) Southern
22	FW	Ma Hei Wai	3 February 2004 (age 22)	(Football Association of Hong Kong, China) Eastern

== Match details ==
=== First leg ===
15 January 2025
19:30 UTC+8

Guangdong	1–1	Hong Kong
Jiang Zhipeng 75' (pen.)	Report	Pereira 40'

Yuexiushan Stadium, Guangzhou, Guangdong
Referee: Li Haixin (China PR)

=== Second leg ===
22 January 2025
20:00 UTC+8

Hong Kong	1–2	Guangdong
Lau Ka Kiu 46'	Report	Behram 33'; Xia Dalong 86'

Hong Kong Stadium, So Kon Po, Hong Kong
Attendance: 8,278
Referee: Wong Po Sing (Hong Kong)
