= William Chu =

Chu Hon Ming William
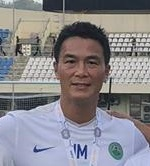

Personal information
- Full name: Chu Hon Ming William
- Date of birth: 16 July 1971 (age 55)
- Place of birth: Hong Kong
- Height: 1.83 m (6 ft 0 in)
- Position: Goalkeeper

Senior career*
Years	Team	Apps	(Gls)
1990–1991	Hap Kuan		
1992–1999	G.D. Lam Pak		
2001–2003	G.D. Os Artilheiros		
2004–2011	G.D. Lam Pak		

International career
1992–1994	Macau	1	(0)
2001–2006	Macau	8	(0)

Managerial career
- 2006–2011: Macau (Goalkeeper Coach)
- 2012–2014: C.D. Monte Carlo (Assistant)
- 2014–2016: C.D. Monte Carlo
- 2018–: Macau (Goalkeeper Coach)
- * Club domestic league appearances and goals

Chu Hon Ming William (Chinese: 朱漢明; born July 16, 1971), known as William Chu, is a Macau football player and coach. He plays as a goalkeeper for clubs Hap Kuan, G.D. Lam Pak and G.D. Os Artilheiros.

== Managerial career ==
He was appointed as the head coach of C.D. Monte Carlo from 2014 to 2016. He is currently the goalkeeper coach of Macau national team and goalkeeping instructor for the Asian Football Confederation. He holds an AFC A License and AFC Level 3 Goalkeeping License.

== Honours ==
- Macau League Championship: 8 (1992, 1994, 1997, 1998, 1999, 2006, 2007, 2009)
- Best Goalkeeper of the season, Best IX of the season (2010)

== International career ==
#	Date	Venue	Opponent	Result	Competition
1	13 June 1993	Mong Kok Stadium, Hong Kong	Hong Kong	2–3	51st Hong Kong–Macau Interport
2	21 April 2002	Lin Fong Stadium, Macau	Hong Kong	0–2	58th Hong Kong–Macau Interport
3	2 March 2003	Hong Kong Stadium, Hong Kong	Chinese Taipei	1–2	2003 EAFF Championship Preliminary
4	21 March 2003	Jalan Besar Stadium, Singapore	Pakistan	0–3	2004 AFC Asian Cup Preliminary
5	23 March 2003	Jalan Besar Stadium, Singapore	Singapore	0–2	2004 AFC Asian Cup Preliminary
6	29 May 2005	Mong Kok Stadium, Hong Kong	Hong Kong	1–8	61st Hong Kong–Macau Interport
7	2 April 2006	Bangabandhu Stadium, Dhaka, Bangladesh	Tajikistan	0–4	2006 AFC Challenge Cup
8	4 April 2006	Bangabandhu Stadium, Dhaka, Bangladesh	Pakistan	2–2	2006 AFC Challenge Cup
9	7 April 2006	Bangabandhu Stadium, Dhaka, Bangladesh	Kyrgyzstan	0–2	2006 AFC Challenge Cup
