= Chu Siu Kei =

Hong Kong footballer

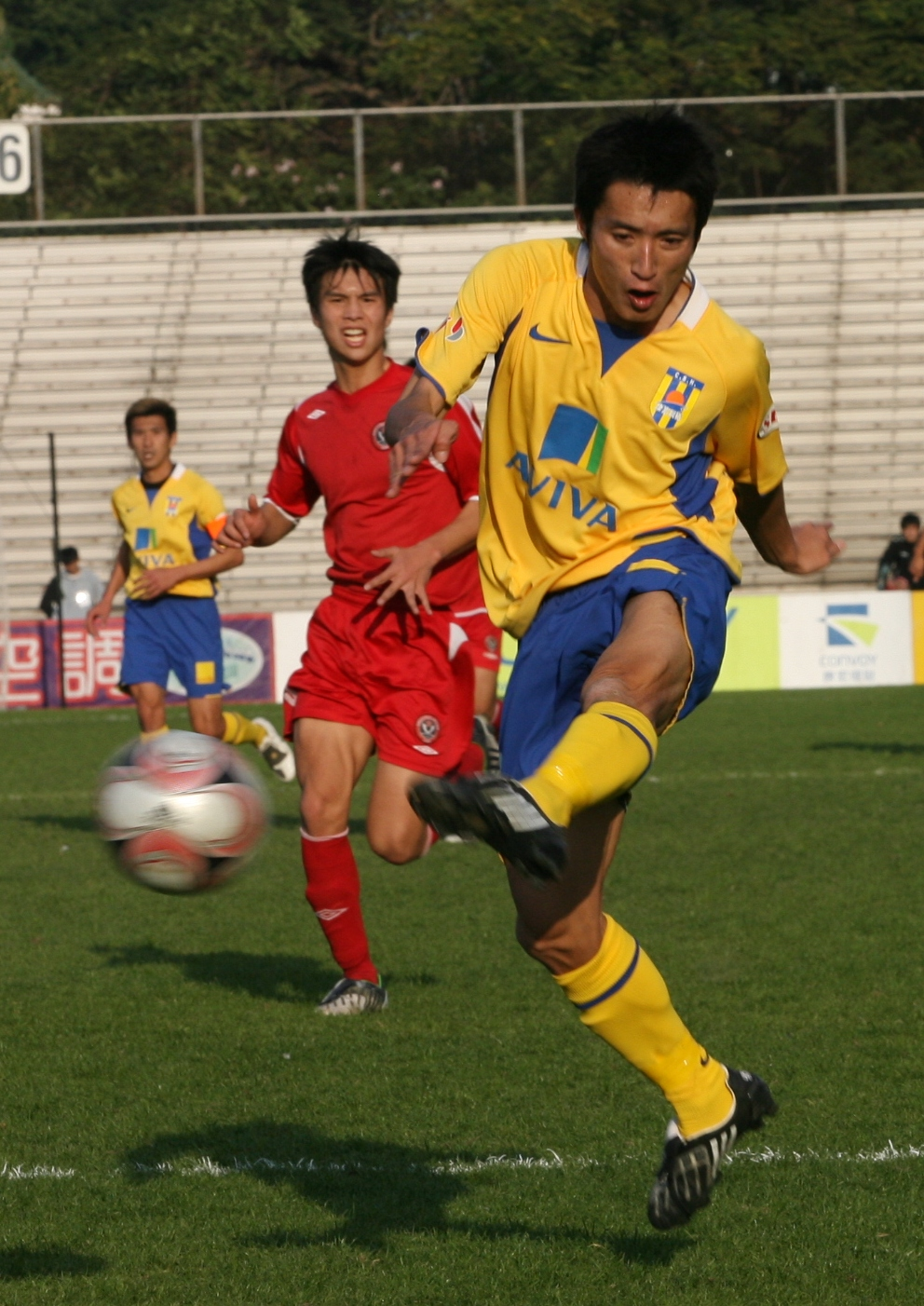

Personal information
- Full name: Chu Siu Kei
- Date of birth: 11 January 1980 (age 46)
- Place of birth: Hong Kong
- Height: 1.74 m (5 ft 9 in)
- Position: Midfielder

Senior career*
Years	Team	Apps	(Gls)
1997–1999	Rangers (HKG)		
1999–2001	Yee Hope		
2001–2002	Double Flower		
2002–2009	Sun Hei	88	(10)
2009–2010	Shatin	16	(4)
2010–2014	Kitchee	50	(9)
2014	Sun Source	12	(1)
2015–2016	Dreams Metro Gallery	9	(1)
2016–2017	South China	18	(1)
2018–2020	St. Joseph's	39	(1)
2022–2023	Leaper	4	(0)

International career^{‡}
1999–2001	Hong Kong U-23		
1998–2013	Hong Kong	45	(4)

Managerial career
- 2015–2016: Dreams Metro Gallery
- 2017–2018: Pegasus (assistant coach)
- 2021–2022: HK U23 (assistant coach)
- 2023–2024: Lee Man (assistant coach)
- 2024: Lee Man (caretaker)
- 2024–2025: Lee Man (assistant coach)
- 2025: Lee Man (caretaker)
- 2025–2026: Lee Man
- * Club domestic league appearances and goals as of 5 January 2020 ‡ National team caps and goals as of 8 August 2017

Chu Siu Kei (Chinese: 朱兆基; Cantonese Yale: Jyū Siuhgēi; born 11 January 1980) is a Hong Kong former professional footballer who played as a midfielder.

== Club career ==
Chu was a member of the Sun Hei squad that won five trophies (League, Silver Shield, League Cup, FA Cup and Hong Kong Football Sevens) during the 2004–05 season. He scored a total of three goals for Sun Hei in the 2008–09 Hong Kong First Division League season as the club finished 5th in the league table. He did however assist the club to win the 2008–09 Hong Kong League Cup.

He played as a midfielder for Shatin but in the early season he was plagued by injuries. On 24 October 2009, he started his first game for Shatin and promptly scored a hat-trick, one of them a bicycle kick, and helped his team beat Tai Po 4:1 to register Shatin's first win of the season. Chu was also named the match's Most Valuable Player. Chu in total scored 5 goals for Shatin but the club finished 9th and was relegated at the end of the season. At the end of the season, he was selected as a member of the Hong Kong League XI to play against Birmingham City in the Xtep Cup.

Chu moved to Kitchee after Shatin was relegated at the end of the 2009–10 season. In the penultimate match against Tai Chung, Chu scored a hat-trick and helped secured a 7–1 win for Kitchee. Chu finished the season having scored 5 goals for Kitchee and the club duly won its first league title in 47 years, allowing the club to play in both the 2011 Barclays Asia Trophy and 2012 AFC Cup. Chu was named the Best Eleven of the 2010–11 Hong Kong First Division League season.

After South China's decision to voluntarily relegate following the 2016–17 Hong Kong Premier League season, Chu's contract was terminated. Although he tried to find work with other clubs, his efforts were unsuccessful. Ultimately, Chu announced his retirement on 8 August 2017.

== International career ==
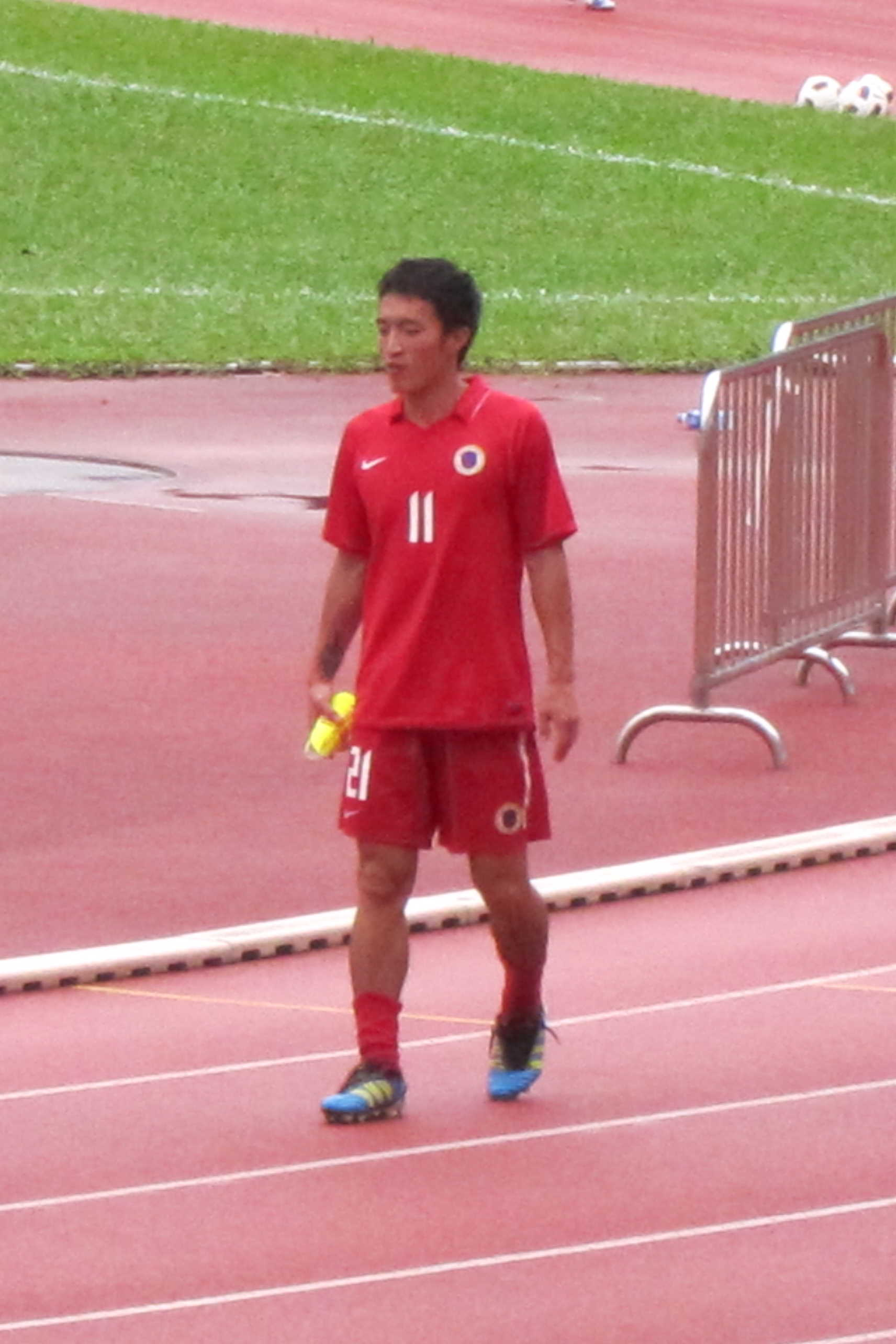
Chu playing for the Hong Kong national football team

Chu is a regular member of the Hong Kong national football team. On 4 October 2010, in a friendly match against India, in the 76th minute, Chu played a clever back heel to captain Li Haiqiang who volleyed the ball home for a 1–0 victory for Hong Kong.

Chu also took part in the 2014 FIFA World Cup Asian qualification matches for Hong Kong against Saudi Arabia. Because of that Chu was only able to play a symbolic 10 minutes against Chelsea in the 2011 Barclays Asia Trophy.

== Managerial career ==
On 29 May 2025, Chu was appointed as the head coach of Lee Man.

== Honours ==
Yee Hope

- Hong Kong Senior Shield: 2000–01

Sun Hei

- Hong Kong First Division: 2003–04, 2004–05
- Hong Kong Senior Shield: 2004–05
- Hong Kong League Cup: 2004–05, 2008–09
- Hong Kong FA Cup: 2002–03, 2004–05, 2005–06

Kitchee

- Hong Kong First Division: 2010–11, 2011–12, 2013–14
- Hong Kong League Cup: 2011–12
- Hong Kong FA Cup: 2011–12, 2012–13

Sun Source

- Hong Kong First Division: 2014–15

Hong Kong

- Hong Kong-Macau Interport: 2007
- Guangdong-Hong Kong Cup: 2013

== Career statistics ==
=== International ===
As of 4 June 2013

#	Date	Venue	Opponent	Result	Record	Competition
1	30 November 1998	Suphachalasai Stadium, Bangkok, Thailand	Oman	0–6	0	1998 Asian Games
2	18 February 2004	Darulmakmur Stadium, Penang, Malaysia	Malaysia	3–1	1	2006 FIFA World Cup qualification
3	31 March 2004	Siu Sai Wan Sports Ground, Hong Kong	China	0–1	0	2006 FIFA World Cup qualification
4	9 June 2004	Kazma SC Stadium, Kuwait City, Kuwait	Kuwait	0–4	0	2006 FIFA World Cup qualification
5	8 September 2004	Hong Kong Stadium, Hong Kong	Kuwait	0–2	0	2006 FIFA World Cup qualification
6	13 October 2004	Mong Kok Stadium, Hong Kong	Malaysia	2–0	0	2006 FIFA World Cup qualification
7	17 November 2004	Tianhe Stadium, Guangzhou, China	China	0–7	0	2006 FIFA World Cup qualification
8	30 November 2004	Jalan Besar Stadium, Singapore	Singapore	0–0 (6–5 PSO)	0	Friendly
9	9 February 2005	Hong Kong Stadium, Hong Kong	Brazil	1–7	0	2005 Carlsberg Cup
10	5 March 2005	Chungshan Soccer Stadium, Taipei, Chinese Taipei	Mongolia	6–0	1	2005 EAFF Championship Preliminary
11	7 March 2005	Chungshan Soccer Stadium, Taipei, Chinese Taipei	Guam	15–0	1	2005 EAFF Championship Preliminary
12	11 March 2005	Chungshan Soccer Stadium, Taipei, Chinese Taipei	Chinese Taipei	5–0	0	2005 EAFF Championship Preliminary
13	29 January 2006	Hong Kong Stadium, Hong Kong	Denmark	0–3	0	2006 Carlsberg Cup
14	1 February 2006	Hong Kong Stadium, Hong Kong	Croatia	0–4	0	2006 Carlsberg Cup
15	15 February 2006	Hong Kong Stadium, Hong Kong	Singapore	1–1	0	Friendly
16	18 February 2006	Hong Kong Stadium, Hong Kong	India	2–2	0	Friendly
17	22 February 2006	Hong Kong Stadium, Hong Kong	Qatar	0–3	0	2007 AFC Asian Cup qualification
18	12 August 2006	Hong Kong Stadium, Hong Kong	Singapore	1–2	0	Friendly
19	16 August 2006	Pakhtakor Markaziy Stadium, Tashkent, Uzbekistan	Uzbekistan	2–2	0	2007 AFC Asian Cup qualification
20	6 September 2006	Hong Kong Stadium, Hong Kong	Uzbekistan	0–0	0	2007 AFC Asian Cup qualification
21	6 September 2006	Al Gharrafa Stadium, Doha, Qatar	Qatar	0–2	0	2007 AFC Asian Cup qualification
22	15 November 2006	Mong Kok Stadium, Hong Kong	Bangladesh	2–0	0	2007 AFC Asian Cup qualification
23	1 June 2007	Gelora Bung Karno Stadium, Jakarta, Indonesia	Indonesia	0–3	0	Friendly
24	10 June 2007	So Kon Po Recreation Ground, Hong Kong	Macau	2–1	1	2007 Hong Kong–Macau Interport
25	19 June 2007	Estádio Campo Desportivo, Macau	Chinese Taipei	1–1	0	2008 EAFF Championship Preliminary
26	21 June 2007	Estádio Campo Desportivo, Macau	Guam	15–1	0	2008 EAFF Championship Preliminary
27	24 June 2007	Estádio Campo Desportivo, Macau	North Korea	0–1	0	2008 EAFF Championship Preliminary
28	21 October 2007	Gianyar Stadium, Gianyar, Indonesia	Timor-Leste	3–2	0	2010 FIFA World Cup qualification
29	28 October 2007	Hong Kong Stadium, Hong Kong	Timor-Leste	8–1	0	2010 FIFA World Cup qualification
30	10 November 2007	Hong Kong Stadium, Hong Kong	Turkmenistan	0–0	0	2010 FIFA World Cup qualification
31	18 November 2007	Olympic Stadium, Ashgabat, Turkmenistan	Turkmenistan	0–3	0	2010 FIFA World Cup qualification
32	4 October 2010	Balewadi Stadium, Pune, India	India	1–0	0	Friendly
33	17 November 2010	Hong Kong Stadium, Hong Kong	Paraguay	0–7	0	Friendly
34	9 February 2011	Shah Alam Stadium, Kuala Lumpur	Malaysia	0–2	0	Friendly
35	3 June 2011	Siu Sai Wan Sports Ground, Hong Kong	Malaysia	1–1	0	Friendly
36	23 July 2011	Prince Mohamed bin Fahd Stadium, Dammam	Saudi Arabia	0–3	0	2014 FIFA World Cup qualification
37	28 July 2011	Siu Sai Wan Sports Ground, Hong Kong	Saudi Arabia	0–5	0	2014 FIFA World Cup qualification
38	16 October 2012	Mong Kok Stadium, Mong Kok, Kowloon	Malaysia	0–3	0	Friendly
39	1 December 2012	Mong Kok Stadium, Mong Kok, Hong Kong	Guam	2–1	0	2013 EAFF East Asian Cup Preliminary Competition Round 2
40	3 December 2012	Mong Kok Stadium, Mong Kok, Hong Kong	Australia	0–1	0	2013 EAFF East Asian Cup Preliminary Competition Round 2
41	7 December 2012	Hong Kong Stadium, So Kon Po, Hong Kong	Chinese Taipei	2–0	0	2013 EAFF East Asian Cup Preliminary Competition Round 2
42	9 December 2012	Hong Kong Stadium, So Kon Po, Hong Kong	North Korea	0–4	0	2013 EAFF East Asian Cup Preliminary Competition Round 2
43	6 February 2013	Pakhtakor Stadium, Uzbekistan	Uzbekistan	0–0	0	2015 AFC Asian Cup qualification
44	22 March 2013	Mong Kok Stadium, Mong Kok, Hong Kong	Vietnam	1–0	0	2015 AFC Asian Cup qualification
45	4 June 2013	Mong Kok Stadium, Mong Kok, Hong Kong	Philippines	0–1	0	Friendly

Sporting positions
Preceded by Roberto Losada	Kitchee SC captain June 2012–2014	Succeeded by ?
