= 2007 Hong Kong–Macau Interport =

The 63rd Hong Kong Macau Interport was held in Hong Kong on 10 June 2007. Hong Kong captured the champion by winning 2-1. This was a FIFA-recognised full international match.

== Squads ==
=== Hong Kong ===
The following shows part of the squad only. The number of caps is as of before the match.

No.	Pos.	Player	Date of birth (age)	Caps	Club
	GK	Fan Chun Yip	1 May 1976 (age 31)	32	(Hong Kong) Happy Valley
	DF	Lee Wai Lun	7 March 1981 (age 26)	9	(Hong Kong) Xiangxue Sun Hei
	DF	Poon Yiu Cheuk	19 September 1977 (age 29)	47	(Hong Kong) Happy Valley
	DF	Chan Wai Ho	24 April 1982 (age 25)		(Hong Kong) Rangers
	DF	Cristiano Cordeiro	14 August 1973 (age 33)	3	(Hong Kong) Xiangxue Sun Hei
	MF	Leung Chun Pong	1 October 1986 (age 22)	6	(Hong Kong) Citizen
	MF	Poon Man Tik	24 February 1975 (age 32)		(Hong Kong) Happy Valley
	MF	Gerard	21 September 1978 (age 28)	12	(Hong Kong) Happy Valley
	MF	Lo Chi Kwan	18 March 1981 (age 26)	17	(Hong Kong) Xiangxue Sun Hei
	FW	Chan Siu Ki	14 July 1985 (age 21)		(Hong Kong) Kitchee
	FW	Chu Siu Kei	11 January 1980 (age 27)	23	(Hong Kong) Xiangxue Sun Hei

=== Macau ===
- Chief Director: Vitor Cheung
- Directors: Chong Coc Veng, Sin Chi Yiu, Chang Chin Nam
- Head Coach: (Japan) Masanaga Kageyama
- Coaches: 容楚英, Chu Hon Ming William
- Administrator: 梁恩庭

No.	Pos.	Player	Date of birth (age)	Caps	Club
	GK	Domingos Chan	11 September 1970 (age 36)		(Hong Kong) Xiangxue Sun Hei
	GK	Leong Chon Kit			
	DF	Sou Fai Wong			
	DF	Lam Ka Koi			
	DF	Chan Pak Chun			
	MF	Kong Cheng Hou			
	MF	Cheang Cheng Ieong Paulo	18 August 1984 (age 22)		
	MF	Che Chi Man			
	MF	Geofredo Cheung	18 May 1979 (age 28)		
	MF	Ian Chi Pang			
	MF	Leong Lap San			
	FW	Chong Kun Kan			
	FW	李志城			
	FW	Chan Kin Seng	19 March 1985 (age 22)		(Macau) Monte Carlo
	FW	Leong Chong In			
	FW	Iek Kim Pang			
		李富榮			
		路易士			
		劉柏堅			
		阮德恩			

== Results ==
10 June 2007
15:00 UTC+8

Hong Kong	2 - 1	Macau
Chu Siu Kei ?'; Chan Siu Ki 63'	(Report) (in Chinese)	Chan Kin Seng ?'

So Kon Po Recreation Ground, Hong Kong
