= Michael Campion (footballer) =

Hong Kong footballer (born 1984)

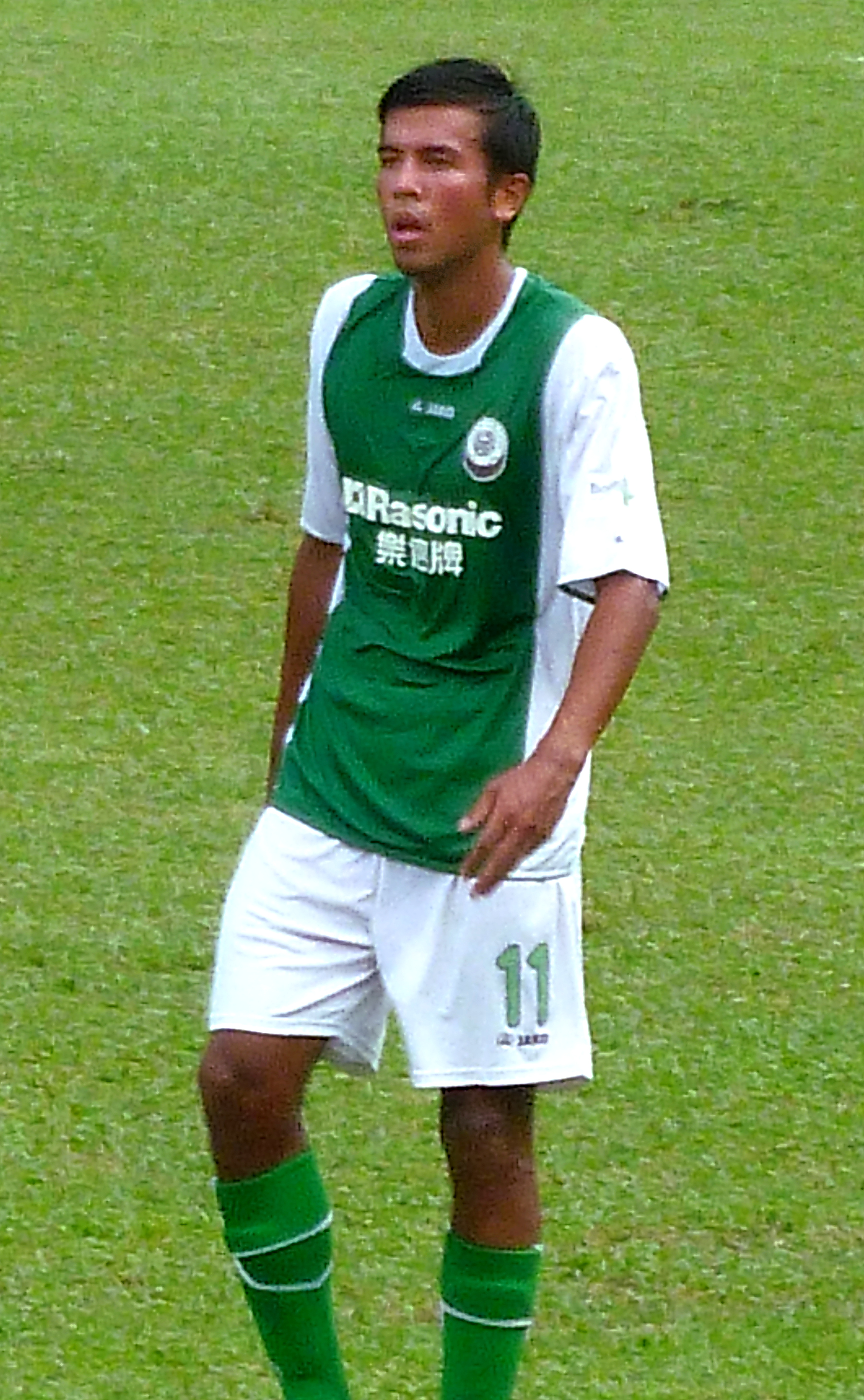

Personal information
- Full name: Michael Xavier Campion
- Date of birth: 20 May 1984 (age 42)
- Place of birth: Hong Kong Island, Hong Kong
- Position: Midfielder

Youth career
- Sing Tao
- Hong Kong FC
- Edinburgh University
- 2007: Preston Athletic

Senior career*
Years	Team	Apps	(Gls)
2010–2011	HKFC	11	(2)
2011–2013	Citizen	23	(4)
2013–2015	Pegasus	8	(1)
2015	→ South China (loan)	2	(0)
2015–2016	HKFC	19	(1)
- * Club domestic league appearances and goals as of 15 May 2016 ‡ National team caps and goals as of 21 December 2012

Michael Campion
- Traditional Chinese: 金寶
- Simplified Chinese: 金宝
Transcriptions
Yue: Cantonese
- Jyutping: Gam1 Bou2

Michael Xavier Campion (born 20 May 1984) is a Hong Kong former professional footballer who played as a midfielder. He is of English and Filipino descent.

== Club career ==
=== HKFC ===
Campion played part-time football for HKFC while working as a wine importer. He scored his first league goal in HKFC's 2–4 defeat by Rangers. He scored his second goal against Kitchee in the final match of the season.

=== Citizen ===
He gave up his full-time job to concentrate on his football career upon joining Citizen. Campion claimed that he had a stable job working for a wine importer with good income. But he had to entertain clients and he would rather enjoy football and pursue his football dream while he is still young. Michael is very excited about representing Citizen in the 2012 AFC Cup.

=== Pegasus ===
On 6 June 2013, it was reported by the Apple Daily that he had signed for the ambitious Pegasus for the upcoming season.

=== South China ===
On 13 January 2015, news emerged that Michael Campion had agreed on a deal to join South China on loan for the second half of the season and would wear the number 3 jersey.

== Honours ==
=== International ===
Hong Kong

- Guangdong-Hong Kong Cup: 2013
