= Behram Abduweli =

Chinese footballer (born 2003)

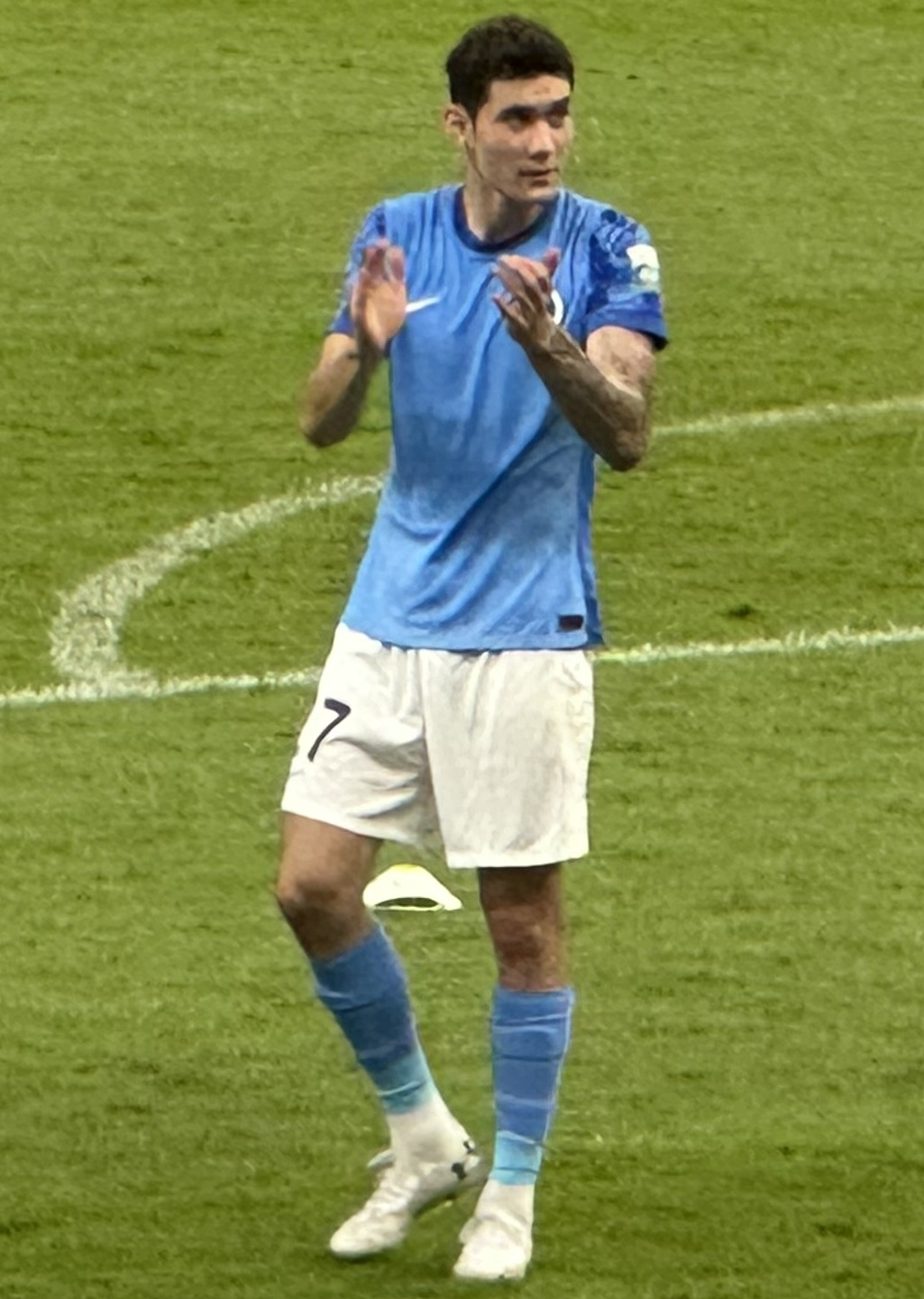
- Behram in April 2025

Personal information
- Date of birth: 8 March 2003 (age 23)
- Place of birth: Yining, Xinjiang, China
- Height: 1.88 m (6 ft 2 in)
- Position: Forward

Team information
- Current team: Chengdu Rongcheng
- Number: 27

Youth career
- 2015–2021: Inner Mongolia Shengle Mengyang
- 2021–2022: Shandong Taishan

Senior career*
Years	Team	Apps	(Gls)
2022–2023	Shandong Taishan	0	(0)
2022	→ Jinan Xingzhou (loan)	8	(1)
2023	→ Sichuan Jiuniu (loan)	16	(5)
2024–2025	Shenzhen Peng City	39	(2)
2026–	Chengdu Rongcheng	22	(4)

International career^{‡}
2022–2023	China U20	7	(0)
2023–2026	China U23	25	(5)
2024–	China	14	(2 (Note: Some football databases list the goal scored by China in the match played against Thailand on 6 June 2024 as being scored by Behram. A close-range volley from Behram scraped Zhang Yuning in the back, and as a result, the goal was given to Zhang according to most sources. In the follow-up, Behram scored a goal for China against Indonesia, for which the Asian Football Confederation described as Behram's "first international goal." This article recognises the goal scored against Thailand as being scored by Zhang.))
Medal record
Representing China
AFC U-23 Asian Cup
Runner-up	2026 Saudi Arabia	Team
Asian Games
Bronze medal – third place	2026 Aichi–Nagoya	Team
- * Club domestic league appearances and goals as of 28 August 2025 ‡ National team caps and goals as of 17 November 2026

Behram Abduweli (Chinese: 拜合拉木·阿卜杜外力; pinyin: Bàihélāmù Ābǔdùwàilì; Uyghur: بەھرام ئابدۇۋەلى; born 8 March 2003) is a Chinese professional footballer who plays as a forward for Chinese Super League club Chengdu Rongcheng and the China national team.

== Early and personal life ==
Behram was born on 8 March 2003 in Yining, Xinjiang Uyghur Autonomous Region, China. He experienced significant family hardship during his childhood: his father died when he was four years old, followed by his mother when he was eleven. He and his older brother, Kamran, were subsequently orphaned and relied on their grandfather's retirement pension for financial support. As children, the brothers helped support their household by selling corn and ice pops on the streets and collecting second-hand mobile phones for resale.

Both brothers developed a passion for football at an early age. After Behram started primary school, his talent was recognised by his physical education teachers, Kurban Tay and Shoklet. However, financial difficulties and limited access to training facilities prevented him from receiving systematic football training for an extended period.

His older brother, Kamran, also showed considerable footballing talent and received several invitations to attend trials with professional clubs. However, due to the family's financial circumstances and his responsibility to care for their grandfather, Kamran declined trial opportunities on two occasions, allowing his younger brother to pursue a football career instead.

After Behram left his hometown to pursue a football career, Kamran remained in Yining and became a driving instructor, continuing to support his younger brother's ambitions.

== Club career ==
=== Shandong Taishan ===
Born in Yining, Xinjiang, Behram started his career with the Inner Mongolia Shengle Mengyang team in 2015. In October 2021, he moved to Chinese Super League side Shandong Taishan. He would be given an opportunity to participate within senior games when he was part of the AFC Champions League squad, which was a mix of reserves and youth players to participate within centralized venues while the clubs senior players were still dealing with self-isolating measures due to COVID-19. This would see him make his debut in an AFC Champions League continental game on 15 April 2022 against Daegu FC in a 7–0 defeat.

==== Jinan Xingzhou loan ====
Midway through the 2022 season, he was sent on loan to China League Two side Jinan Xingzhou.

==== Sichuan Jiuniu loan ====
On 21 April 2023, Behram was loaned to China League One outfit Sichuan Jiuniu for a one-season loan. In what would be Sichuan Jiuniu's China League One title-winning season, Behram scored five goals.

=== Shenzhen Peng City ===
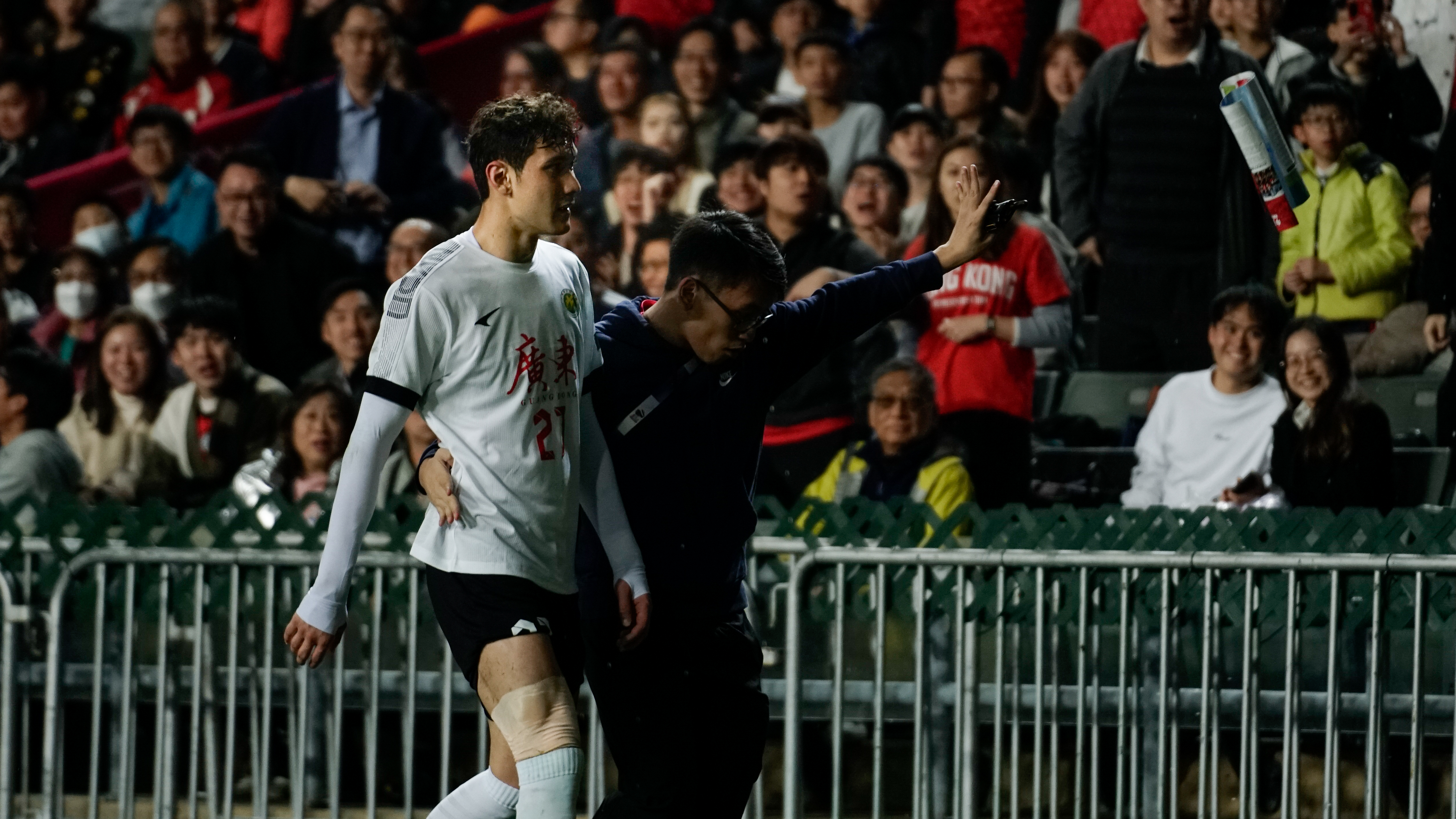
Behram playing in the 43rd Guangdong–Hong Kong Cup

After Sichuan Jiuniu's relocation to Shenzhen to become Shenzhen Peng City, Behram joined the club on a permanent basis in their debut Chinese Super League season. On 25 June 2024, Behram scored his first Chinese Super League goal in a home game against Zhejiang in a 3–2 win, producing the winner in the seventh minute of second-half stoppage time.

=== Chengdu Rongcheng ===
On 13 February 2026, Behram transferred to Chinese Super League club Chengdu Rongcheng for a reported €805k transfer fee.

== International career ==
Behram has represented China from under-18 to under-20 level.

He scored three goals in his first two appearances for the under-20 side, before being called up to the squad for the 2023 AFC U-20 Asian Cup.

Behram made his debut for the China national team on 6 June 2024 in a 2026 FIFA World Cup qualifier against Thailand when he replaced Gao Tianyi in the 29th minute. He scored his first goal for China against another Southeast Asian opponent, Indonesia, in a 2–1 FIFA World Cup qualifier win in Qingdao.

== Personal life ==
Behram is a Chinese Muslim of Uyghur ethnicity.

== Career statistics ==
=== Club ===
As of match played 7 September 2024

Appearances and goals by club, season and competition
Club	Season	League			Chinese FA Cup		Continental		Other		Total	
Club	Season	Division	Apps	Goals	Apps	Goals	Apps	Goals	Apps	Goals	Apps	Goals
Shandong Taishan	2022	CSL	0	0	0	0	6 (Note: Appearances in the AFC Champions League)	0	0	0	6	0
Jinan Xingzhou (loan)	2022	China League Two	8	1	4	1	—		—		12	2
Sichuan Jiuniu (loan)	2023	China League One	16	5	0	0	—		0	0	16	5
Shenzhen Peng City	2024	CSL	17	1	2	0	—		—		19	1
Career total			41	7	6	1	6	0	0	0	53	8

=== International ===
As of 17 November 2026

Appearances and goals by national team and year
National team	Year	Apps	Goals
China	2024	7	1
China	2025	2	0
China	2026	5	1
Total		14	2

As of match played 17 November 2026
China score listed first, score column indicates score after each Behram goal

List of international goals scored by Behram Abduweli
No.	Date	Venue	Opponent	Score	Result	Competition
1	15 October 2024	Qingdao Youth Football Stadium, Qingdao, China	Indonesia	1–0	2–1	2026 FIFA World Cup qualification
2	17 November 2026	Zhaoqing New District Sports Center Stadium, Zhaoqing, China	Bahrain	1–2	2–2	Friendly

== Honours ==
Sichuan Jiuniu

- China League One: 2023

China U23

- AFC U-23 Asian Cup runner-up: 2026

Individual

- Chinese Golden Boy (U21): 2023
