= Chan Kin Seng =

Macau footballer

Chan Kin Seng 陳健星
Personal information
- Full name: Chan Kin Seng
- Date of birth: 19 March 1985 (age 41)
- Place of birth: Macau
- Height: 1.81 m (5 ft 11 1/2 in)
- Position: Striker

Team information
- Current team: Monte Carlo
- Number: 9

Senior career*
| Years | Team | Apps | (Gls) |
| 2005–2008 | Monte Carlo | | |
| 2008–2011 | Windsor Arch Ka I | | |
| 2012– | Monte Carlo | | |

International career^{‡}
| 2006–2013 | Macau | 27 | (17) |
- * Club domestic league appearances and goals as of 10:24, 25 September 2012 (UTC) ‡ National team caps and goals as of 19:27, 5 August 2012 (UTC)

Chan Kin Seng
- Traditional Chinese: 陳健星
- Simplified Chinese: 陈健星
Transcriptions
Standard Mandarin
- Hanyu Pinyin: Chén Jiànxīng
Yue: Cantonese
- Yale Romanization: Chan4 Gin6 Sing1
- Jyutping: Can4 Gin6 Sing1

Chan Kin Seng (Chinese: 陳健星; pinyin: Chén Jiànxīng; Cantonese Yale: Chan4 Gin6 Sing1; born 19 March 1985) is a Macanese footballer who currently plays for Monte Carlo of the Macau 1st Division Football. He also has played for the Macau national team in the 2006 AFC Challenge Cup, 2006 Lusophony Games and scored both goals for Macau in their 2–13 aggregate 2010 FIFA World Cup qualification match loss to Thailand.

== International goals ==
Scores and results list Macau's goal tally first.

List of international goals scored by Chan Kin Seng
| No. | Date | Venue | Opponent | Score | Result | Competition |
|---|---|---|---|---|---|---|
| 1. | 6 April 2006 | Bangabandhu National Stadium, Dhaka | Pakistan | 1–1 | 2–2 | 2006 AFC Challenge Cup |
| 2. | 6 April 2006 | Bangabandhu National Stadium, Dhaka | Pakistan | 2–2 | 2–2 | 2006 AFC Challenge Cup |
| 3. | 10 June 2007 | So Kon Po Recreation Ground, Hong Kong | Hong Kong | 1–1 | 1–2 | 2007 Hong Kong–Macau Interport |
| 4. | 21 June 2007 | Macau Stadium, Tapai | North Korea | 1–5 | 1–7 | 2008 East Asian Football Championship |
| 5. | 8 October 2007 | Suphachalasai Stadium, Bangkok | Thailand | 1–2 | 1–6 | 2010 FIFA World Cup qualification |
| 6. | 15 October 2007 | Macau Stadium, Taipa | Thailand | 1–7 | 1–7 | 2010 FIFA World Cup qualification |
| 7. | 24 May 2008 | Olympic Stadium, Phnom Penh | Nepal | 2–2 | 2–3 | 2008 AFC Challenge Cup qualification |
| 8. | 11 March 2009 | Leo Palace Resort Soccer Field, Yona | Northern Mariana Islands | 1–1 | 6–1 | 2010 East Asian Football Championship |
| 9. | 11 March 2009 | Leo Palace Resort Soccer Field, Yona | Northern Mariana Islands | 2–1 | 6–1 | 2010 East Asian Football Championship |
| 10. | 15 March 2009 | Leo Palace Resort Soccer Field, Yona | Guam | 1–0 | 2–2 | 2010 East Asian Football Championship |
| 11. | 15 March 2009 | Leo Palace Resort Soccer Field, Yona | Guam | 2–1 | 2–2 | 2010 East Asian Football Championship |
| 12. | 7 April 2009 | Macau Stadium, Taipa | Mongolia | 1–0 | 2–0 | 2010 AFC Challenge Cup qualification |
| 13. | 14 April 2009 | MFF Football Centre, Ulaanbaatar | Mongolia | 1–0 | 1–3 | 2010 AFC Challenge Cup qualification |
| 14. | 20 July 2012 | Leo Palace Resort Soccer Field, Yona | Northern Mariana Islands | 1–0 | 5–1 | 2013 EAFF East Asian Cup |
| 15. | 20 July 2012 | Leo Palace Resort Soccer Field, Yona | Northern Mariana Islands | 4–1 | 5–1 | 2013 EAFF East Asian Cup |
| 16. | 20 July 2012 | Leo Palace Resort Soccer Field, Yona | Northern Mariana Islands | 5–1 | 5–1 | 2013 EAFF East Asian Cup |
| 17. | 25 September 2012 | Rizal Memorial Stadium, Manila | Chinese Taipei | 2–1 | 2–2 | 2012 Philippine Peace Cup |

Correct as of 21 January 2017

| Preceded by Jong Tae-Se | East Asian Football Championship Preliminary; Top Scorer; 2010 | Succeeded by Incumbent |
