= Rao Weihui =

Chinese footballer

Rao Weihui 饶伟辉
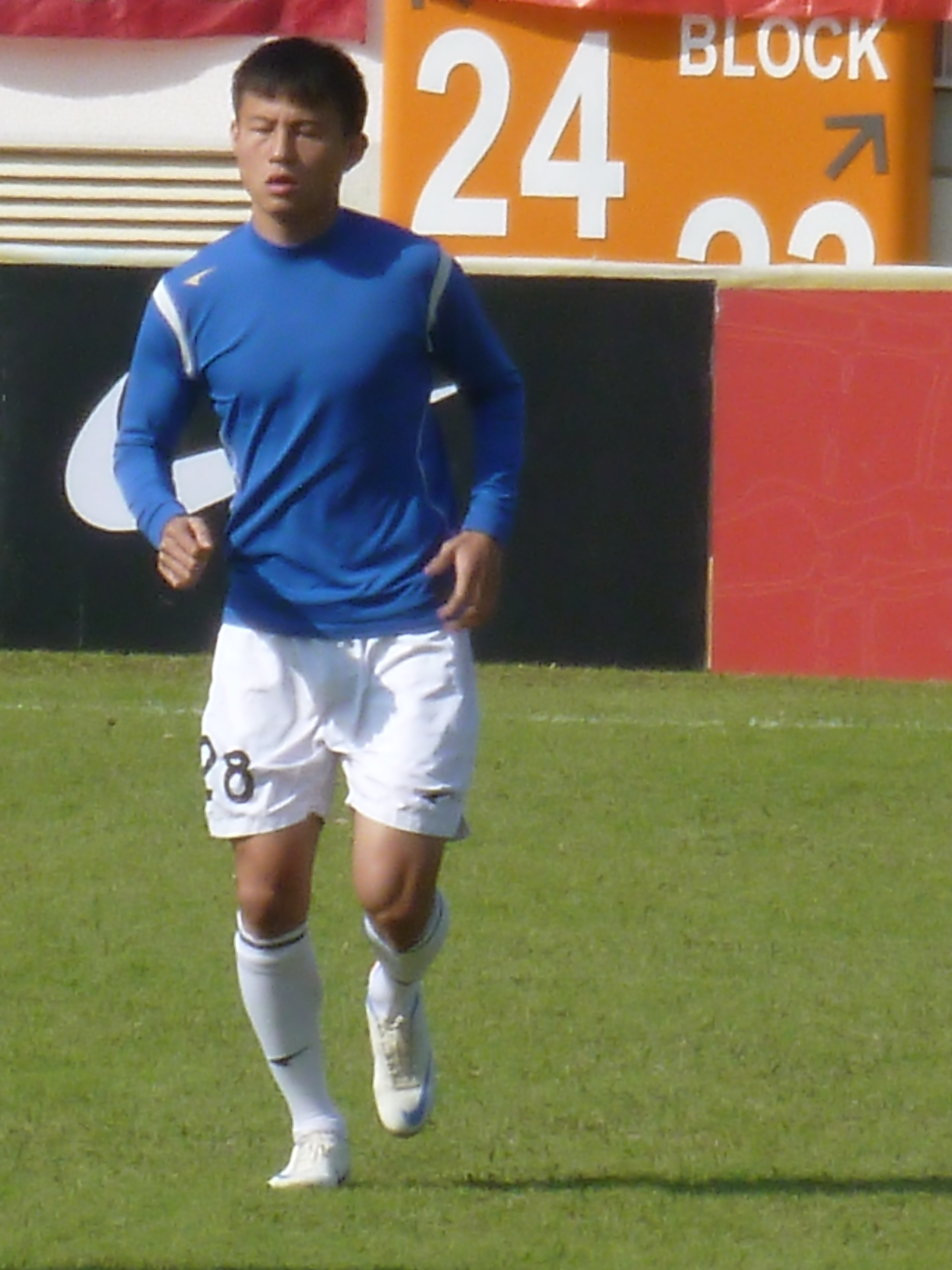

Personal information
- Full name: Rao Weihui
- Date of birth: 25 March 1989 (age 37)
- Place of birth: Xingning, Guangdong, China
- Height: 1.78 m (5 ft 10 in)
- Position: Left-back

Youth career
- 2003–2007: Shaanxi Chanba

Senior career*
Years	Team	Apps	(Gls)
2008–2019	Beijing Renhe	214	(1)
2020–2022	Changchun Yatai	55	(0)
2023–2025	Meizhou Hakka	66	(0)

International career^{‡}
2010–2012	China U-23		
2014–2015	China	3	(0)
Medal record
Representing China
Men's football
EAFF Championship
Silver medal – second place	2015 China	Team
- * Club domestic league appearances and goals as of 28 August 2025 ‡ National team caps and goals as of 18 November 2014

Rao Weihui (simplified Chinese: 饶伟辉; traditional Chinese: 饒偉輝; pinyin: Ráo Wěihuī; born 25 March 1989) is a Chinese footballer.

== Club career ==
Rao Weihui started his football career in 2008 with Chinese Super League club Shaanxi Chanba after he graduated from the club's youth team. He made his debut for the club on 9 April 2008 in a 0–0 away draw with Shenzhen Shangqingyin and was described by then manager Cheng Yaodong as an exciting prospect for the future. Despite the strong support from the manager, the club would struggle during the 2009 season with ultimately led to Cheng leaving the club, which left Rao with very little playing time throughout the season. However, in the following season, new manager Zhu Guanghu decided to move Rao from a midfield position into the defense where he quickly established himself as the team's starting fullback. Before the 2012 season, Rao stayed with Shaanxi as the club decided to move to Guizhou and rename themselves Guizhou Renhe.

In the 2019 Chinese Super League season Rao would suffer from a fibula fracture injury and it saw him miss much of the season while he saw his team get relegated at the end of the campaign. Having spent his whole career with the same club he was allowed to transfer to second-tier club Changchun Yatai who he officially joined on 31 August 2020. On 12 September 2020 he would make his debut in the first league game for the club of the season that ended in a 2–1 victory against Heilongjiang Lava Spring. Rao would go on to establish himself as a vital member of the team and at the end of the 2020 league campaign he would go on to win the division title with the club.

== International career ==
Rao made his debut for the Chinese national team on 18 November 2014 in a 0–0 draw against Honduras.

== Career statistics ==
As of match played 31 December 2024

Appearances and goals by club, season and competition
Club	Season	League			National Cup		Continental		Other		Total	
Club	Season	Division	Apps	Goals	Apps	Goals	Apps	Goals	Apps	Goals	Apps	Goals
Shaanxi Chanba / Guizhou Renhe / Beijing Renhe	2008	Chinese Super League	3	0	-		-		-		3	0
Shaanxi Chanba / Guizhou Renhe / Beijing Renhe	2009	Chinese Super League	1	0	-		-		-		1	0
Shaanxi Chanba / Guizhou Renhe / Beijing Renhe	2010	Chinese Super League	25	0	-		-		-		25	0
Shaanxi Chanba / Guizhou Renhe / Beijing Renhe	2011	Chinese Super League	26	0	2	0	-		-		28	0
Shaanxi Chanba / Guizhou Renhe / Beijing Renhe	2012	Chinese Super League	11	0	3	1	-		-		14	1
Shaanxi Chanba / Guizhou Renhe / Beijing Renhe	2013	Chinese Super League	12	0	3	0	6	0	-		21	0
Shaanxi Chanba / Guizhou Renhe / Beijing Renhe	2014	Chinese Super League	28	1	2	0	5	0	1 (Note: Appearances in Chinese FA Super Cup)	0	35	1
Shaanxi Chanba / Guizhou Renhe / Beijing Renhe	2015	Chinese Super League	25	0	0	0	-		-		25	0
Shaanxi Chanba / Guizhou Renhe / Beijing Renhe	2016	China League One	20	0	0	0	-		-		20	0
Shaanxi Chanba / Guizhou Renhe / Beijing Renhe	2017	China League One	21	0	0	0	-		-		21	0
Shaanxi Chanba / Guizhou Renhe / Beijing Renhe	2018	Chinese Super League	29	0	0	0	-		-		29	0
Shaanxi Chanba / Guizhou Renhe / Beijing Renhe	2019	Chinese Super League	13	0	0	0	-		-		13	0
Shaanxi Chanba / Guizhou Renhe / Beijing Renhe	Total		214	1	10	1	11	0	1	0	236	2
Changchun Yatai	2020	China League One	14	0	0	0	-		-		14	0
Changchun Yatai	2021	Chinese Super League	13	0	2	0	-		-		15	0
Changchun Yatai	2022	Chinese Super League	28	0	0	0	-		-		28	0
Changchun Yatai	Total		55	0	2	0	0	0	0	0	57	0
Meizhou Hakka	2023	Chinese Super League	26	0	1	0	-		-		27	0
Meizhou Hakka	2024	Chinese Super League	19	0	0	0	-		-		19	0
Meizhou Hakka	Total		45	0	1	0	0	0	0	0	46	0
Career total			314	1	13	1	11	0	1	0	339	2

== Honours ==
=== Club ===
Guizhou Renhe

- Chinese FA Cup: 2013
- Chinese FA Super Cup: 2014

Changchun Yatai

- China League One: 2020
