= Lau Ka Kiu =

Hong Kong footballer

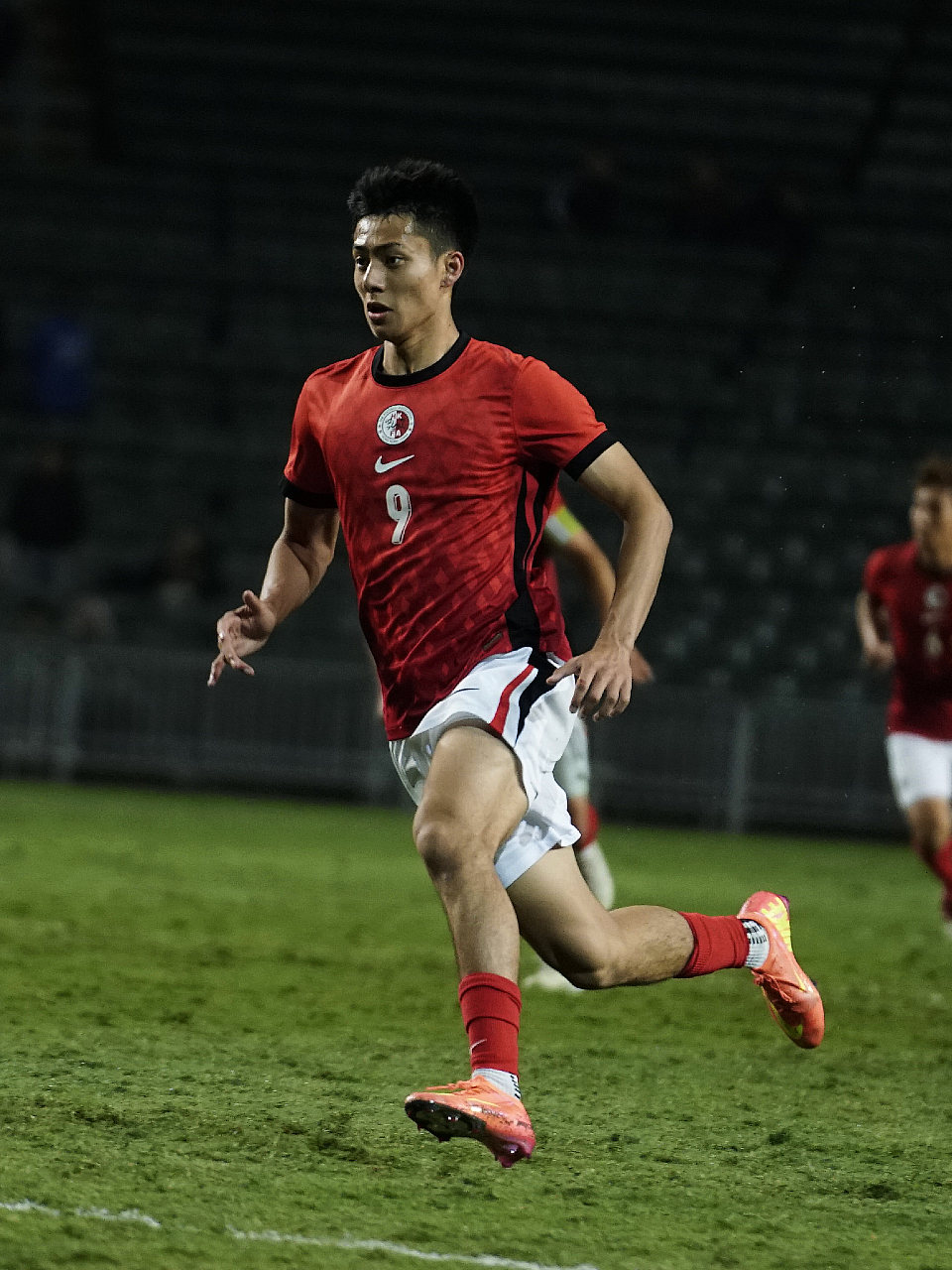

Personal information
- Full name: Kyle Lau Ka Kiu
- Date of birth: 10 February 2002 (age 24)
- Place of birth: Hong Kong
- Height: 1.84 m (6 ft 0 in)
- Position: Forward

Youth career
- 2014–2018: CFCSSHK
- 2019–2020: HKFC

College career
Years	Team	Apps	(Gls)
2021–2025	Pomona-Pitzer	29	(8)

Senior career*
Years	Team	Apps	(Gls)
2018–2019	CFCSSHK	2	(3)
2020–2021	HKFC	12	(6)
2022–2024	HK U23	9	(2)
2025–2026	Lee Man	20	(1)

International career^{‡}
2017–2018	Hong Kong U-16	6	(1)
2019	Hong Kong U-19	2	(2)
2023	Hong Kong U-22	7	(1)
2025	Hong Kong	7	(0)
- * Club domestic league appearances and goals as of 17 May 2026 ‡ National team caps and goals as of 13 November 2025

Kyle Lau Ka Kiu (Chinese: 劉家喬; born 10 February 2002) is a Hong Kong former professional footballer who played as a forward.

== Early life ==
As a youth player, Lau joined the youth academy of HKFC. He also played for the Chinese International School football team in Secondary school.

== College career ==
After graduating high school, Lau enrolled in the Department of Economics and Mathematics at Pomona-Pitzer college in the United States, where he also played for the university soccer team.

== Club career ==
On 28 December 2022, Lau joined HK U23.

On 3 January 2025, Lau joined Lee Man.

Following the conclusion of 2025–26 season, Lau stepped away from playing career to pursue studies at Tsinghua University.

== International career ==
Lau had represented Hong Kong at various youth teams. His most recent appearance was during the 2023 Merlion Cup where he scored a goal against Malaysia U-23.

On 27 March 2023, Lau was called up to the senior national team for the first time for a friendly match against Malaysia after his impressive performance during the 2023 Merlion Cup.

On 10 June 2025, Lau made his international debut for Hong Kong in the 2027 AFC Asian Cup qualification match against India.

== Style of play ==
Lau mainly operates as a forward.

== Career statistics ==
=== International ===
As of 13 November 2025

National team	Year	Apps	Goals
Hong Kong	2025	7	0
Total		7	0

== Honour ==
Lee Man

- Hong Kong League Cup: 2025–26
