= Liao Junjian =

Chinese footballer

Liao Junjian 廖均健
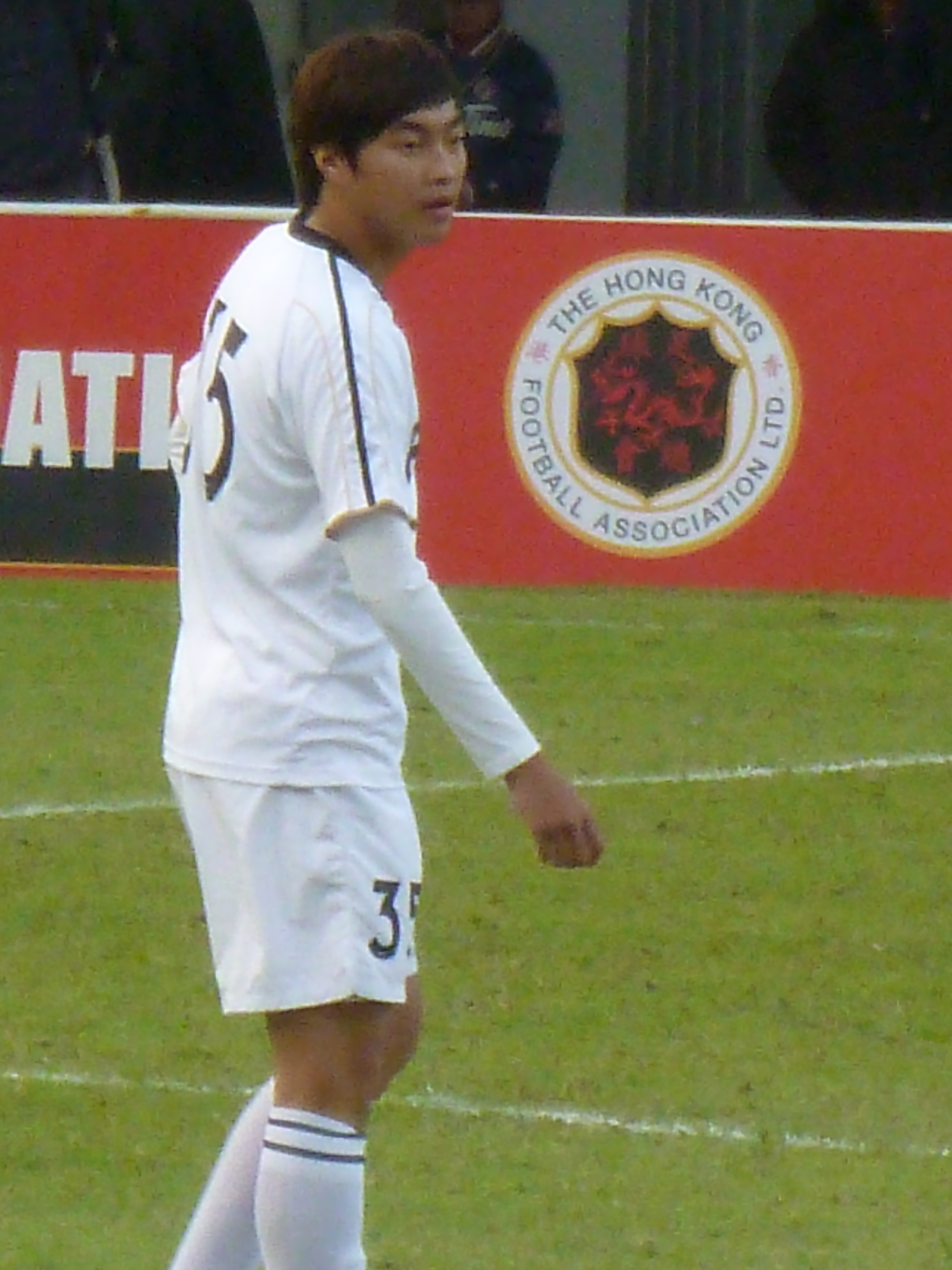

Personal information
- Date of birth: 27 January 1994 (age 32)
- Place of birth: Beihai, Guangxi, China
- Height: 1.83 m (6 ft 0 in)
- Position: Defender

Team information
- Current team: Guangdong GZ-Power
- Number: 16

Youth career
- 2005–2008: Guangxi Jinsangzi Football School
- 2008–2010: Dongguan Nancheng

Senior career*
Years	Team	Apps	(Gls)
2011–2012	Dongguan Nancheng	28	(2)
2012–2014	Guangdong Sunray Cave	56	(0)
2015–2018	Hebei China Fortune	49	(0)
2017	→ Chongqing Lifan (loan)	0	(0)
2018	→ Wuhan Zall (loan)	29	(1)
2019–2021	Wuhan FC	61	(1)
2022–2025	Meizhou Hakka	104	(3)
2026–	Guangdong GZ-Power	0	(0)

International career
2013–2015	China U-23		
- * Club domestic league appearances and goals as of 28 August 2025

Liao Junjian (Chinese: 廖均健; pinyin: Liào Jūnjiàn; born 27 January 1994) is a Chinese footballer who plays for Guangdong GZ-Power.

== Club career ==
Liao Junjian started his football career when he was promoted to Dongguan Nancheng's first team in the 2011 season. He transferred to China League One side Guangdong Sunray Cave in July 2012.

On 27 February 2015, Liao moved to League One club Hebei China Fortune after Guangdong Sunray Cave dissolved. On 15 April 2015, he made his debut for Hebei in a Chinese FA Cup match against his hometown club Guangxi Longguida. Liao made his league debut for Hebei on 2 May 2015 in a 2–0 home victory against Dalian Aerbin, coming on as a substitute for Xu Xiaolong in the 84th minute. He played 21 league matches for the club in the 2015 season, as Hebei China Fortune won promotion to the Chinese Super League after they finished the second place of the league. On 4 March 2016, Liao made his Super League debut in a 2–1 away win over Guangzhou R&F. He assisted Gervinho's winning goal in the match. He was the regular starter of the club, appearing 28 league matches of 30 in the 2016 season.

Liao injured during the preseason training of 2017 season. He lost his position to Chinese international Zhao Mingjian and Zhang Chengdong after he returned to field in May 2017. In July 2017, Liao was loaned to fellow first-tier club Chongqing Lifan until 31 December 2017. He didn't appear for Chongqing throughout the entirety of his loan spell.

On 26 February 2018, Liao was loaned to China League One club Wuhan Zall for the 2018 season. He made his debut for the club on 11 March 2018, playing the whole 90 minutes in a 1–0 away win over Shanghai Shenxin. On 5 May 2018, he scored his first goal for Wuhan by shooting the equalizer in the injury time in a 2–2 away draw against Zhejiang Greentown. Liao played 29 league matches out of 30 in the 2018 season as Wuhan Zall won the title of the league and promoted to the first-tier. Liao made a permanent transfer to Wuhan Zall on 25 February 2019.

On 22 March 2022, Liao transferred to Chinese Super League club Meizhou Hakka. He would go on to make his debut in a league game on 4 June 2022 against Tianjin Jinmen Tiger in a 1-1 draw. This would be followed by his first goal for the club, which was in a league game on 12 November 2022 against Guangzhou City in a 1-0 victory. On 31 December 2025, Liao announced his departure after the 2025 season.

On 10 February 2026, Liao joined China League One club Guangdong GZ-Power for the 2026 season.

== Career statistics ==
As of 31 December 2023.

Appearances and goals by club, season and competition
Club	Season	League			National Cup		Continental		Other		Total	
Club	Season	Division	Apps	Goals	Apps	Goals	Apps	Goals	Apps	Goals	Apps	Goals
Dongguan Nancheng	2011	China League Two	19	2	-		-		-		19	2
Dongguan Nancheng	2012	China League Two	9	0	3	0	-		-		12	0
Dongguan Nancheng	Total		28	2	3	0	0	0	0	0	31	2
Guangdong Sunray Cave	2012	China League One	11	0	0	0	-		-		11	0
Guangdong Sunray Cave	2013	China League One	21	0	2	0	-		-		23	0
Guangdong Sunray Cave	2014	China League One	24	0	1	0	-		-		25	0
Guangdong Sunray Cave	Total		56	0	3	0	0	0	0	0	59	0
Hebei China Fortune	2015	China League One	21	0	3	0	-		-		24	0
Hebei China Fortune	2016	Chinese Super League	28	0	0	0	-		-		28	0
Hebei China Fortune	2017	Chinese Super League	0	0	0	0	-		-		0	0
Hebei China Fortune	Total		49	0	3	0	0	0	0	0	52	0
Chongqing Lifan (loan)	2017	Chinese Super League	0	0	0	0	-		-		0	0
Wuhan Zall (loan)	2018	China League One	29	1	0	0	-		-		29	1
Wuhan Zall	2019	Chinese Super League	24	0	0	0	-		-		24	0
Wuhan Zall	2020	Chinese Super League	18	1	0	0	-		1 (Note: Appearance(s) in CSL Relegation play-offs)	0	19	1
Wuhan Zall	2021	Chinese Super League	19	0	4	0	-		-		23	0
Wuhan Zall	Total		61	1	4	0	0	0	1	0	66	1
Meizhou Hakka	2022	Chinese Super League	29	2	1	0	-		-		30	2
Meizhou Hakka	2023	Chinese Super League	21	0	1	0	-		-		22	0
Meizhou Hakka	Total		50	2	2	0	0	0	0	0	52	2
Career total			245	6	15	0	0	0	1	0	261	6

== Honours ==
=== Club ===
Wuhan Zall

- China League One: 2018

Guangdong GZ-Power

- China League One: 2026
