= Yin Hongbo =

Chinese footballer

Yin Hongbo 尹鸿博
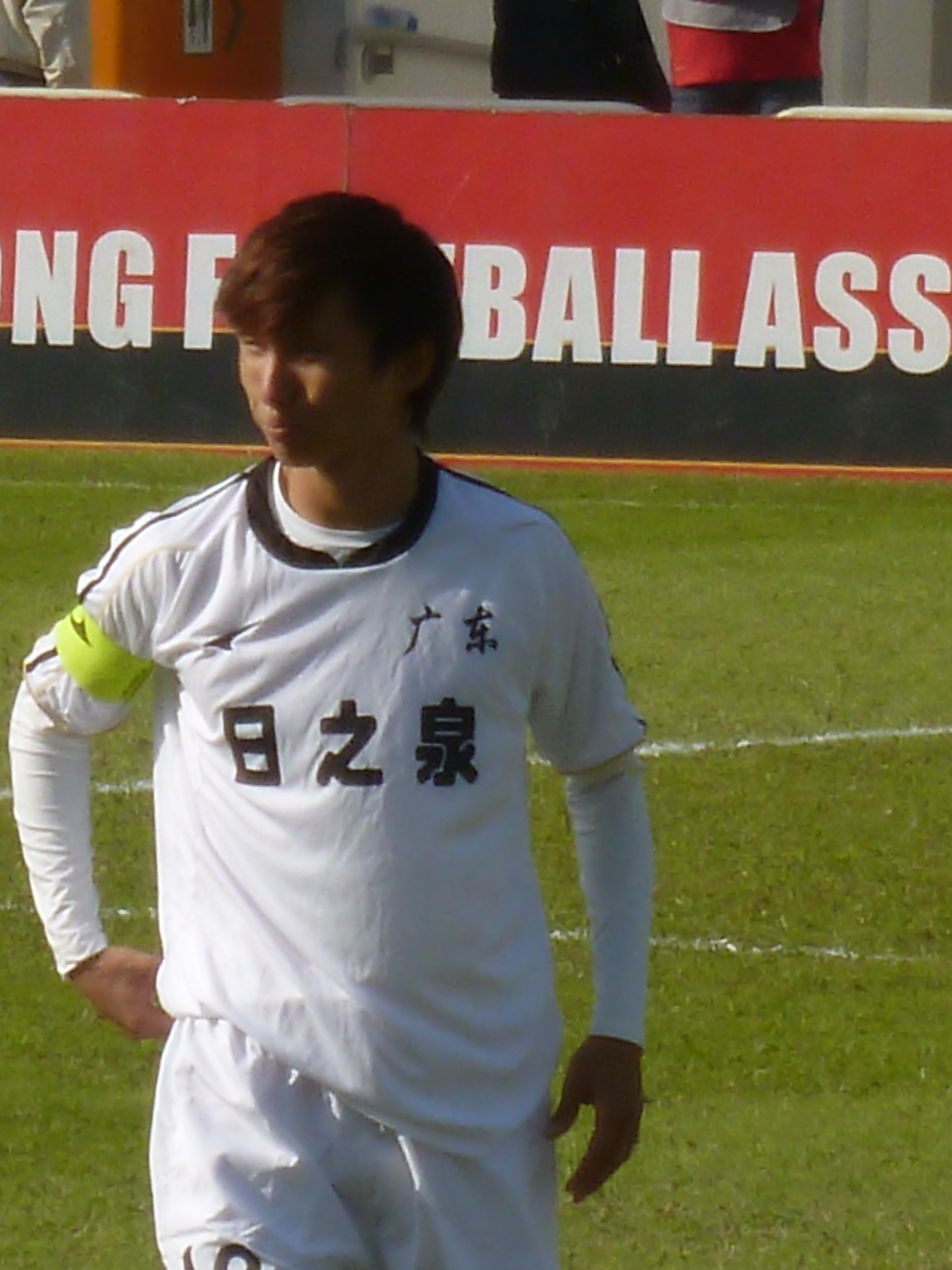
- Yin in 2013

Personal information
- Date of birth: 30 October 1989 (age 37)
- Place of birth: Changchun, Jilin, China
- Height: 1.78 m (5 ft 10 in)
- Position: Midfielder

Youth career
- 1999–2001: Tianjin Huochetou
- 2002: Haikou Pan America-Asia
- 2002–2003: Guangxi Hercules
- 2004–2006: Guangdong Youth

Senior career*
| Years | Team | Apps | (Gls) |
| 2007–2012 | Guangdong Sunray Cave | 113 | (31) |
| 2013–2016 | Henan Jianye | 86 | (8) |
| 2017–2021 | Hebei FC | 65 | (7) |
| 2022–2024 | Meizhou Hakka | 55 | (6) |
| 2025 | Henan FC | 2 | (0) |
| Total | | 321 | (52) |

International career
| 2017–2021 | China | 14 | (1) |

Managerial career
- 2026–: Henan FC U17
Medal record
Representing China
Men's football
EAFF Championship
| Bronze medal – third place | 2017 Japan | Team |
- * Club domestic league appearances and goals

Yin Hongbo
- Chinese: 尹鸿博
Transcriptions
Standard Mandarin
- Hanyu Pinyin: Yǐn Hóngbó
- IPA: [ìn xʊ̌ŋ pwǒ]

Yin Hongbo (Chinese: 尹鸿博; pinyin: Yǐn Hóngbó; born 30 October 1989) is a Chinese former professional footballer who played as a midfielder.

== Club career ==
Yin Hongbo started his football career with China League Two side Guangdong Sunray Cave in 2007. He played an integral role as the club won promotion to the second tier during the 2008 season. He was given the club's captaincy during the 2011 season after Li Zhihai was suspended by the club. In January 2013, Yin moved to China League One club Henan Jianye on a free transfer. He would go on to be part of the squad that won the division and promotion into the top tier at the end of the 2013 China League One campaign.

On 24 January 2017, Yin transferred to fellow Chinese Super League side Hebei China Fortune. He made his debut on 11 March 2017 in a 1–1 draw against Chongqing Lifan. He scored his first goal for the club on 8 April 2017 in a 4–2 win against Shanghai Shenhua.

After five seasons with the Hebei FC, on 11 April 2022 he joined newly promoted top-tier club Meizhou Hakka. He would go on to make his debut in a league game on 13 June 2022 against Shenzhen FC in a 2–1 victory. This would be followed by his first goal for the club, which was in a league game on 29 June 2022 against Cangzhou Mighty Lions in a 4–1 victory.

On 17 January 2025, Yin returned to his former club Henan FC.

On 22 November 2025, Yin officially retired from professional football after the last home game of 2025 season.

== International career ==
Yin made his debut for China national team on 10 January 2017 in a 2–0 loss against Iceland in the 2017 China Cup. He scored his first goal for China and assisted three times on 7 June 2017 in an 8–1 win against the Philippines.

== Coaching career ==
After retirement, Yin was appointed as the head coach of Henan FC U17.

== Personal life ==
Yin received a bachelor's degree at Keele University in the summer of 2017.

== Career statistics ==
=== Club ===
As of 31 December 2024

Appearances and goals by club, season and competition
| Club | Season | League | | | National cup | | Continental | | Other | | Total | |
| Club | Season | Division | Apps | Goals | Apps | Goals | Apps | Goals | Apps | Goals | Apps | Goals |
|---|---|---|---|---|---|---|---|---|---|---|---|---|
| Guangdong Sunray Cave | 2007 | China League Two | 12 | 2 | – | | – | | – | | 12 | 2 |
| Guangdong Sunray Cave | 2008 | China League Two | 17 | 5 | – | | – | | – | | 17 | 5 |
| Guangdong Sunray Cave | 2009 | China League One | 21 | 5 | – | | – | | – | | 21 | 5 |
| Guangdong Sunray Cave | 2010 | China League One | 10 | 1 | – | | – | | – | | 10 | 1 |
| Guangdong Sunray Cave | 2011 | China League One | 26 | 11 | 2 | 2 | – | | – | | 28 | 13 |
| Guangdong Sunray Cave | 2012 | China League One | 27 | 7 | 1 | 0 | – | | – | | 28 | 7 |
| Guangdong Sunray Cave | Total | | 113 | 31 | 3 | 2 | 0 | 0 | 0 | 0 | 116 | 33 |
| Henan Jianye | 2013 | China League One | 9 | 3 | 0 | 0 | – | | – | | 9 | 3 |
| Henan Jianye | 2014 | Chinese Super League | 22 | 1 | 1 | 0 | – | | – | | 23 | 1 |
| Henan Jianye | 2015 | Chinese Super League | 27 | 3 | 3 | 3 | – | | – | | 30 | 6 |
| Henan Jianye | 2016 | Chinese Super League | 28 | 1 | 4 | 4 | – | | – | | 32 | 5 |
| Henan Jianye | Total | | 86 | 8 | 8 | 7 | 0 | 0 | 0 | 0 | 94 | 15 |
| Hebei China Fortune | 2017 | Chinese Super League | 27 | 1 | 0 | 0 | – | | – | | 27 | 1 |
| Hebei China Fortune | 2018 | Chinese Super League | 1 | 0 | 0 | 0 | – | | – | | 1 | 0 |
| Hebei China Fortune | 2019 | Chinese Super League | 8 | 0 | 1 | 0 | – | | – | | 9 | 0 |
| Hebei China Fortune | 2020 | Chinese Super League | 14 | 2 | 0 | 0 | – | | – | | 14 | 2 |
| Hebei China Fortune | 2021 | Chinese Super League | 15 | 4 | 0 | 0 | – | | – | | 15 | 4 |
| Hebei China Fortune | Total | | 65 | 7 | 1 | 0 | 0 | 0 | 0 | 0 | 66 | 7 |
| Meizhou Hakka | 2022 | Chinese Super League | 28 | 4 | 1 | 0 | – | | – | | 29 | 4 |
| Meizhou Hakka | 2023 | Chinese Super League | 12 | 1 | 0 | 0 | – | | – | | 12 | 1 |
| Meizhou Hakka | 2024 | Chinese Super League | 15 | 1 | 0 | 0 | – | | – | | 15 | 1 |
| Meizhou Hakka | Total | | 55 | 6 | 1 | 0 | 0 | 0 | 0 | 0 | 56 | 6 |
| Career total | | | 319 | 52 | 13 | 9 | 0 | 0 | 0 | 0 | 332 | 61 |

=== International ===
Appearances and goals by national team and year
| National team | Year | Apps | Goals |
|---|---|---|---|
| China | 2017 | 8 | 1 |
| China | 2018 | 0 | 0 |
| China | 2019 | 0 | 0 |
| China | 2020 | 0 | 0 |
| China | 2021 | 6 | 0 |
| Total | | 14 | 1 |

Score and result list China's goal tally first, score column indicates score after Yin goal.

International goal scored by Yin Hongbo
| No. | Date | Venue | Opponent | Score | Result | Competition |
|---|---|---|---|---|---|---|
| 1 | 7 June 2017 | Tianhe Stadium, Guangzhou, China | Philippines | 5–1 | 8–1 | Friendly |

== Honours ==
Henan Jianye

- China League One: 2013
