= Shi Liang (footballer) =

Chinese footballer

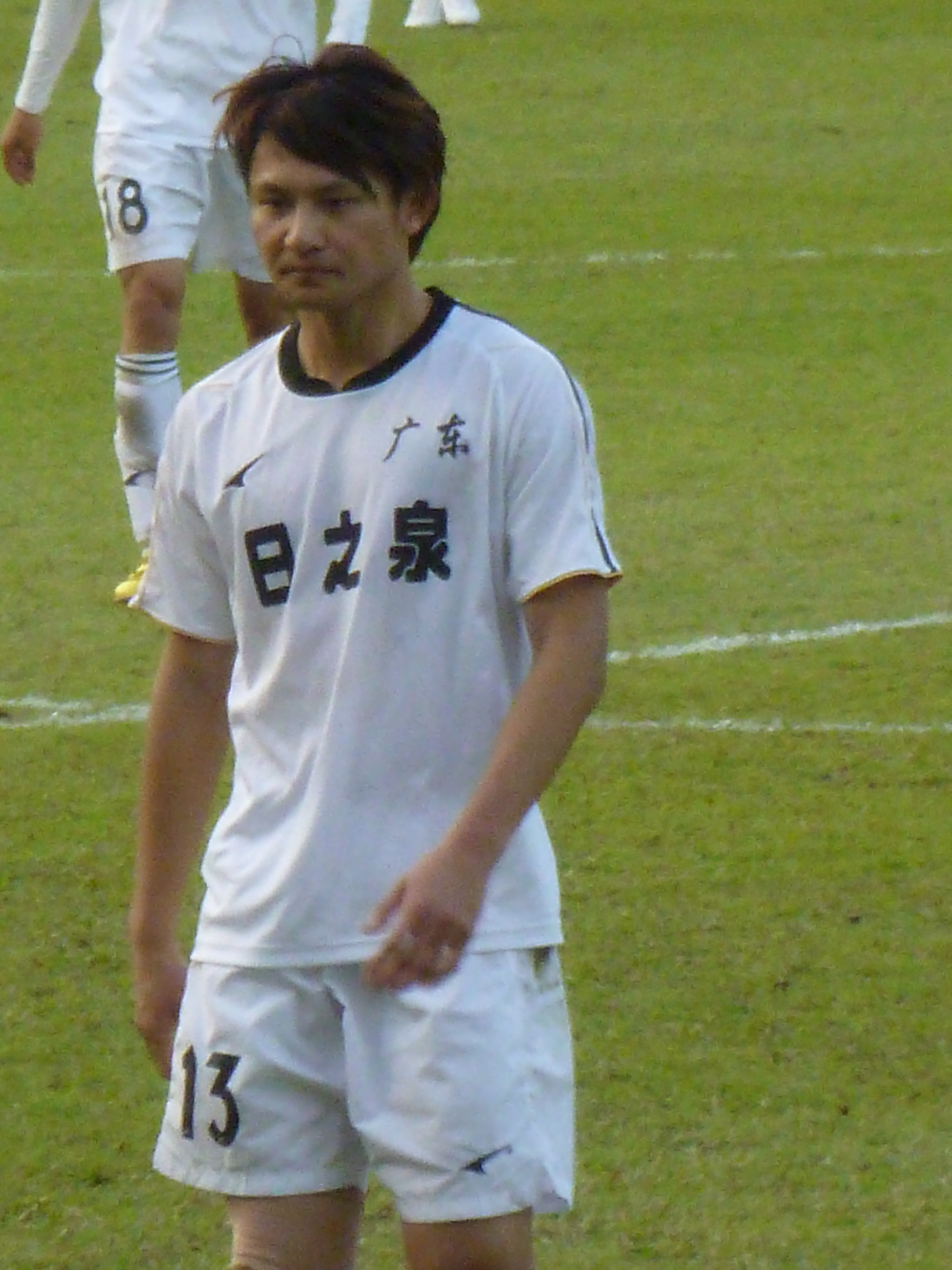

Personal information
- Date of birth: 11 May 1989 (age 37)
- Place of birth: Meizhou, Guangdong, China
- Height: 1.75 m (5 ft 9 in)
- Positions: Defensive midfielder; forward

Team information
- Current team: Foshan Nanshi
- Number: 37

Youth career
- 2004–2006: Guangdong Youth

Senior career*
Years	Team	Apps	(Gls)
2007–2012	Guangdong Sunray Cave	108	(15)
2013–2019	Beijing Renhe	87	(3)
2013–2014	→ Meizhou Kejia (loan)	26	(8)
2020–2024	Meizhou Hakka	120	(2)
2025–	Foshan Nanshi	24	(0)
- * Club domestic league appearances and goals as of 8 November 2025

Shi Liang (Chinese: 史亮; pinyin: Shǐ Liàng; born 11 May 1989) is a Chinese professional footballer who plays as a midfielder for China League One club Foshan Nanshi.

== Club career ==
Shi started his professional career with China League Two side Guangdong Sunray Cave in the 2007 league season. He scored one goal in four appearances as Guangdong Sunray Cave won promotion to the second tier at the end of the 2008 season. The following season he would help establish the club in the division and go on to be their top goalscorer with eight goals.

In February 2013, Shi moved to Chinese Super League side Guizhou Renhe on a free transfer. He would go on to make his debut for the club on 8 March 2013 in a league game against Qingdao Jonoon F.C. in a 2-1 defeat. Throughout the season he would struggle to establish himself within the team and was loaned out to third-tier club Meizhou Kejia for the remainder of the season and the whole of the 2014 league campaign. When Shi returned he was given more playing time, however at the end of the 2015 Chinese Super League campaign he was part of the team that was relegated at the end of the season. Shi would remain with Guizhou Renhe as they would move to Beijing and rename themselves Beijing Renhe on the 16 January 2016. By the 2017 league season Shi was converted to a defensive midfielder and helped guide the club to promotion back into the top tier at the end of the season.

On 13 February 2020, Shi would return to Meizhou, to join second tier club Meizhou Hakka. He would go on to make his debut in a league game on 13 September 2020 against Liaoning Shenyang Urban that ended in a 2-0 victory. After the game he would go on to establish himself as a vital member of the team that gained promotion to the top tier after coming second within the division at the end of the 2021 China League One campaign.

On 27 January 2025, Shi joined China League One club Foshan Nanshi.

== Career statistics ==
Statistics accurate as of match played 8 November 2025.

Club	Season	League			National Cup		Continental		Other		Total	
Club	Season	Division	Apps	Goals	Apps	Goals	Apps	Goals	Apps	Goals	Apps	Goals
Guangdong Sunray Cave	2007	China League Two	12	0	-		-		-		12	0
Guangdong Sunray Cave	2008	China League Two	4	1	-		-		-		4	1
Guangdong Sunray Cave	2009	China League One	20	8	-		-		-		20	8
Guangdong Sunray Cave	2010	China League One	22	0	-		-		-		22	0
Guangdong Sunray Cave	2011	China League One	22	0	2	0	-		-		24	0
Guangdong Sunray Cave	2012	China League One	28	6	1	0	-		-		29	6
Guangdong Sunray Cave	Total		108	15	3	0	0	0	0	0	111	15
Guizhou Renhe/ Beijing Renhe	2013	Chinese Super League	3	0	0	0	1	0	-		4	0
Guizhou Renhe/ Beijing Renhe	2015	Chinese Super League	14	0	3	0	-		-		17	0
Guizhou Renhe/ Beijing Renhe	2016	China League One	13	1	2	0	-		-		15	1
Guizhou Renhe/ Beijing Renhe	2017	China League One	24	2	0	0	-		-		24	2
Guizhou Renhe/ Beijing Renhe	2018	Chinese Super League	24	0	0	0	-		-		24	0
Guizhou Renhe/ Beijing Renhe	2019	Chinese Super League	9	0	0	0	-		-		9	0
Guizhou Renhe/ Beijing Renhe	Total		87	3	5	0	0	0	0	0	92	3
Meizhou Kejia (loan)	2013	China League Two	8	0	0	0	-		-		8	0
Meizhou Kejia (loan)	2014	China League Two	18	8	3	1	-		-		21	9
Meizhou Kejia (loan)	Total		26	8	3	1	0	0	0	0	29	9
Meizhou Hakka	2020	China League One	14	0	1	1	-		-		15	1
Meizhou Hakka	2021	China League One	27	1	0	0	-		-		27	1
Meizhou Hakka	2022	Chinese Super League	30	0	0	0	-		-		30	0
Meizhou Hakka	2023	Chinese Super League	26	1	1	0	-		-		27	1
Meizhou Hakka	2024	Chinese Super League	23	0	0	0	-		-		23	0
Meizhou Hakka	Total		120	2	2	1	0	0	0	0	122	3
Foshan Nanshi	2025	China League One	24	0	0	0	-		-		24	0
Career total			365	28	13	2	1	0	0	0	379	30
