= 32nd Guangdong–Hong Kong Cup =

- Event: Guangdong–Hong Kong Cup
Hong Kong	Guangdong
2	3

First leg
Hong Kong	Guangdong
2	1
- Date: 29 December 2009
- Venue: Siu Sai Wan Sports Ground, Hong Kong
- Referee: Charlton Wong (Hong Kong)
- Attendance: 1,603
- Weather: Very light rain

Second leg
Guangdong	Hong Kong
2	0
- Date: 2 January 2010
- Venue: Zhaoqing Sports Center, Zhaoqing
- Referee: He Zhibiao (China PR)
- Attendance: 2,000
- Weather: Heavy rain

The 32nd Guangdong–Hong Kong Cup was held in December 2009 and January 2010. The first leg was played at Siu Sai Wan Sports Ground on 29 December, with the second leg to take place at Zhaoqing Sports Center on 2 January.

Hong Kong won Guangdong 2–1 in the first leg with Julius Akosah scoring two goals in his first game for Hong Kong. However, Guangdong won the second leg 2–0 with Li Jian scoring two goals. Guangdong, with a final aggregate score of 2–3, won the Guangdong-Hong Kong Cup and denied Hong Kong the chance to win the Cup for four consecutive times.

== Squads ==
=== Guangdong ===
The squad, consisting of players from Guangdong Sunray Cave and Guangzhou Pharmaceutical, was announced in December 2009.

Manager: (China) Cao Yang

No.	Pos.	Player	Date of birth (age)	Caps	Club
1	GK	(China) Li Weijun	1 December 1981 (aged 28)		(China) Guangdong Sunray Cave
3	DF	(China) Guo Zichao	25 January 1989 (aged 20)		(China) Guangzhou Pharmaceutical
4	DF	(China) Chen Jianlong	14 May 1989 (aged 20)		(China) Guangzhou Pharmaceutical
7	DF	(China) Xu Weilong	16 June 1989 (aged 20)		(China) Guangzhou Pharmaceutical
9	MF	(China) Chen Xu	15 July 1982 (aged 27)		(China) Guangdong Sunray Cave
10	MF	(China) Pan Jia	1 October 1989 (aged 20)		(China) Guangdong Sunray Cave
11	FW	(China) Cong Tianhao	14 March 1989 (aged 20)		(China) Guangdong Sunray Cave
12	DF	(China) Huang Jiaqiang	14 March 1990 (aged 19)		(China) Guangzhou Pharmaceutical
13	FW	(China) Shi Liang	11 May 1989 (aged 20)		(China) Guangdong Sunray Cave
14	MF	(China) Tan Binliang	4 November 1989 (aged 20)		(China) Guangdong Sunray Cave
15	MF	(China) Zhao Huang	2 January 1989 (aged 20)		(China) Guangdong Sunray Cave
16	MF	(China) Li Jian	1 March 1989 (aged 20)		(China) Guangdong Sunray Cave
17	MF	(China) Yu Jianfeng	29 January 1989 (aged 20)		(China) Guangdong Sunray Cave
18	MF	(China) Yin Hongbo	30 October 1989 (aged 20)		(China) Guangdong Sunray Cave
19	DF	(China) Wang Chao	19 December 1989 (aged 20)		(China) Guangdong Sunray Cave
21	DF	(China) Liu Yuchen	3 October 1989 (aged 20)		(China) Guangdong Sunray Cave
23	GK	(China) Zhi Silong	7 February 1989 (aged 20)		(China) Guangdong Sunray Cave
28	MF	(China) Ye Weichao	18 February 1989 (aged 20)		(China) Guangzhou Pharmaceutical
36	DF	(China) Zhao Wei	23 January 1985 (aged 24)		(China) Guangdong Sunray Cave

=== Hong Kong ===
The squad was announced on 21 December 2009, which did not feature players from South China, TSW Pegasus, NT Realty Wofoo Tai Po and Tai Chung.

Manager: (Hong Kong) Yan Lik Kin

No.	Pos.	Player	Date of birth (age)	Caps	Club
1	GK	(Hong Kong) Tse Tak Him	10 February 1985 (age 24)		(Hong Kong) Citizen
2	DF	(Hong Kong) Sham Kwok Fai	30 May 1984 (age 25)		(Hong Kong) Citizen
3	DF	(Hong Kong) Fung Kai Hong	25 January 1986 (age 23)		(Hong Kong) Citizen
4	DF	(Hong Kong) Pak Wing Chak	23 April 1990 (age 19)		(Hong Kong) Sun Hei
5	DF	(Hong Kong) Iu Wai	9 November 1991 (age 18)		(Hong Kong) Fourway Rangers
6	DF	(Hong Kong) Yeung Chi Lun	20 November 1989 (age 20)		(Hong Kong) Citizen
8	MF	(Hong Kong) Xu Deshuai	12 JUne 1987 (age 22)		(Hong Kong) Citizen
9	FW	(Hong Kong) Julius Akosah	16 December 1982 (age 27)		(Hong Kong) Sun Hei
10	MF	(Hong Kong) Chan Yiu Lun	20 July 1982 (age 27)		(Hong Kong) Sun Hei
11	FW	(Hong Kong) Lam Hok Hei	18 September 1991 (age 18)		(Hong Kong) Fourway Rangers
12	DF	(Hong Kong) Lo Kwan Yee	9 October 1984 (age 25)		(Hong Kong) Kitchee
19	FW	(Hong Kong) Cheng Lai Hin	31 March 1986 (age 23)		(Hong Kong) Kitchee
20	DF	(Hong Kong) Li Hang Wui	15 February 1985 (age 24)		(Hong Kong) Kitchee
21	DF	(Hong Kong) Tsang Kam To	21 June 1989 (age 20)		(Hong Kong) Kitchee
22	GK	(Hong Kong) Leung Hing Kit	22 October 1989 (age 20)		(Hong Kong) Fourway Rangers
23	MF	(Hong Kong) Lam Ka Wai	5 June 1985 (age 24)		(Hong Kong) Kitchee
25	DF	(Hong Kong) So Wai Chuen	26 March 1988 (age 21)		(Hong Kong) Sun Hei
26	DF	(Hong Kong) Tse Man Wing	5 January 1983 (age 26)		(Hong Kong) Sun Hei
28	MF	(Hong Kong) Ip Chung Long	16 November 1989 (age 20)		(Hong Kong) Kitchee
	DF	(Hong Kong) Chan Siu Yuen	2 November 1987 (age 22)		(Hong Kong) Fourway Rangers
	DF	(Hong Kong) Chan Cham Hei	13 June 1991 (age 18)		(Hong Kong) Fourway Rangers
	DF	(Hong Kong) Ma Siu Kwan	28 March 1991 (age 18)		(Hong Kong) Happy Valley
	DF	(Hong Kong) Fong Pak Lun	14 April 1993 (age 16)		(Hong Kong) Sham Shui Po
	MF	(Hong Kong) Hung Ying Yip	26 April 1992 (age 17)		(Hong Kong) Sham Shui Po
	MF	(Hong Kong) Tam Lok Hin	12 January 1991 (age 18)		(Hong Kong) Citizen
	FW	(Hong Kong) Yu Ho Pong	19 August 1989 (age 20)		(Hong Kong) Happy Valley

== Match details ==
=== First leg ===
29 December 2009
19:30 HKT

Hong Kong	2 – 1	Guangdong
Akosah 28', 90'	Report by HKFA	Yin Hongbo 55'

Siu Sai Wan Sports Ground, Hong Kong
Attendance: 1,603
Referee: Charlton Wong (Hong Kong)

Hong Kong	Guangdong

HONG KONG:
GK	1	Tse Tak Him
RB	2	Sham Kwok Fai
CB	25	So Wai Chuen
CB	20	Li Hang Wui
LB	26	Tse Man Wing
DM	3	Fung Kai Hong	(yellow card) 46'	(substituted off) 84'
RM	8	Xu Deshuai		(substituted off) 90'
CM	10	Chan Yiu Lun (c)		(substituted off) 66'
CM	23	Lam Ka Wai		(substituted off) 77'
LM	12	Lo Kwan Yee
CF	9	Julius Akosah		(substituted off) 93'
Substitutes:
GK	22	Leung Hing Kit
DF	4	Pak Wing Chak
DF	5	Iu Wai		(substituted on) 84'
DF	21	Tsang Kam To		(substituted on) 66'
MF	28	Ip Chung Long		(substituted on) 93'
FW	11	Lam Hok Hei		(substituted on) 90'
FW	19	Cheng Lai Hin		(substituted on) 77'
Coach:
(Hong Kong) Yan Lik Kin

GUANGDONG:
GK	1	Li Weijun
RB	19	Wang Chao	(yellow card) 24'
CB	3	Guo Zichao
CB	4	Chen Jianlong
LB	21	Liu Yuchen
CM	18	Yin Hongbo
CM	10	Pan Jia (c)
CM	16	Li Jian		(substituted off) 57'
RF	14	Tan Binliang		(substituted off) 88'
CF	13	Shi Liang		(substituted off) 57'
LF	28	Ye Weichao
Substitutes:
GK	23	Zhi Silong
DF	7	Xu Weilong
DF	12	Huang Jiaqiang
DF	36	Zhao Wei
MF	15	Zhao Huang		(substituted on) 88'
MF	17	Yu Jianfeng		(substituted on) 57'
FW	11	Cong Tianhao		(substituted on) 57'
Coach:
(China) Cao Yang

=== Second leg ===
2 January 2010
15:00 CST

Guangdong	2 – 0	Hong Kong
Li Jian 14', 64'	Report by HKFA

Zhaoqing Sports Center, Zhaoqing
Attendance: 2,000
Referee: He Zhibiao (China PR)

Guangdong	Hong Kong

GUANGDONG:
GK	1	Li Weijun
RB	7	Xu Weilong		(substituted off) 79'
CB	3	Guo Zichao
CB	36	Zhao Wei
LB	21	Liu Yuchen	(yellow card) 32'
CM	18	Yin Hongbo		(substituted off) 53'
CM	10	Pan Jia (c)
CM	16	Li Jian
RF	14	Tan Binliang		(substituted off) 46'
CF	13	Shi Liang
LF	28	Ye Weichao		(substituted off) 89'
Substitutes:
GK	23	Zhi Silong
DF	12	Huang Jiaqiang		(substituted on) 79'
DF	19	Wang Chao
MF	9	Chen Xu		(substituted on) 53'
MF	15	Zhao Huang
MF	17	Yu Jianfeng		(substituted on) 46'
FW	11	Cong Tianhao		(substituted on) 89'
Coach:
(China) Cao Yang

HONG KONG:
GK	1	Tse Tak Him
RB	2	Sham Kwok Fai
CB	25	So Wai Chuen
CB	20	Li Hang Wui
LB	26	Tse Man Wing
DM	3	Fung Kai Hong		(substituted off) 83'
RM	21	Tsang Kam To
CM	10	Chan Yiu Lun (c)	(yellow card) 31'	(substituted off) 69'
CM	23	Lam Ka Wai		(substituted off) 75'
LM	12	Lo Kwan Yee
CF	9	Julius Akosah	(yellow card) 34' (yellow-red card) 61'
Substitutes:
GK	22	Leung Hing Kit
DF	4	Pak Wing Chak
DF	5	Iu Wai
DF	6	Yeung Chi Lun		(substituted on) 83'
MF	8	Xu Deshuai		(substituted on) 69'
MF	28	Ip Chung Long
FW	19	Cheng Lai Hin		(substituted on) 75'
Coach:
(Hong Kong) Yan Lik Kin
