= 2010–11 in Hong Kong football =

The 2010–11 season in Hong Kong football, starting July 2010 and ending June 2011.

== Overview ==
- In July 2010, Birmingham City F.C. played an exhibition match in Hong Kong.
- 22 January 2011: Ng Wai Chiu returned to Hong Kong First Division League and joined South China.

== Representative team ==
=== Hong Kong ===
==== Friendly matches in first half season ====
4 October 2010	India	0 – 1	Hong Kong	Balewadi Stadium, Pune, India
18:00 UTC+5.5		Goal.com Report	Li Haiqiang 76'	Attendance: 10,000; Referee: Pratap Singh (India)

India	Hong Kong

India:
GK	1	Subrata Paul
CB	19	Gouramangi Moirangthem Singh
CB	2	Anwar Ali
CB	13	Irungbam Surkumar Singh
RWB	16	Clifford Miranda		(substituted off) 65'
DM	14	Anthony Pereira
DM	26	Mehrajuddin Wadoo	(yellow card) 40'	(substituted off) 79'
LWB	30	Climax Lawrence (c)		(substituted off) 78'
RF	22	Syed Rahim Nabi
LF	11	Sunil Chhetri
CF	9	Abhishek Yadav		(substituted off) 65'
Substitutions:
GK	23	Arindam Bhattacharya
DF	12	Deepak Kumar Mondal
DF	34	Moirangthem Govin Singh
MF	23	Steven Dias		(substituted in) 65'
FW	8	P. Renedy Singh		(substituted in) 78'
FW	18	Sushil Kumar Singh		(substituted in) 65'
FW	27	Baldeep Singh Jr.		(substituted in) 79'
Manager:
(England) Bob Houghton

Hong Kong:
GK	1	Tse Tak Him
RB	18	Sham Kwok Fai	(substituted off) 46'
CB	2	Lee Chi Ho
CB	15	Chan Wai Ho
LB	3	Poon Yiu Cheuk
DM	5	Bai He
CM	16	Leung Chun Pong	(substituted off) 90'
RM	12	Lo Kwan Yee	(substituted off) 61'
LM	8	Lee Hong Lim	(substituted off) 72'
AM	11	Li Haiqiang (c)
CF	20	Ye Jia
Substitutions:
GK	1	Li Hon Ho
DF	4	Lee Wai Lun	(substituted in) 46'
DF	13	Cheung Kin Fung
DF	14	Li Hang Wui	(substituted in) 90'
FW	7	Sham Kwok Keung
FW	9	Lee Wai Lim	(substituted in) 72'
FW	19	Chu Siu Kei	(substituted in) 61'
Manager:
Tsang Wai Chung

17 November 2010	Hong Kong	0 – 7	Paraguay	Hong Kong Stadium, Hong Kong
18:00 UTC+8		Report	Santa Cruz 4', 33'; É. Barreto 31'; Ortigoza 46', 55'; M. Riveros 74'; C. Riveros 90+2'	Attendance: 6,250

Match Detail

Hong Kong	Paraguay

Hong Kong:
GK	28	Zhang Chunhui		(substituted off) 46'
RB	22	Sham Kwok Fai		(substituted off) 76'
CB	2	Lee Chi Ho
CB	24	Deng Jinghuang		(substituted off) 60'
LB	3	Poon Yiu Cheuk (c)
DM	5	Bai He
CM	16	Leung Chun Pong		(substituted off) 76'
RM	12	Lo Kwan Yee
LM	8	Lee Hong Lim		(substituted off) 46'
AM	23	Chu Siu Kei		(substituted off) 46'
CF	20	Ye Jia
Substitutions:
GK	17	Tse Tak Him		(substituted in) 46'
DF	4	Lee Wai Lun		(substituted in) 46'
DF	13	Cheung Kin Fung
DF	15	Chan Wai Ho	Sent to blood bin
DF	25	Gerard Ambassa Guy		(substituted in) 60'
MF	10	Lam Ka Wai		(substituted in) 76'
MF	11	Li Haiqiang
MF	18	Kwok Kin Pong		(substituted in) 46'
MF	21	So Loi Keung
FW	9	Lee Wai Lim
FW	31	Cheng Lai Hin		(substituted in) 76'
Manager:
Tsang Wai Chung

Paraguay:
GK	1	Justo Villar (c)
RB	6	Osmar Molinas	(substituted off) 60'
CB	5	Antolín Alcaraz	(substituted off) 69'
CB	14	Paulo da Silva
LB	17	Aureliano Torres
DM	13	Enrique Vera	(substituted off) 58'
RM	7	Hernan Perez	(substituted off) 69'
CM	16	Cristian Riveros
LM	8	Edgar Barreto	(substituted off) 58'
SS	10	Nestor Camacho	(substituted off) 46'
CF	9	Roque Santa Cruz
Substitutions:
GK	12	Joel Silva
DF	3	Luis Cabral	(substituted in) 69'
DF	4	Tomás Bartoméus	(substituted in) 58'
MF	2	Marcos Riveros	(substituted in) 58'
MF	15	Celso Ortiz	(substituted in) 60'
FW	11	Federico Santander	(substituted in) 69'
FW	18	Jose Ortigoza	(substituted in) 46'
Manager:
Gerardo Martino

21 November 2010	Indonesia	Cancelled	Hong Kong	Gelora Bung Karno Stadium, Jakarta, Indonesia
20:00 UTC+7

==== 2011 Guangdong–Hong Kong Cup ====
1 January 2010	Guangdong (China)	3 – 1	Hong Kong	Guangdong People's Stadium, Guangzhou
15:00 CST	Li Jianhua 6'; Yuan Lin 10'; Huang Fengtao 70'	Report	Lo Kwan Yee 51'	Attendance: 8,000; Referee: He Zhibiao

Match Detail

Guangdong	Hong Kong

GUANGDONG:
GK	1	Li Weijun
RB	2	Li Zhihai
CB	12	Li Jianhua
CB	6	Yuan Lin (c)
LB	20	Zhu Cong
RM	14	Tan Binliang		(substituted off) 57'
CM	26	Li Yan
CM	10	Pan Jia
LM	18	Yin Hongbo		(substituted off) 74'
RF	13	Shi Liang	(yellow card) 36'
LF	25	Huang Fengtao		(substituted off) 85'
Substitutes:
GK	23	Zhang Xunwei
DF	3	Liu Cheng
DF	19	Wang Chao
DF	21	Liu Yuchen
MF	15	Zhao Huang
MF	16	Li Jian		(substituted in) 74'
FW	11	Cong Tianhao		(substituted in) 85'
FW	28	Ye Weichao		(substituted in) 57'
Coach:
Cao Yang

HONG KONG:
GK	1	Zhang Chunhui
RB	12	Lo Kwan Yee
CB	2	Lee Chi Ho	(yellow card) 36'
CB	15	Chan Wai Ho
LB	3	Poon Yiu Cheuk
DM	5	Bai He	(yellow card) 45'
AM	24	Ju Yingzhi		(substituted off) 34'
AM	11	Li Haiqiang (c)		(substituted off) 83'
RF	7	Chan Siu Ki	(yellow card) 45'
LF	18	Kwok Kin Pong	(yellow card) 59'
CF	20	Ye Jia		(substituted off) 61'
Substitutions:
GK	17	Tse Tak Him
DF	4	Deng Jinghuang
DF	6	Gerard Ambassa Guy		(substituted in) 83'
DF	18	Sham Kwok Fai	(yellow card) 63'	(substituted in) 34'
MF	10	Lam Ka Wai
MF	23	Chu Siu Kei
FW	9	Lee Wai Lim
FW	14	Sham Kwok Keung
FW	25	Cheng Lai Hin	(yellow card) 67'	(substituted in) 61'
Manager:
Tsang Wai Chung

4 January 2010	Hong Kong	1 – 1	(China) Guangdong	Hong Kong Stadium, Hong Kong
20:00 HKT	Sham Kwok Keung 59'	Report	Li Jian 45+'	Attendance: 3,175

Match Detail

Hong Kong	Guangdong

HONG KONG:
GK	1	Tse Tak Him
RB	18	Sham Kwok Fai	(yellow card) 18'	(substituted off) 72'
CB	2	Lee Chi Ho
CB	15	Chan Wai Ho
LB	3	Poon Yiu Cheuk (c)		(substituted off) 67'
DM	5	Bai He
AM	12	Lo Kwan Yee	(yellow card) 22'
AM	11	Li Haiqiang
RF	7	Chan Siu Ki		(substituted off) 81'
LF	18	Kwok Kin Pong		(substituted off) 81'
CF	14	Sham Kwok Keung
Substitutions:
GK	1	Zhang Chunhui
DF	4	Deng Jinghuang		(substituted in) 67'
DF	6	Gerard Ambassa Guy		(substituted in) 72'
MF	10	Lam Ka Wai
MF	23	Chu Siu Kei		(substituted in) 81'
MF	24	Ju Yingzhi
FW	9	Lee Wai Lim
FW	20	Ye Jia
FW	25	Cheng Lai Hin		(substituted in) 81'
Manager:
Tsang Wai Chung

GUANGDONG:
GK	1	Li Weijun
RB	2	Li Zhihai
CB	12	Li Jianhua
CB	6	Yuan Lin (c)
LB	20	Zhu Cong
RM	16	Li Jian	(substituted off) 65'
CM	26	Li Yan
CM	10	Pan Jia
LM	18	Yin Hongbo	(substituted off) 75'
RF	13	Shi Liang	(substituted off) 79'
LF	25	Huang Fengtao	(substituted off) 90+'
Substitutes:
GK	23	Zhang Xunwei
DF	3	Liu Cheng
DF	21	Liu Yuchen	(substituted in) 90+'
MF	14	Tan Binliang	(substituted in) 75'
MF	15	Zhao Huang
FW	11	Cong Tianhao	(substituted in) 79'
FW	28	Ye Weichao	(substituted in) 65'
Coach:
Cao Yang

==== Friendly matches in second half season ====
9 February 2011	Malaysia	2 – 0	Hong Kong	Shah Alam Stadium, Kuala Lumpur
20:45 UTC+8	Safiq 44'; Amirul 90+1'	Report

3 June 2011	Hong Kong	1 – 1	Malaysia	Siu Sai Wan Sports Ground, Hong Kong
20:00 UTC+8	Chan Siu Ki 60'		Abdul Hadi Yahya 66'	Attendance: 586

=== Hong Kong U-23 ===
==== Friendly against Australia ====
28 September 2010	Hong Kong	2 – 2	Australia	Sai Tso Wan Recreation Ground, Hong Kong
14:00 UTC+8	Chao Pengfei 16'; Chan Ka Chun 90'	HKFA News (Chi)	Hamill 5'; Babalj 75'	Attendance: 100; Referee: Wong Po On (Hong Kong)

Match Detail

Hong Kong	Australia

Hong Kong:
GK	1	Tse Tak Him
RB	2	Sham Kwok Fai
CB	5	Chan Wai Ho (c)
CB	21	Lai Man Fei
LB	15	Pak Wing Chak
DM	4	Yuen Kin Man
AM	14	Ju Yingzhi
AM	16	Tam Lok Hin
RW	18	Cheng King Ho
LW	12	Ip Chung Long
CF	16	Chao Pengfei
Substitutions:
		To be Confirmed
Manager:
Tsang Wai Chung

Australia:
To be Confirmed
Substitutions:
To be Confirmed
Manager:
(Netherlands) Jan Versleijen

Assistant referees:
Unknown (Hong Kong)
Unknown (Hong Kong)
Fourth official:
None

==== Long Teng Cup ====
This is a tournament was organized by Chinese Taipei Football Association and take place in Kaohsiung, Taiwan from 8 to 12 October 2010. Another three participating teams is Chinese Taipei, the Philippines and Macau. The players of Hong Kong were selected for 2010 Asian Games and another three associations sent their senior teams. FIFA ensured that these 3 matches are the formal international matches after the tournament.

The first match of Hong Kong team was against the Philippines on 8 October. However, the heavy rain flooded the field, so the ball flow on the water and could not be kick. The match was abandoned at 14th-minute. The rematch played on 9 October, Hong Kong defeated the Philippines by 4–2.

8 October 2010	Hong Kong	Abandoned	Philippines	Kaohsiung National Stadium, Kaohsiung
17:00 UTC+8				Attendance: 400; Referee: Kao Jung-fang (Chinese Taipei)

Match Detail

Hong Kong	Philippines

Hong Kong:
GK	1	Yapp Hung Fai
RB	16	Chak Ting Fung
CB	2	Chan Wai Ho
CB	5	Lai Man Fei
LB	3	Pak Wing Chak
DM	15	Chan Wai Ho (c)
AM	12	Lo Kwan Yee
AM	24	Ju Yingzhi
RW	8	Xu Deshuai
SS	13	Chan Man Fai
LF	9	Chao Pengfei
Substitutions:
		None
Manager:
Tsang Wai Chung

Philippines:
GK	22	Eduard Sacapaño
SW	11	Alexander Borromeo (c)
RB	4	Anton del Rosario
CB	26	David Basa
CB	3	Jerry Barbaso
LB	2	Rob Gier
DM	6	Roel Gener
DM	7	James Younghusband
AM	19	Nestorio Margarse
RF	23	Ian Araneta
LF	13	Emelio Caligdong
Substitutions:
		None
Manager:
(England) Simon McMenemy

Assistant referees:
Kuo Chan-yu (Chinese Taipei)
Lee Hung-ping (Chinese Taipei)
Fourth official:
Tseng Chien-wen (Chinese Taipei)

9 October 2010	Hong Kong	4 – 2	Philippines	Kaohsiung National Stadium, Kaohsiung
17:00 UTC+8	Chan Man Fai 5'; Xu Deshuai 31'; Lo Kwan Yee 84'; Ju Yingzhi 90+'	Report (Chi)	P. Younghusband 57' (pen.), 69'	Attendance: 600; Referee: Kao Jung-fang (Chinese Taipei)

Match Detail

Hong Kong	Philippines

Hong Kong:
GK	1	Yapp Hung Fai
RB	16	Chak Ting Fung
CB	2	Lee Chi Ho
CB	5	Lai Man Fei		(substituted off) 70'
LB	3	Pak Wing Chak	(yellow card) 51'	(substituted off) 56'
DM	15	Chan Wai Ho (c)
AM	12	Lo Kwan Yee
AM	24	Ju Yingzhi
RW	8	Xu Deshuai		(substituted off) 61'
SS	13	Chan Man Fai	(yellow card) 48'	(substituted off) 81'
LF	9	Chao Pengfei
Substitutions:
DF	14	Chan Siu Yuen		(substituted in) 70'
DF	21	Tsang Chi Hau	(yellow card) 58'	(substituted in) 56'
MF	23	Lam Hok Hei		(substituted in) 61'
MF	25	Tam Lok Hin		(substituted in) 81'
Manager:
Tsang Wai Chung

Philippines:
GK	22	Eduard Sacapaño
SW	11	Alexander Borromeo (c)
RB	4	Anton del Rosario
CB	26	David Basa
CB	3	Jerry Barbaso	(substituted off) 49'
LB	2	Rob Gier
DM	6	Roel Gener
DM	7	James Younghusband	(substituted off) 89'
AM	17	Jason de Jong
RF	23	Ian Araneta	(substituted off) 77'
LF	13	Emelio Caligdong
Substitutions:
MF	10	Phil Younghusband	(substituted in) 49'
MF	19	Nestorio Margarse	(substituted in) 89'
FW	9	Yanti Barsales	(substituted in) 77'
Manager:
(England) Simon McMenemy

Assistant referees:
Kuo Chan-yu (Chinese Taipei)
Lee Hung-ping (Chinese Taipei)
Fourth official:
Tseng Chien-wen (Chinese Taipei)

10 October 2010	Macau	0 – 4	Hong Kong	Kaohsiung National Stadium, Kaohsiung
17:00 UTC+8		Report (Chi)	Tam Lok Hin 38'; Xu Deshuai 52'; Lam Hok Hei 72', 74'	Attendance: 1,200; Referee: Yu Ming-tsun (Chinese Taipei)

Match Detail

Macau	Hong Kong

Macau:
GK	1	Liu Kin Chou
RB	12	Lee Keng Pan	(substituted off) 77'
CB	16	Lei Ka Him
CB	8	Cheng Ieong Paulo Cheang
LB	13	Tang Ho Fai
CM	26	David Caroso
CM	20	Lei Kam Hou	(substituted off) 45'
RW	10	Lui Wai Hung	(substituted off) 75'
AM	5	Vervon Wong
LW	9	Chan Kin Seng (c)	(substituted off) 87'
CF	30	Chong Chi Chio	(substituted off) 68'
Substitutions:
DF	15	Cheng Ka Wai	(substituted in) 87'
MF	4	Lei Ka Hei	(substituted in) 74'
MF	7	Chao Wai Hou	(substituted in) 45'
FW	6	Leong Ka Hang	(substituted in) 68'
FW	17	Sio Ka Un	(substituted in) 77'
Manager:
(Hong Kong) Leung Sui Wing

Hong Kong:
GK	19	Leung Hing Kit
RB	16	Chak Ting Fung		(substituted off) 58'
CB	15	Chan Wai Ho (c)
CB	21	Tsang Chi Hau		(substituted off) 35'
LB	25	Tam Lok Hin
DM	14	Chan Siu Yuen
RM	18	Cheng King Ho		(substituted off) 54'
AM	12	Lo Kwan Yee		(substituted off) 65'
AM	24	Ju Yingzhi		(substituted off) 46'
LM	23	Lam Hok Hei	(yellow card) 86'
CF	13	Chan Man Fai		(substituted off) 72'
Substitutions:
DF	3	Pak Wing Chak		(substituted in) 58'
MF	4	Yuen Kin Man		(substituted in) 65'
MF	8	Xu Deshuai		(substituted in) 46'
MF	11	Lai Yiu Cheong		(substituted in) 35'
MF	20	Lau Nim Yat		(substituted in) 72'
FW	9	Chao Pengfei		(substituted in) 54'
Manager:
Tsang Wai Chung

Assistant referees:
Tsai Chih-ming (Chinese Taipei)
Tseng Chieh-wen (Chinese Taipei)
Fourth official:
Kao Jung-fang (Chinese Taipei)

12 October 2010	Chinese Taipei	1 – 1	Hong Kong	Kaohsiung National Stadium, Kaohsiung
19:30 UTC+8	Lo Chih-an 40'	Report (Chi)	Lo Kwan Yee 75' (pen.)	Attendance: 3,000; Referee: Kao Tsai-hu (Chinese Taipei)

Match Detail

Chinese Taipei	Hong Kong

Chinese Taipei:
GK	1	Lu Kun-chi
RB	20	Chen Yu-lin		(substituted off) 79'
CB	4	Lin Cheng-yi	(yellow card) 64'
CB	14	Chiang Ming-han	(yellow card) 73'
LB	23	Chen Shan-fu
RM	12	Lo Chih-an	(yellow card) 40'
CM	5	Tsai Hsien-tang
CM	8	Chan Che-yuan
LM	11	Lo Chih-en
RF	17	Chen Po-liang (c)
LF	28	Wu Chun-ching		(substituted off) 52'
Substitutions:
DF	19	Kuo Chun-yi		(substituted in) 79'
FW	7	Chang Han		(substituted in) 52'
Manager:
Lo Chih-tsung

Hong Kong:
GK	1	Yapp Hung Fai
RB	16	Chak Ting Fung	(yellow card) 48'
CB	2	Lee Chi Ho
CB	5	Lai Man Fei|
LB	3	Pak Wing Chak
DM	15	Chan Wai Ho
RW	8	Xu Deshuai		(substituted off) 65'
AM	12	Lo Kwan Yee (c)
AM	13	Chan Man Fai		(substituted off) 31'
LM	23	Lam Hok Hei		(substituted off) 76'
CF	9	Chao Pengfei
Substitutions:
MF	20	Lau Nim Yat		(substituted in) 65'
MF	24	Ju Yingzhi		(substituted in) 31'
MF	25	Tam Lok Hin		(substituted in) 76'
Manager:
Tsang Wai Chung

Assistant referees:
Kuo Chan-Yu (Chinese Taipei)
Lin Jeng-chiou (Chinese Taipei)
Fourth official:
Lee Hung-pin (Chinese Taipei)

==== Friendly for Asian Games ====
2 November 2010	Hong Kong	0 – 4	(Hong Kong) South China	Siu Sai Wan Sports Ground, Hong Kong
20:00 UTC+8		News in Chinese	Carrijó 15', 31', 45'; Cheng Lai Hin 57'	Attendance: 300

Match Detail

Hong Kong	South China

Hong Kong:
GK	1	Yapp Hung Fai		(substituted off) 60'
RB	2	Lee Chi Ho (c)		(substituted off) 68'
CB	26	Tsang Kam To		(substituted off) 46'
CB	5	Lai Man Fei
LB	3	Pak Wing Chak	(yellow card) 31'	(substituted off) 52'
RM	23	Lam Hok Hei
CM	12	Lo Kwan Yee
CM	24	Ju Yingzhi
LM	13	Chan Man Fai
AM	10	Au Yeung Yiu Chung
LF	9	Chao Pengfei
Substitutions:
DF	25	So Wai Chuen		(substituted in) 46'
DF	14	Chan Siu Yuen		(substituted in) 52'
GK	19	Leung Hing Kit		(substituted in) 60'
MF	4	Yuen Kin Man		(substituted in) 68'
Manager:
Tsang Wai Chung

South China:
GK	23	(Hong Kong) Zhang Chunhui
RB	21	(Hong Kong) Man Pei Tak
CB	4	(Hong Kong) Chiu Chun Kit		(substituted off) 46'
CB	30	(Brazil) Joel Bertoti Padilha	(yellow card) 30'
LB	3	(Hong Kong) Poon Yiu Cheuk		(substituted off) 46'
DM	5	(Hong Kong) Bai He
RM	9	(Hong Kong) Lee Wai Lim		(substituted off) 46'
AM	11	(Hong Kong) Li Haiqiang (c)
LW	28	(Brazil) Tales Schutz
SS	26	(Brazil) Leandro Carrijó
CF	27	(Brazil) Giovane Alves da Silva		(substituted off) 46'
Substitutions:
DF	22	(Brazil) Willian Alves		(substituted in) 46'
MF	19	(Hong Kong) Hinson Leung		(substituted in) 46'
MF	25	(Brazil) Wellingsson de Souza		(substituted in) 46'
FW	31	(Hong Kong) Cheng Lai Hin		(substituted in) 46'
Manager:
(South Korea) Kim Pan-Gon

==== 2010 Asian Games ====
The 2010 Asian Games will play between 7 November and 27 November in Guangzhou, China.

7 November 2010	United Arab Emirates	1 – 1	Hong Kong	Huadu Stadium, Guangzhou
UTC+8 19:00	Mousa 37'	Report	Chan Man Fai 81'	Referee: Choi Myung-Yong (South Korea)

Match Detail

United Arab Emirates	Hong Kong

United Arab Emirates:
GK	1	Ali Khasif (c)
RB	20	Abdulaziz Hussain
CB	19	Mohamed Ahmed
CB	8	Hamdan Ismaeel
LB	3	Abdullah Mousa
RM	7	Mohamed Saeed	(yellow card) 43'	(substituted off) 56'
AM	5	Amer Abdulrahman
CM	18	Mohamed Fawzi
LM	10	Theyab Awana		(substituted off) 84'
SS	11	Ahmed Khalil		(substituted off) 78'
CF	9	Ahmed Ali
Substitutions:
GK	17	Adel Mohamed
GK	22	Ahmed Mahmoud
DF	2	Saad Surour
DF	6	Ali Salem
DF	14	Abdelaziz M. Sanqour
MF	23	Mohd Jalml
MF	25	Habosh Saleh		(substituted in) 84'
MF	27	Omar Abdulrahman	(yellow card) 62' (yellow-red card) 90'	(substituted in) 56'
FW	16	Saeed Salem		(substituted in) 78'
Manager:
Mahdi Ali Redha

Hong Kong:
GK	1	Yapp Hung Fai
RB	21	Tsang Kam To		(substituted off) 75'
CB	2	Lee Chi Ho
CB	15	Chan Wai Ho (c)
LB	16	Chak Ting Fung	(yellow card) 63'
RM	8	Xu Deshuai	(yellow card) 75'
CM	12	Lo Kwan Yee	(yellow card) 29'
DM	24	Ju Yingzhi
LM	18	Kwok Kin Pong
SS	10	Au Yeung Yiu Chung		(substituted off) 69'
CF	9	Chao Pengfei
Substitutions:
GK	19	Leung Hing Kit
DF	3	Pak Wing Chak
DF	5	Lai Man Fei
DF	14	Chan Siu Yuen
DF	25	So Wai Chuen
MF	4	Yuen Kin Man
MF	11	Lai Yiu Cheong
MF	13	Chan Man Fai		(substituted in) 69'
FW	23	Lam Hok Hei		(substituted in) 75'
Manager:
Tsang Wai Chung

Assistant referees:
Choi Min Byoung (South Korea)
Ibrahim Thaufeeq (Maldives)
Fourth official:
Vo Minh Tri (Vietnam)

9 November 2010	Uzbekistan	0 – 1	Hong Kong	Huadu Stadium, Guangzhou
UTC+8 19:00		Report	Chan Wai Ho 60'	Referee: Kadhum Auda (Iraq)

Match Detail

Uzbekistan	Hong Kong

Uzbekistan:
GK	1	Timur Juraev
RB	20	Islom Tuhtahujaev
CB	5	Dilyorbek Irmatov
CB	2	Sherzod Azamov
LB	4	Akmal Kholmurodov
CM	8	Sherzod Karimov
CM	7	Odil Ahmedov (c)
RW	14	Zokhir Pirimov		(substituted off) 66'
LW	18	Fozil Musaev	(yellow card) 29'
SS	9	Kenja Turaev		(substituted off) 71'
CF	17	Ivan Nagaev		(substituted off) 75'
Substitutions:
GK	12	Sanjar Kuvvatov
DF	6	Sunnatilla Mamadaliyev
DF	13	Ikboljon Bobokhanov
MF	15	Gulom Urunov		(substituted in) 66'
MF	16	Jasur Hasanov
MF	19	Sardor Mirzaev
FW	10	Davron Mirzaev		(substituted in) 71'
FW	11	Alisher Azizov		(substituted in) 75'
Manager:
Akhmad Ubaydullayev

Hong Kong:
GK	1	Yapp Hung Fai	(yellow card) 61'
RB	21	Tsang Kam To	(yellow card) 36'
CB	2	Lee Chi Ho
CB	15	Chan Wai Ho (c)
LB	16	Chak Ting Fung
RM	8	Xu Deshuai
CM	12	Lo Kwan Yee		(substituted off) 90'
DM	24	Ju Yingzhi
LM	18	Kwok Kin Pong	(yellow card) 45'
SS	10	Au Yeung Yiu Chung		(substituted off) 80'
CF	9	Chao Pengfei
Substitutions:
GK	19	Leung Hing Kit
DF	3	Pak Wing Chak
DF	5	Lai Man Fei
DF	14	Chan Siu Yuen		(substituted in) 90'
DF	25	So Wai Chuen		(substituted in) 80'
MF	4	Yuen Kin Man
MF	11	Lai Yiu Cheong
MF	13	Chan Man Fai
FW	23	Lam Hok Hei
Manager:
Tsang Wai Chung

Assistant referees:
Bin Ismail Azman (Kuwait)
Tang Yew Mun (Singapore)
Fourth official:
Sha'ban Ali (Kuwait)

11 November 2010	Hong Kong	4 – 1	Bangladesh	Huadu Stadium, Guangzhou
UTC+8 16:00	Au Yeung Yiu Chung 2', 33'; Ju Yingzhi 41'; Chan Man Fai 87'	Report	E. Hoque 24'	Referee: Saeid Mozaffarizadeh (Iran)

Match Detail

Hong Kong	Bangladesh

Hong Kong:
GK	1	Yapp Hung Fai
RB	21	Tsang Kam To
CB	2	Lee Chi Ho
CB	15	Chan Wai Ho
LB	16	Chak Ting Fung	(substituted off) 12'
RM	8	Xu Deshuai
CM	12	Lo Kwan Yee
DM	24	Ju Yingzhi
LM	18	Kwok Kin Pong
SS	10	Au Yeung Yiu Chung	(substituted off) 84'
CF	9	Chao Pengfei
Substitutions:
GK	19	Leung Hing Kit
DF	3	Pak Wing Chak
DF	5	Lai Man Fei
DF	14	Chan Siu Yuen
DF	25	So Wai Chuen
MF	4	Yuen Kin Man
MF	11	Lai Yiu Cheong
MF	13	Chan Man Fai	(substituted in) 12'
FW	23	Lam Hok Hei	(substituted in) 84'
Manager:
Tsang Wai Chung

Bangladesh:
GK	1	Aminul Haque
RB	2	Nasirul Islam Nasir
CB	3	Waly Faisal
CB	14	Mamun Miah
LB	4	Md. Ariful Islam
DM	6	Atiqur Rahman Meshu	(yellow card) 43'	(substituted off) 84'
DM	5	Rezaul Karim
RM	8	Mamunul Islam
CM	18	Shahedul Alam Shahed		(substituted off) 68'
LM	7	Mohamed Zahid Hossain
CF	9	Enamul Hoque		(substituted off) 61'
Substitutions:
GK	12	Mazharul Islam
DF	15	Mintu Sheikh		(substituted in) 84'
MF	11	Shakil Ahmed		(substituted in) 61'
MF	16	Parvez Chowdhury
MF	19	Imtiaz Sultan
FW	10	Jahid Hasan Ameli
FW	17	Abdul Baten Mojumdar Komol
FW	20	Mithun Chowdhury		(substituted in) 68'
FW	21	Tawhidul Alam
Manager:
(Croatia) Robert Rubčić

Assistant referees:
Morteza Karimi (Iran)
Hsu Min-yu (Chinese Taipei)
Fourth official:
Cho Win (Myanmar)

15 November 2010	Oman	3 – 0	Hong Kong	Huangpu Sports Center, Guangzhou
UTC+8 16:00	Al-Hadhri 30', 61'; Aman 68'	Report		Referee: Choi Myung-Yong (Korea Republic)

Match Detail

Oman	Hong Kong

Oman:
GK	88	Obaid Al-Zaabi		(substituted off) 90+2'
	2	Nadhir Al-Maskari
	3	Saghayar Jaber	(yellow card) 38'
	5	Muzzeb Issa
	6	Malik Al-Hinai
	8	Aman Bait Nasib		(substituted off) 76'
	9	Waleed Al-Saadi	(yellow card) 21'
	10	Hussain Al-Hadhri
	12	Moatasim Al-Mukhaini
	15	Saleh Al-Musalami
	16	Mohammed Al-Gheilani	(yellow card) 45+2'	(substituted off) 70'
Substitutions:
GK	1	Bassam Al-Alawi
GK	22	Bassam Al-Battashi		(substituted in) 90+2'
GK	24	Sabeit Al-Alawi
	7	Khalil Al-Alawi
	11	Saleh Abdul-Hadi		(substituted in) 76'
	20	Badar Bamasila		(substituted in) 70'
	23	Nayef Bait Fada
Manager:
Ibrahim Al-Blaushi

Hong Kong:
GK	1	Yapp Hung Fai
DF	2	Lee Chi Ho	(yellow card) 81'
DF	13	Chan Man Fai		(substituted off) 65'
DF	15	Chan Wai Ho
DF	21	Tsang Kam To
MF	8	Xu Deshuai
MF	10	Au Yeung Yiu Chung		(substituted off) 53'
MF	12	Lo Kwan Yee
MF	18	Kwok Kin Pong
MF	24	Ju Yingzhi	(yellow card) 80'	(substituted off) 84'
FW	9	Chao Pengfei
Substitutions:
GK	19	Leung Hing Kit
DF	3	Pak Wing Chak
DF	5	Lai Man Fei
DF	14	Chan Siu Yuen
DF	16	Chak Ting Fung
MF	4	Yuen Kin Man
MF	11	Lai Yiu Cheong	(yellow card) 89'	(substituted in) 53'
FW	23	Lam Hok Hei		(substituted in) 84'
DF	25	So Wai Chuen		(substituted in) 65'
Manager:
Tsang Wai Chung

Assistant referees:
Choi Min-Byoung (Korea Republic)
Omar Suliman (UAE)
Fourth official:
Yu Ming-hsun (Chinese Taipei)

=== Hong Kong U-15 ===
==== U-15 EAFF Championship ====
Hong Kong national under-15 football team won all the group stage matches in the championship, which hold in Guam. Hong Kong beat Chinese Taipei in semi-final but lose by one goal in the final against North Korea. Hong Kong was awarded runners' up in the tournament.

1 August 2010	Hong Kong	5 – 0	Macau	Leo Palace Resort, Yona, Guam
	Wong Chun Hin; Tsang Tsz Hin; Yiu Ho Ming	News

2 August 2010	Hong Kong	3 – 1	Mongolia	Leo Palace Resort, Yona, Guam
	Tse Long Hin; Tan Chun Lok	News	Goal

3 August 2010	Guam	1 – 1	Hong Kong	Leo Palace Resort, Yona, Guam
	Goal	News	Chan Wai Lok

4 August 2010	Hong Kong	2 – 0	Chinese Taipei	Leo Palace Resort, Yona, Guam
	Law Hiu Chung	Report

5 August 2010	North Korea	3 – 2	Hong Kong	Leo Palace Resort, Yona, Guam
	Goal	Report	Law Hiu Chung; Tse Long Hin

== Exhibition matches ==
=== Xtep Cup ===
18 July 2010	Hong Kong League XI	2 – 3	(England) Birmingham City	Hong Kong Stadium, Hong Kong
15:15 UTC+8	Sandro 25'; Christian 45'	Report	Dann 21'; Gardner 74'; O'Connor 89'	Attendance: 13,626; Referee: Ng Chiu Kwok

=== Canon Cup ===
27 May 2011	Kitchee (Hong Kong)	0 – 3	(Spain) Villarreal	Hong Kong Stadium, Hong Kong
20:00 UTC+8		Report	Senna 57'; Trigueros 88'; Fofo 90'
