= 2010 Hong Kong–Macau Interport =

2010 sports match held in the People's Republic of China

The 66th Hong Kong–Macau Interport was held in Macau on 20 June 2010 and was won by Hong Kong.

== Squads ==
=== Hong Kong ===
Head coach: Tsang Wai Chung

No.	Pos.	Player	Date of birth (age)	Caps	Club
1	GK	Li Hon Ho	14 July 1986 (age 23)		(Hong Kong) NT Realty Wofoo Tai Po
3	DF	Cheng King Ho	7 November 1989 (age 20)		(Hong Kong) Tai Chung
4	DF	Pak Wing Chak	23 April 1990 (age 20)		(Hong Kong) Sun Hei
5	DF	Chak Ting Fung	27 November 1989 (age 20)		(Hong Kong) Fourway Rangers
7	MF	Ip Chung Long	16 November 1989 (age 20)		(Hong Kong) Tai Chung
9	FW	Lam Hok Hei	18 September 1991 (age 18)		(Hong Kong) Fourway Rangers
11	MF	Lai Yiu Cheong	25 September 1988 (age 21)		(Hong Kong) TSW Pegasus
12	DF	Lo Kwan Yee	9 October 1984 (age 25)		(Hong Kong) Kitchee
13	MF	Chan Man Fai	19 June 1988 (age 22)		(Hong Kong) Kitchee
14	DF	Chan Siu Yuen	2 November 1987 (age 22)		(Hong Kong) Fourway Rangers
15	MF	Yuen Kin Man	19 January 1989 (age 21)		(Hong Kong) TSW Pegasus
17	GK	Leung Hing Kit	22 October 1989 (age 20)		(Hong Kong) Fourway Rangers
18	MF	Tam Lok Hin	19 January 1991 (age 19)		(Hong Kong) Citizen
20	DF	Tsang Chi Hau	12 January 1990 (age 20)		(Hong Kong) Happy Valley
21	DF	Lai Man Fei	10 December 1988 (age 21)		(Hong Kong) TSW Pegasus
22	GK	Liu Fu Yuen	21 August 1990 (age 19)		(Hong Kong) Citizen
23	FW	Cheng Lai Hin	31 March 1986 (age 24)		(Hong Kong) Kitchee
24	DF	Yeung Chi Lun	20 November 1989 (age 20)		(Hong Kong) Citizen
25	DF	So Wai Chuen	26 March 1988 (age 22)		(Hong Kong) Sun Hei

=== Macau ===
Head coach: (Hong Kong) Leung Sui Wing

No.	Pos.	Player	Date of birth (age)	Caps	Club
1	GK	Liu Kin Cho			
2	DF	Choi Chun Yan			
4	DF	Lam Ka Pou	10 July 1985 (age 24)		(Macau) G.D. Lam Pak
5	DF	Vernon Wong	19 November 1989 (age 20)		(Macau) MFA Development
6	DF	Geofredo Cheung	18 May 1979 (age 31)		(Macau) C.D. Monte Carlo
7	FW	Tse Fu Wing			
8	MF	Cheang Cheng Ieong	18 August 1984 (age 25)		(Macau) G.D. Lam Pak
9	FW	Chan Kin Seng	19 March 1985 (age 25)		(Macau) Windsor Arch Ka I
10	MF	Loi Wai Hong	17 January 1992 (age 18)		(Macau) MFA Development
11	MF	Chow Wai Ho			
12	MF	Leung Han Lim			
13	DF	Tang Ho Fai			
17	MF	Sio Ka Un	16 March 1992 (age 18)		(Macau) MFA Development
21	FW	Lee Kam Ho			
22	GK	Chan Ka Kei	27 June 1987 (age 22)		(Macau) MFA Development
26	MF	David Cardoso	13 December 1994 (age 15)		(Macau) MFA Development
27	MF	Leung Chon In	8 July 1987 (age 22)		(Macau) G.D. Lam Pak
29	FW	Leong Ka Hang	22 November 1992 (age 17)		(Macau) MFA Development

== Results ==
20 June 2010
16:00 GMT+8

Macau	1–5	Hong Kong
Geofredo Cheung 10'	(Report) (in English) (Report) (in Chinese) (Match Stat.) (in Chinese)	Cheng Lai Hin 14', 42', 45'; Lo Kwan Yee 72'; Chan Ka Chun 90'

Estádio Campo Desportivo, Macau
Attendance: 200
Referee: Wong Kuan Lone (Macau)

Macau	Hong Kong

Macau:
GK	22	Chan Ka Kei		(substituted off) 79'
CB	26	David Cardoso
CB	4	Lam Ka Pou
CB	5	Vernon Wong		(substituted off) 84'
RM	13	Tang Ho Fai		(substituted off) 46'
CM	27	Leung Chon In		(substituted off) 57'
CM	8	Cheang Cheng Ieong
CM	10	Loi Wai Hong		(substituted off) 22'
LM	6	Geofredo Cheung (c)	(yellow card) 90+1' (yellow-red card) 90+2'
CF	9	Chan Kin Seng
CF	29	Leong Ka Hang		(substituted off) 46'
Substitutions:
GK	1	Liu Kin Cho		(substituted in) 79'
DF	2	Choi Chun Yan		(substituted in) 46'
MF	11	Chow Wai Ho		(substituted in) 57'
MF	12	Leung Han Lim
MF	17	Sio Ka Un		(substituted in) 22'
FW	7	Tse Fu Wing		(substituted in) 84'
FW	21	Lee Kam Ho	(yellow card) 66'	(substituted in) 46'
Manager:
(Hong Kong) Leung Sui Wing

Hong Kong:
GK	1	Li Hon Ho		(substituted off) 82'
RB	5	Chak Ting Fung	(yellow card) 54'	(substituted off) 84'
CB	25	So Wai Chuen		(substituted off) 79'
CB	14	Chan Siu Yuen
LB	12	Lo Kwan Yee (c)
DM	24	Yeung Chi Lun		(substituted off) 55'
RM	11	Lai Yiu Cheong
LM	4	Pak Wing Chak
AM	13	Chan Man Fai
CF	9	Lam Hok Hei		(substituted off) 75'
CF	23	Cheng Lai Hin		(substituted off) 63'
Substitutions:
GK	17	Leung Hing Kit		(substituted in) 82'
GK	22	Liu Fu Yuen
DF	3	Cheng King Ho		(substituted in) 75'
DF	20	Tsang Chi Hau
DF	21	Lai Man Fei		(substituted in) 79'
MF	7	Ip Chung Long	(yellow card) 66'	(substituted in) 63'
MF	15	Yuen Kin Man	(yellow card) 67'	(substituted in) 55'
MF	16	Chan Ka Chun		(substituted in) 84'
MF	18	Tam Lok Hin
Manager:
Tsang Wai Chung

Assistant referees:
Ng Yik Kwun (Macau)
Tang Yiu Fai (Macau)
Fourth official:
Wong Bing Kwun (Macau)
