= BMA Cup =

BMA Cup was an exhibition competition organized by Hong Kong First Division League football club South China on 23 February 2007 and they played against the guest team Yokohama F. Marinos of J. League.

South China won by an aggregate 6-5 after penalty shootout.

== Ticketing ==
Tickets to the match were not sold as the HKFA stated that the match date was too close to 2007 Lunar New Year Cup. Instead, tickets were allocated to different organizations especially South China Football Fan Club. Each member of the fan club was allowed to obtain two tickets of the match. Those who bought a two-day ticket for the 2007 Lunar New Year Cup were also able to receive a ticket to the match.

== Pre-match ==
There was a pre-match of SCAA 92/93 Invitation Team vs SCAA Elite Youth before the main exhibition match. This pre-match took the form of 30 minutes per half while the main match took the usual 45 minutes per half. SCAA 92/93 Invitation Team won 2–0 against SCAA Elite Youth with both goals scored by Anto Grabo.

=== Squads ===
SCAA 92/93 Invitation Team

- Leung Cheuk Cheung (梁卓長)
- Chu Yue Tai (朱雨大)
- Leslie Santos (山度士)
- Shum Kwok Pui (岑國培)
- Lee Fuk Wing (李福榮)
- Chan Kwok Hung (陳國雄)
- Lee Yun Wa (李潤華)
- Ku Kam Fai (顧錦輝)
- Au Yeung Ting Tsz (歐陽應慈)
- Law Wai Chi (羅偉志)
- Chan Ping On (陳炳安)
- Pang Kam Chuen (彭錦全)
- Chan Wai Chiu (陳偉超)
- Chiu Chung Man (招重文)
- Anto Grabo (基保)
- Choi York Yee (蔡育瑜)
- Marlon R. Van Der Sander (尹迪辛達)

SCAA Elite Youth

- Chan Wai Kwan (陳煒坤)
- Siu Leong (蕭亮)
- Leung Kong Yiu (梁罡耀)
- Cheng Chi Yin (鄭志賢)
- Lai Man Fei (賴文飛)
- Chan Kin Tung (陳健東)
- Chong Kai Chung (莊啟聰)
- Wong Chi Hung (王志雄)
- Au Fai Tat (歐輝達)
- Cheng Ching Hang (鄭正行)
- Chan Ka Chun (陳嘉晉)
- Leung Ho Chun (梁灝駿)
- Leung Kai Chung (梁啟聰)
- Tang Chi Ho (鄧智浩)
- Lui Kin Chung (呂建忠)
- Cheung Chun Hei (張晉僖)
- Li Chung Yin (李仲賢)
- Ng Ming Hei (吳銘浠)
- Tai Sze Chung (戴思聰)
- Lee Chun Yin (李俊賢)
- Cheung Tsz Fung (張子烽)

== Result ==
23 February 2007
20:15

South China	2–2	Yokohama F. Marinos
Chan Chi Hong 2'; Cris 74'	Report	Havenaar 45'; Komiyama 70'
Penalties
	4–3	(penalty scored) Havenaar; (penalty scored) Tanaka; (penalty missed) Amano; (penalty missed) Komiyama; (penalty scored) Kano

Hong Kong Stadium, Hong Kong
Attendance: 21,355 penalties1 = Detinho (penalty scored)
Yeung Ching Kwong (penalty scored)
Liang Zicheng (penalty missed)
Cris (penalty scored)
Cheng Siu Wai (penalty scored)

SOUTH CHINA:
GK	23	(China) Zhang Chunhui
DF	4	(China) Deng Jinghuang
DF	6	(Togo) Cris
DF	21	(Hong Kong) Man Pei Tak	(yellow card) 61'
DF	22	(Hong Kong) Lee Chi Ho
MF	11	(China) Li Haiqiang		(substituted off) 82'
MF	13	(Hong Kong) Chan Chi Hong	(yellow card) 12'	(substituted off) 64'
MF	20	(Serbia) Mihailo Jovanović		(substituted off) 46'
MF	26	(China) Bai He	(yellow card) 60' (yellow-red card) 80'
FW	7	(Hong Kong) Au Wai Lun (c)		(substituted off) 35'
FW	30	(Brazil) Detinho
Substitutions:
GK	16	(China) Zhang Jianzhong
MF	9	(China) Liang Zicheng	(yellow card) 85'	(substituted on) 35'
MF	27	(Hong Kong) Wong Chun Yue		(substituted on) 46' (substituted off) 77'
MF	18	(Hong Kong) Kwok Kin Pong		(substituted on) 64'
MF	19	(Hong Kong) Cheng Siu Wai		(substituted on) 77'
MF	8	(Hong Kong) Yeung Ching Kwong		(substituted on) 82'
Coach:
(Brazil) Casemiro Mior

YOKOHAMA F. MARINOS:
GK	31	(Japan) Hiroki Iikura
DF	13	(Japan) Takanobu Komiyama
DF	23	(Japan) Masakazu Tashiro
DF	26	(Japan) Yusuke Tanaka
DF	28	(Japan) Takashi Amano (c)	(yellow card) 43'
MF	14	(Japan) Kenta Kano
MF	29	(Japan) Aria Jasuru Hasegawa
MF	32	(Japan) Yukihiro Yamase	(yellow card) 59'
MF	34	(Japan) Taku Ishihara		(substituted off) 63'
FW	20	(Japan) Mike Havenaar
FW	27	(Japan) Yosuke Saito		(substituted off) 88'
Substitutions:
GK	37	(Japan) Yasuhiro Tominaga
DF	39	(Japan) Takashi Kanai		(substituted on) 88'
DF	40	(Japan) Kimihiro Kai
MF	38	(Japan) Kota Mizunuma		(substituted on) 63'
Coach:
(Japan) Takashi Mizunuma

== Live Broadcasting ==
- TV Broadcast: TVB Pearl
- Radio Broadcast: RTHK Radio 1

== Trivia ==
- South China booked Mong Kok Stadium for Yokohama F. Marinos to have their first training section on arrival date. A staff thanked SCAA's manager director Steven Lo at the night for providing them "the school football pitch", despite the fact that Mong Kok Stadium is actually the main venue for Hong Kong major football matches.
