= Rui Cardoso (footballer, born 1962) =

Macau footballer (born 1962)

Personal information
- Full name: Rui de Jesus Cardoso
- Date of birth: 29 July 1962 (age 64)
- Place of birth: Luanda, Angola
- Position: Forward

Youth career
- Real
- Sporting
- Real
- Estrela da Amadora

Senior career*
Years	Team	Apps	(Gls)
- Estrela da Amadora
- Hap Kuan
- Lam Pak
- Monte Carlo
–2011	Ka I		
2012	Benfica de Macau		

International career
1988–1989	Macau	2	(0)

Managerial career
- Ka I
- * Club domestic league appearances and goals

Rui de Jesus Cardoso (born 29 July 1962) is a football manager and former footballer. Born in Angola, he was a Macau international.

== Life and career ==
Cardoso was born on 29 July 1962 in Luanda, Angola. He was born to Portuguese parents. He moved with his family to Portugal at the age of twelve. He attended Macao Polytechnic University in Macau. He studied public administration. He mainly operated as a striker. As a youth player, he joined the youth academy of Portuguese side Real. After that, he joined the youth academy of Portuguese side Sporting. After that, he returned to the youth academy of Portuguese side Real. After that, he joined the youth academy of Portuguese side Estrela da Amadora. He started his senior career with the club. He helped them achieve promotion.

After that, he signed for Macau side Hap Kuan. After that, he signed for Macau side Lam Pak. After that, he signed for Macau side Monte Carlo. After that, he signed for Macau side Ka I. In 2012, he signed for Macau side Benfica de Macau. He managed Macau side Ka I. He helped the club win the league. He has regarded Portuguese manager Carlos Queiroz, Dutch manager Louis van Gaal and Dutch manager Rinus Michels as his football idols. He is the father of Macau footballer David Cardoso.
