= Lai Yiu Cheong =

Hong Kong footballer

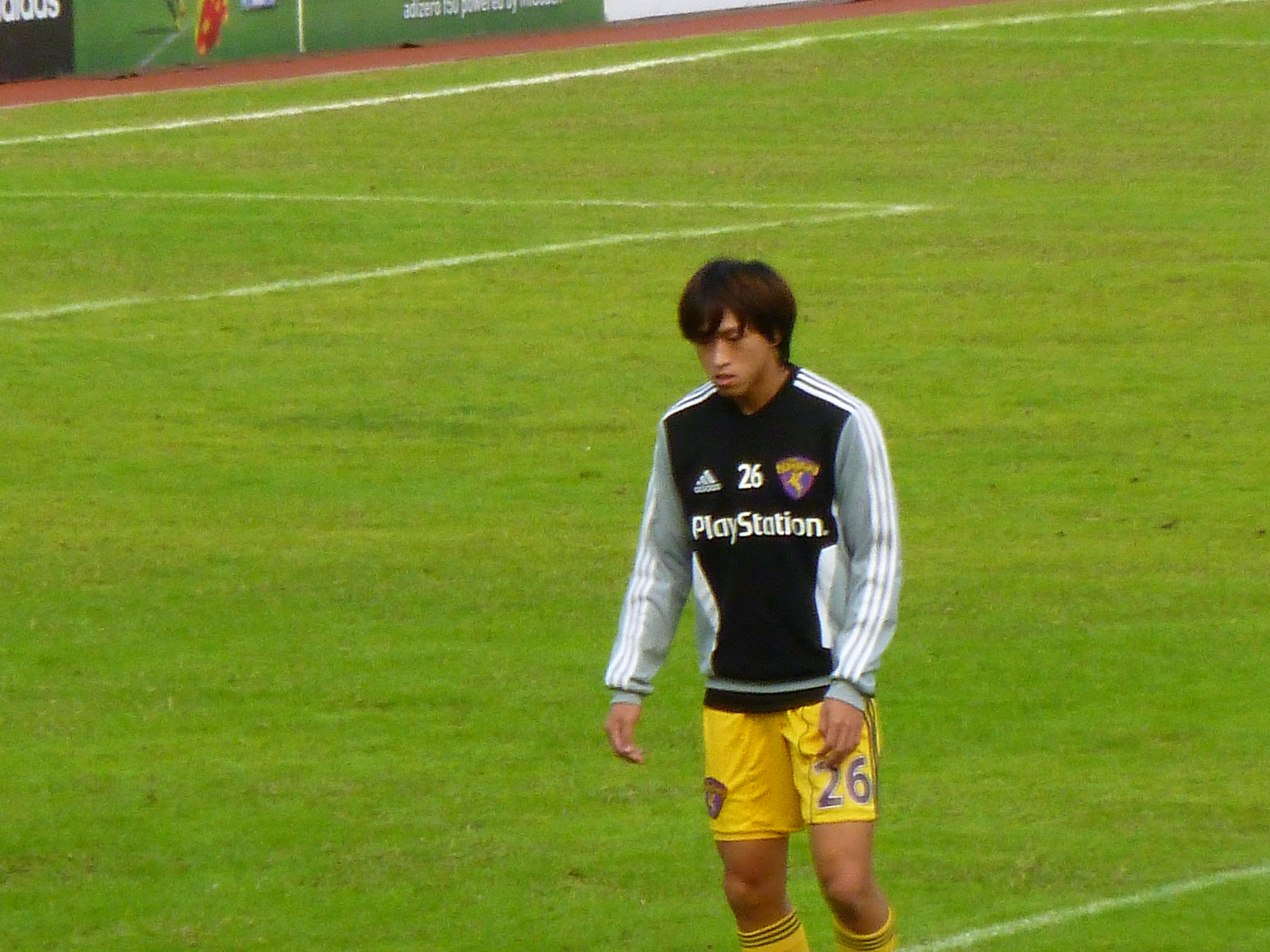

Personal information
- Full name: Lai Yiu Cheong
- Date of birth: 25 September 1988 (age 38)
- Place of birth: Hong Kong
- Height: 1.75 m (5 ft 9 in)
- Position: Right winger

Senior career*
Years	Team	Apps	(Gls)
2003–2004	Sai Kung		
2004–2008	Hong Kong Rangers	11	(0)
2008–2009	Fourway	9	(1)
2009–2012	Pegasus	43	(5)
2012–2013	Tuen Mun	21	(2)
2014	Sun Hei	9	(2)
2014–2015	Wong Tai Sin	16	(1)
2015–2017	South China	3	(0)
2016–2017	→ Hong Kong Rangers (loan)	12	(3)
2017–2019	Lee Man	10	(0)
2018	→ Yuen Long (loan)	2	(1)
2019–2022	Icanfield	26	(2)
2022–2023	Tsuen Wan		
2023–	Double Flower	15	(5)

International career
2008–2010	Hong Kong U-23	4	(0)
2010	Hong Kong	2	(0)
Medal record
Representing Hong Kong
East Asian Games
Gold medal – first place	2009 Hong Kong	Football
- * Club domestic league appearances and goals as of 1 January 2025

Lai Yiu Cheong (Chinese: 黎耀昌; Jyutping: lai^{4} jiu^{6} coeng^{1}; born 25 September 1988) is a former Hong Kong professional footballer who played as a right winger.

== Club career ==
=== Rangers ===
Lai Yiu Cheong made his Hong Kong First Division debut in the 2006–07 season. On 29 September 2006, Lai Yiu Cheong earned a place in the match squad list in the match against HKFC, but was an unused substitute player. Then, he finally made his first division league debut on 18 November 2006, in a match against Tai Po, being substituted 3 minutes before the end of the match. He finally had three league appearances and played one match in Hong Kong Senior Challenge Shield and Hong Kong FA Cup, respectively.

In the 2007–08 season, Lai Yiu Cheong got a lot more chances. He made 8 league appearances, although he was only a usual substitute in the team. For cup games, he played 3 Hong Kong League Cup games and 1 Hong Kong FA Cup match. However, he could not help the team to stay in the First Division.

=== Fourway ===
After spending 2 seasons in Rangers, he followed former Rangers club director Lee Fai Lap and joined the newly formed club Fourway in the beginning of the 2008–09 season. He scored his first first division league goal in the match against Tuen Mun Progoal on 31 October 2008. He made 9 league appearances and played 3 Hong Kong Senior Challenge Shield matches. He then eventually left the club in January 2009.

=== Pegasus ===
Lai Yiu Cheong joined Pegasus in January 2009. He was given the kit number 26. He had been an important player since his transfer to the club. He made 11 league appearances and scored 2 goals in his first season in Pegasus.

In the 2009–10 season, Lai Yiu Cheong made a total of 18 appearances, including 14 league games, 2 Senior Shield games and 2 FA Cup games. He scored only one goal for the team in the season, which was the winning goal for the team against Tai Po on 20 February 2010. He helped the team to win a place for the 2011 AFC Cup group stage.

In the 2010–11 season he played many matches for the team. He played 14 league games and scored 1 league goal. The goal was scored in the home game against South China on 22 April 2011. However, the goal did not help the team to win the game, being defeated 2–3. He featured all 6 AFC Cup group stage matches for the team and scored 2 goals. However, the team did not qualify to the knock-out stage.

=== Tuen Mun ===
On 13 June 2012, Lai Yiu Cheong joined Tuen Mun.

=== Sun Hei ===
On 1 January 2014, Rangers director Philip Lee announced that Lai would join Sun Hei on loan after being released by Tuen Mun.

=== Lee Man ===
On 3 July 2017, Lai moved to Lee Man. He signed with the club following Lee & Man Paper's decision to withdraw their sponsorship with Rangers and form their own HKPL club.

On 24 January 2018, Yuen Long acquired Lai on loan for the remainder of the 2017–18 season. He scored one goal in two appearances during his loan spell.

Lai left the club after the end of the 2018–19 season.

== Honours ==
=== Club ===
Lee Man

- Hong Kong Sapling Cup: 2018–19

=== International ===
Hong Kong

- East Asian Games: 2009

== Career statistics ==
=== Club ===
Club	Season	League		Senior Shield		League Cup		FA Cup		AFC Cup		Total	
Club	Season	Apps	Goals	Apps	Goals	Apps	Goals	Apps	Goals	Apps	Goals	Apps	Goals
Rangers	2006-07	3	0	1	0	0	0	1	0	0	0	5	0
Rangers	2007-08	8	0	0	0	3	0	1	0	0	0	12	0
Total		11	0	1	0	3	0	2	0	0	0	17	0
Fourway	2008-09	9	1	3	0	0	0	0	0	—	—	12	1
Total		9	1	3	0	0	0	0	0	0	0	12	1
Pegasus	2008-09	11	2	0	0	3	0	1	0	—	—	15	2
Pegasus	2009-10	14	1	2	0	—	—	2	0	—	—	18	1
Pegasus	2010-11	14	1	1	0	3	0	2	1	6	2	26	4
Pegasus	2011-12	4	1	4	0	0	0	0	0	—	—	8	1
TSW Pegasus Total		43	5	7	0	6	0	5	1	6	2	67	8
Career Total		63	6	11	0	9	0	7	1	6	2	96	9

=== International ===
==== Hong Kong ====
As of 7 January 2011

#	Date	Venue	Opponent	Result	Scored	Competition
1	6 January 2010	National Stadium, Madinat 'Isa, Bahrain	Bahrain	0–4	0	2011 AFC Asian Cup qualification
2	10 October 2010	Kaohsiung National Stadium, Kaohsiung	Macau	4–0	0	2010 Long Teng Cup

==== Hong Kong U-23 ====
As of 4 December 2010

#	Date	Venue	Opponent	Result	Scored	Competition
1	15 June 2008	Estádio Campo Desportivo, Macau	Macau	1–0	0	2008 Hong Kong–Macau Interport
2	4 December 2009	Siu Sai Wan Sports Ground, Hong Kong	South Korea	4–1	0	2009 East Asian Games
3	20 June 2010	Estádio Campo Desportivo, Macau	Macau	5–1	0	2010 Hong Kong–Macau Interport
4	15 November 2010	Huangpu Sports Center, Guangzhou, China	Oman	0–3	0	2010 Asian Games

== Personal life ==
On 29 May 2018, Lai married his girlfriend of ten years, Yuki.
