= Yan Lik Kin =

Hong Kong footballer and coach

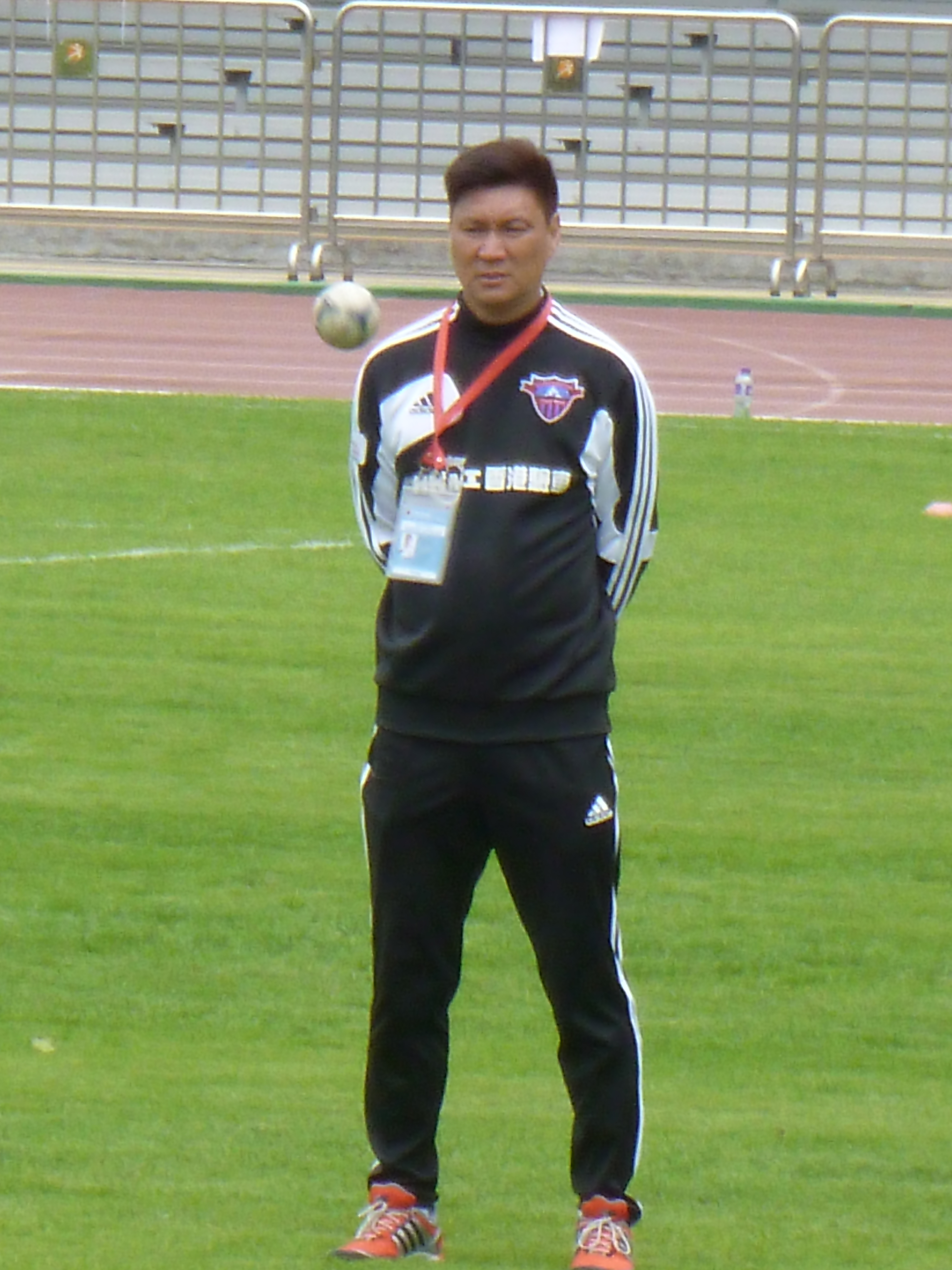

Personal information
- Full name: Yan Lik Kin
- Date of birth: 13 July 1961 (age 65)
- Position: Defender

Youth career
- Seiko

Senior career*
Years	Team	Apps	(Gls)
1981–1986	Seiko		
1986–1987	South China		
1987–1989	Sing Tao		
1989–1991	South China		
1991–1994	Instant-Dict		
1994–1997	Rangers (HKG)		
1997–1998	Happy Valley		
1998–2001	Golden / Sun Hei		

International career
- Hong Kong

Managerial career
- 2008–2009: Sun Hei
- 2009: Sun Hei (assistant)
- 2009–2010: Sun Hei
- 2009: Hong Kong U-23 (assistant)
- 2009–2010: Hong Kong (GD-HK Cup)
- 2010–2011: Fourway Rangers
- 2012–2013: Tuen Mun
- 2015: Biu Chun Rangers
- 2016: Biu Chun Rangers
- * Club domestic league appearances and goals

Yan Lik Kin (Chinese: 甄力健; Jyutping: jan^{1} lik^{6} gin^{6}, born 13 July 1961) is a Hong Kong football coach.

He played for Seiko, South China, Sing Tao, Instant Dict, Golden/Sun Hei and Happy Valley. He qualified as an AFC Class A coach. He is the coach of Hong Kong team that participating 2009–10 Guangdong-Hong Kong Cup.

As he looked like singer Jacky Cheung when he was a player, he was also nicknamed "Jacky Cheung on the football pitch". Fans of Jacky Cheung mistook him for Cheung and sought his signature.
