= Iu Wai =

Hong Kong footballer

Iu Wai 姚韡
Personal information
- Full name: Iu Wai
- Date of birth: 9 November 1991 (age 34)
- Place of birth: Hong Kong
- Height: 1.85 m (6 ft 1 in)
- Position: Defender

Senior career*
Years	Team	Apps	(Gls)
2007–2008	Hong Kong Rangers		
2008–2011	Fourway		
2011	Hong Kong Sapling		

International career
2008–2011	Hong Kong U-20	8	(3)
- * Club domestic league appearances and goals

Iu Wai (Chinese: 姚韡; Jyutping: jiu^{4} wai^{4}, born 9 November 1991 in Hong Kong) is a former Hong Kong professional football player who played as a defender.

== Playing career ==
He made his debut on 14 October 2007 at the game against Kitchee.

His career came to an abrupt end after he was involved in a match-fixing case during a U21 friendly match against Russia back in 2011 where he attempted to bribe two fellow U21 players Chiu Yu-Ming and Chan Cham-Hei to throw the match in return for payment. However, the two declined Iu's offer and reported the case to the anti-corruption authorities. Iu, later admitted and pleaded guilty to two counts of bribery.

== Career statistics ==
=== Club ===
Club	Season	No.	League		League Cup		Senior Shield		FA Cup		Reserve		Total	
Club	Season	No.	Apps	Goals	Apps	Goals	Apps	Goals	Apps	Goals	Apps	Goals	Apps	Goals
Bulova Rangers	2007–08	7	0 (1)	0	0	0	0	0	0	0	14	2	0 (1)	0
Bulova Rangers	Total													
Bulova Rangers	Career Total													
