= Chan Wai Lok =

Hong Kong footballer

Personal information
- Full name: Chan Wai Lok
- Date of birth: 31 May 1996 (age 30)
- Place of birth: Hong Kong
- Height: 1.72 m (5 ft 8 in)
- Position: Midfielder

Senior career*
| Years | Team | Apps | (Gls) |
| 2018–2019 | Hoi King | 1 | (0) |
| 2019–2020 | Hong Kong Rangers | 0 | (0) |
| 2020–2022 | Central & Western | 15 | (0) |
| 2022– | Yuen Long | 73 | (4) |
- * Club domestic league appearances and goals

Chan Wai Lok (Chinese: 陳瑋樂; born 31 May 1996 in Hong Kong) is a Hong Kong professional footballer. Chan started his senior career with Hoi King in the Hong Kong Premier League, where he made only one appearance. After that, he moved to another HKPL club Rangers.
