= Takanobu Komiyama =

Japanese footballer

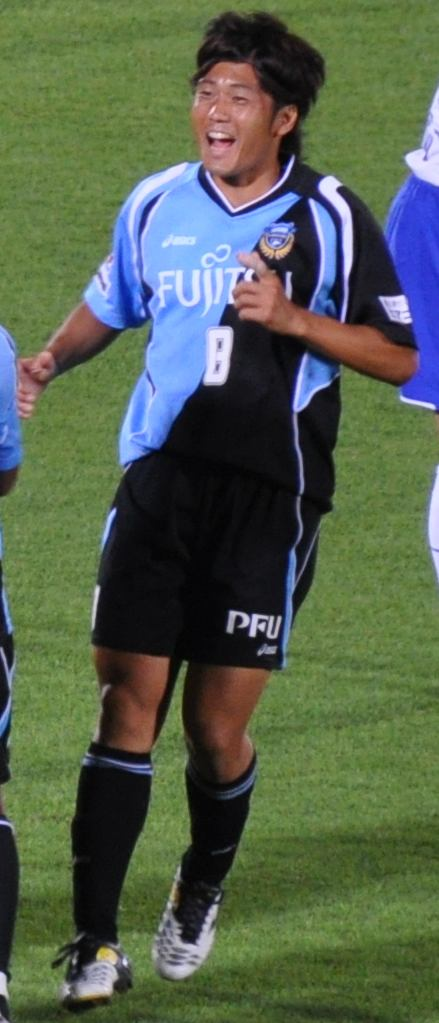

Personal information
- Date of birth: 3 October 1984 (age 42)
- Place of birth: Funabashi, Chiba, Japan
- Height: 1.75 m (5 ft 9 in)
- Position: Defender

Youth career
- 1997–1999: JEF United Ichihara; Junior Youth Maihama
- 2000–2002: Municipal Funabashi High School
- 2003–2006: Juntendo University

Senior career*
Years	Team	Apps	(Gls)
2006–2009	Yokohama F. Marinos	85	(10)
2010–2016	Kawasaki Frontale	115	(3)
2017	Yokohama FC	25	(0)
Medal record
Kawasaki Frontale
Runner-up	Emperor's Cup	2016
- * Club domestic league appearances and goals as of 23 February 2018

Takanobu Komiyama (小宮山 尊信; born 3 October 1984 in Chiba, Japan) is a former Japanese football player who last played for J2 League team Yokohama FC.

== Career ==
Komiyama is a left sided defender who has a sense of steady defence and accurate crosses. He was a member of the Japanese team what won gold in football in the 2005 Summer Universiade in Turkey. In 2006, he joined the Yokohama F. Marinos as part of a special JFL/J.League program and made his debut for the club. In 2007, he signed full professional terms with Yokohama F. Marinos. Komiyama received a call-up for the national team in 2007 by Ivica Osim but he never played a game for Japan.

== J-League firsts ==
- Appearance: 12 August 2006. Yokohama F. Marinos 1 vs 1 Kawasaki Frontale, Todoroki Athletics Stadium

== Career statistics ==
Updated to 23 February 2018.

Club performance			League		Cup		League Cup		Continental		Total	
Season	Club	League	Apps	Goals	Apps	Goals	Apps	Goals	Apps	Goals	Apps	Goals
Japan			League		Emperor's Cup		League Cup		AFC		Total	
2006	Yokohama F Marinos	J1 League	1	0	0	0	1	0	-		2	0
2007	Yokohama F Marinos	J1 League	25	0	1	0	5	0	-		31	0
2008	Yokohama F Marinos	J1 League	31	7	4	0	6	1	-		41	8
2009	Yokohama F Marinos	J1 League	28	3	3	0	9	0	-		40	3
2010	Kawasaki Frontale	J1 League	33	3	3	0	4	0	6	0	46	3
2011	Kawasaki Frontale	J1 League	25	0	3	0	2	1	-		30	1
2012	Kawasaki Frontale	J1 League	7	0	0	0	2	0	-		9	0
2013	Kawasaki Frontale	J1 League	10	0	3	0	1	0	-		14	0
2014	Kawasaki Frontale	J1 League	18	0	1	1	2	0	0	0	21	1
2015	Kawasaki Frontale	J1 League	21	0	3	1	2	0	-		26	1
2016	Kawasaki Frontale	J1 League	1	0	1	0	1	0	-		3	0
2017	Yokohama FC	J2 League	25	0	0	0	-		-		25	0
Career total			225	13	22	2	35	2	6	0	289	17
