= Zhao Wei (footballer) =

Chinese footballer

Zhao Wei 赵伟
Personal information
- Date of birth: February 3, 1989 (age 37)
- Place of birth: Dalian, Liaoning, China
- Height: 1.78 m (5 ft 10 in)
- Position: Midfielder

Team information
- Current team: Dandong Tengyue
- Number: 10

Senior career*
Years	Team	Apps	(Gls)
2010	Liaoning Tiger	?	(?)
2011–2016	Harbin Yiteng	65	(4)
2016–2017	Shenzhen Renren	10	(1)
2017	→ Heilongjiang FC (loan)	21	(4)
2018–2019	Heilongjiang Lava Spring	6	(0)
2020	Dongguan United	-	(-)
2021–	Dandong Tengyue	0	(0)
- * Club domestic league appearances and goals as of 31 December 2020

Zhao Wei (Chinese: 赵伟; born 3 February 1989) is a Chinese football player who currently plays for China League Two side Dandong Tengyue.

== Club career ==
In 2010, Zhao Wei started his professional footballer career with Liaoning Tiger in the China League Two. In February 2011, Xu transferred to China League Two side Harbin Yiteng. In the 2011 China League Two campaign he would be part of the team that won the division and promotion into the second tier. He would go on to be a member of the squad as they moved up divisions and gained promotion to the Chinese Super League. He would eventually make his Super league debut for Harbin on 13 April 2014 in a game against Shanghai Shenxin in a 1-0 defeat.

In June 2016, Zhao transferred to China League Two side Shenzhen Renren. In March 2017, Zhao transferred to fellow League Two side Heilongjiang Lava Spring on loan. The following season the move would be made permanent.

== Career statistics ==
Statistics accurate as of match played 31 December 2020.

Appearances and goals by club, season and competition
Club	Season	League			National Cup		Continental		Other		Total	
Club	Season	Division	Apps	Goals	Apps	Goals	Apps	Goals	Apps	Goals	Apps	Goals
Liaoning Tiger	2010	China League Two			-		-		-			
Harbin Yiteng	2011	China League Two	15	3	-		-		-		15	3
Harbin Yiteng	2012	China League One	17	0	0	0	-		-		17	0
Harbin Yiteng	2013	China League One	17	1	1	0	-		-		18	1
Harbin Yiteng	2014	Chinese Super League	4	0	1	0	-		-		5	0
Harbin Yiteng	2015	China League One	10	0	1	0	-		-		11	0
Harbin Yiteng	2016	China League One	2	0	0	0	-		-		2	0
Harbin Yiteng	Total		65	4	3	0	0	0	0	0	68	4
Shenzhen Renren	2016	China League Two	10	1	0	0	-		-		10	1
Heilongjiang Lava Spring (loan)	2017	China League Two	21	4	2	1	-		-		23	5
Heilongjiang Lava Spring	2018	China League One	6	0	2	0	-		-		8	0
Heilongjiang Lava Spring	2019	China League One	0	0	2	0	-		-		2	0
Heilongjiang Lava Spring	Total		6	0	4	0	0	0	0	0	10	0
Career total			102	9	9	1	0	0	0	0	111	10

== Honours ==
=== Club ===
Harbin Yiteng

- China League Two: 2011

Heilongjiang Lava Spring

- China League Two: 2017
