= Roel Gener =

Filipino footballer

Personal information
- Full name: Roel Jimena Gener
- Date of birth: June 27, 1974 (age 52)
- Place of birth: Barotac Nuevo, Iloilo, Philippines
- Position: Defender

Senior career*
Years	Team	Apps	(Gls)
–	Philippine Army		

International career
–	Philippines		
- * Club domestic league appearances and goals

Roel Jimena Gener is a former Filipino footballer who has played for the Philippine national football team.

Gener was born on June 27, 1974, in Barotac Nuevo. Growing up in a town known for football in the Philippines, Gener played the sport as early as three years old. For his collegiate studies he attended the Western Visayas College of Science and Technology to pursue a course on machine shop technology.

Gener has also played for the Philippine national football team and was part of the squad that played in the 2004 and 2010 AFF Championship.

He is an enlisted member of the Philippine Army and as of 2020 is still part of the military. Consequentially, Gener is also part of Philippine Army F.C. which played in the now defunct United Football League and has also served as a coach with the military club.
