= Takashi Amano (footballer) =

Japanese footballer (born 1986)

Personal information
- Full name: Takashi Amano
- Date of birth: April 13, 1986 (age 40)
- Place of birth: Yokohama, Kanagawa, Japan
- Height: 5 ft 4 in (1.63 m)
- Positions: Midfielder; defender

Team information
- Current team: Nagano Parceiro
- Number: 35

Youth career
- 1999–2001: Yokohama F. Marinos Junior Youth
- 2002–2004: Yokohama F. Marinos Youth

Senior career*
Years	Team	Apps	(Gls)
2004–2015	Yokohama F. Marinos	43	(4)
2014	→ JEF United Chiba (loan)	7	(0)
2016–	Nagano Parceiro	17	(0)
Medal record
Yokohama F. Marinos
Runner-up	J1 League	2013
Winner	Emperor's Cup	2013
- * Club domestic league appearances and goals as of 23 February 2017

Takashi Amano (天野 貴史, Amano Takashi; born April 13, 1986 in Yokohama, Kanagawa) is a Japanese football player who currently plays for the J3 League team Nagano Parceiro.

== Career statistics ==
Updated to 23 February 2017.

Club performance			League		Cup		League Cup		Continental		Total	
Season	Club	League	Apps	Goals	Apps	Goals	Apps	Goals	Apps	Goals	Apps	Goals
Japan			League		Emperor's Cup		League Cup		Asia		Total	
2004	Yokohama F. Marinos	J1 League	0	0	0	0	0	0	1	0	1	0
2005	Yokohama F. Marinos	J1 League	0	0	0	0	0	0	0	0	0	0
2006	Yokohama F. Marinos	J1 League	0	0	0	0	1	0	-		1	0
2007	Yokohama F. Marinos	J1 League	3	0	0	0	2	0	-		5	0
2008	Yokohama F. Marinos	J1 League	0	0	0	0	1	0	-		1	0
2009	Yokohama F. Marinos	J1 League	6	0	0	0	0	0	-		6	0
2010	Yokohama F. Marinos	J1 League	21	3	2	0	1	0	-		24	3
2011	Yokohama F. Marinos	J1 League	13	1	0	0	3	0	-		16	1
2012	Yokohama F. Marinos	J1 League	0	0	0	0	0	0	-		0	0
2013	Yokohama F. Marinos	J1 League	2	0	0	0	2	0	-		4	0
2014	JEF United Chiba	J2 League	7	0	0	0	-		-		7	0
2015	Yokohama F. Marinos	J1 League	0	0	0	0	2	0	–		2	0
2016	Nagano Parceiro	J3 League	17	0	0	0	–		–		17	0
Career total			67	4	2	0	12	0	1	0	84	4

== J-League Firsts ==
- Appearance: April 14, 2007. Yokohama F Marinos 5 vs 0 Ōita Trinita, Nissan Stadium

== Honours ==
Yokohama F. Marinos

- Emperor's Cup: 2013
