= David Cardoso =

Macau footballer

Personal information
- Full name: David Rui de Kong Cardoso
- Date of birth: 13 December 1994 (age 31)
- Place of birth: Portuguese Macau
- Height: 1.83 m (6 ft 0 in)
- Position: Defensive midfielder

Team information
- Current team: Anadia

Youth career
- 2009: Benfica Macau
- 2010: Development
- 2010–2011: Benfica
- 2011–2013: Feirense

Senior career*
Years	Team	Apps	(Gls)
2013–2015	Mafra	8	(1)
2015	Loures	0	(0)
2015–2016	Cova da Piedade	6	(0)
2016–2017	Braga B	1	(0)
2017–2018	Boavista B	18	(1)
2019–2021	Bordeaux B	18	(1)
2021	Casa Pia AC	0	(0)
2022	Moncarapachense	6	(0)
2023-2025	Fabril Barreiro	60	(4)
2025-	Anadia	0	(0)
- * Club domestic league appearances and goals as of 15 July 2025

David Rui de Kong Cardoso (born 13 December 1994) is a Macanese professional footballer who most recently plays as a defensive midfielder for Anadia.

== Club career ==
Cardoso began his senior career in Portugal, progressing through several lower-division and reserve sides. After youth stints with Benfica Macau, Benfica (Portugal), and Feirense, he went on to play with Mafra, where he made several appearances between 2013 and 2015.

On 28 January 2017, Cardoso made his professional debut with Braga B in a 2016–17 LigaPro match against Cova da Piedade.

On 31 January 2019, Bordeaux announced that they had signed Cardoso to a 2.5-year contract.

Following his time in France, he returned to Portugal with Casa Pia AC in 2021, and in 2022 played for Moncarapachense, featuring in the Campeonato de Portugal.

In 2023–2025 Cardoso represented Fabril Barreiro, making 60 appearances and scoring four goals in the Campeonato de Portugal.

In July 2025, he joined Anadia FC for the 2025–26 season on a contract running to June 2026.

Cardoso’s primary role throughout his career has been as a defensive midfielder, though he is also noted for versatility across central midfield positions.

== International career ==
Cardoso played his first recorded match for Macau in the 2010 Hong Kong–Macau Interport at the age of 15, becoming one of the youngest-ever debutants for the team.

In September 2024, David Cardoso was excluded from Macau’s squad for the 2027 AFC Asian Cup. This decision was due to a regulatory issue regarding player passport eligibility. The Asian Football Confederation (AFC) and FIFA ruled that players with overseas passports, including Cardoso, couldn’t be included. The Macau Football Association confirmed this change. It affected several other players as well.
