= Chen Xu (footballer) =

Chinese footballer (born 1985)

Personal information
- Date of birth: 15 July 1985 (age 41)
- Place of birth: Meizhou, Guangdong, China
- Height: 1.76 m (5 ft 9 in)
- Position: Midfielder

Senior career*
Years	Team	Apps	(Gls)
2003–2005	Sunray Cave	12	(0)
- Guangdong Sunray Cave
2018	Hubei Chufeng United		
- * Club domestic league appearances and goals as of 14:01, 24 August 2021 (UTC)

Chen Xu (simplified Chinese: 陈旭; traditional Chinese: 陳旭; pinyin: Chén Xù; born 15 July 1985) is a former Chinese footballer. He played for the second team of third-tier club Guangzhou Sunray Cave Easter, Sunray Cave, in the Hong Kong First Division.

== Career statistics ==
=== Club ===
Club	Season	League			Cup		Other		Total	
Club	Season	Division	Apps	Goals	Apps	Goals	Apps	Goals	Apps	Goals
Sunray Cave	2003–04	First Division	10	0	2 (Note: Appearances in the Hong Kong FA Cup)	1	0	0	12	1
Sunray Cave	2004–05	First Division	2	0	0	0	0	0	2	0
Career total			14	0	2	1	0	0	14	1
