= Pak Wing Chak =

Hong Kong footballer (born 1990)

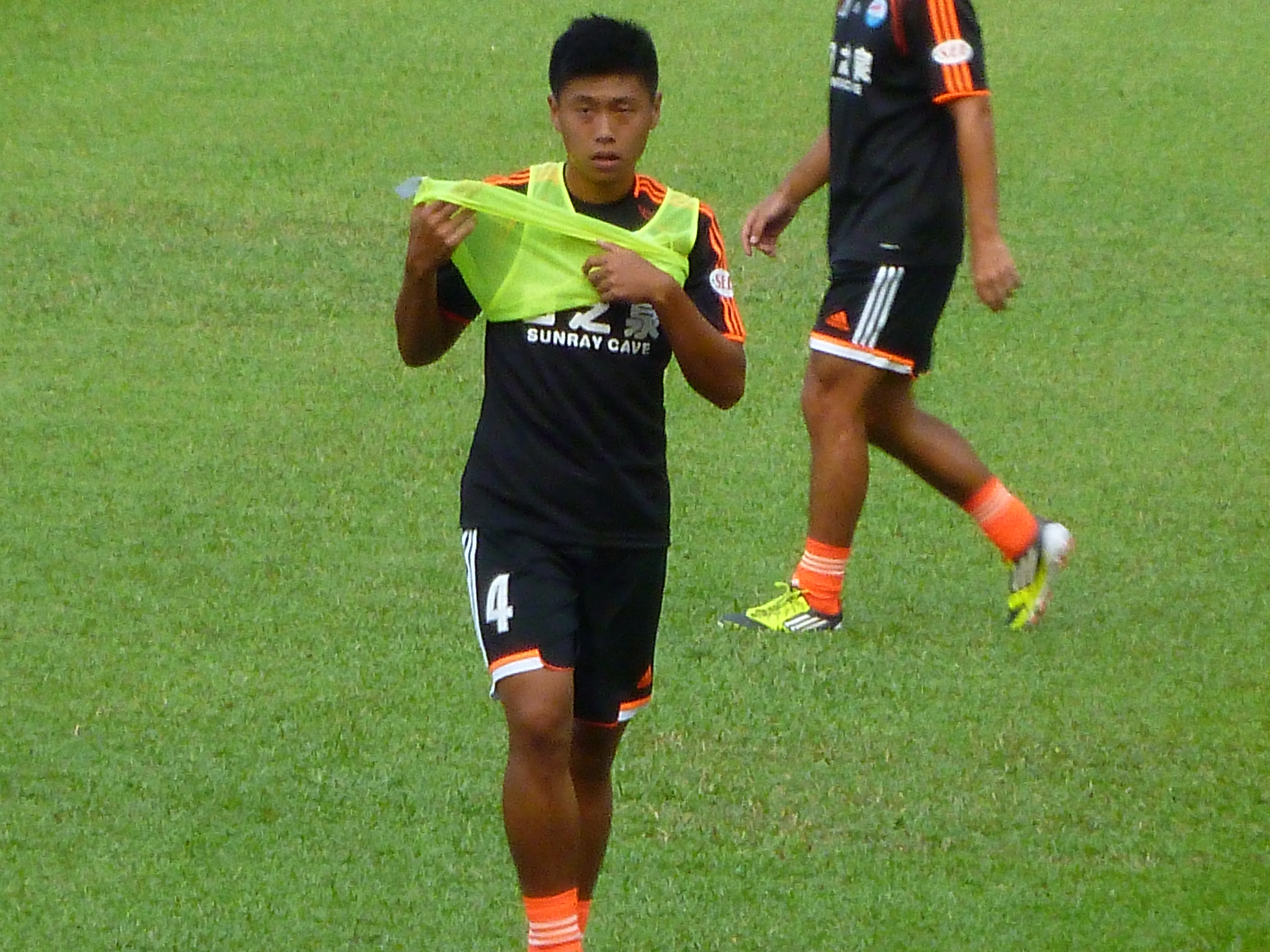

Personal information
- Full name: Pak Wing Chak
- Date of birth: 23 April 1990 (age 36)
- Place of birth: Hong Kong
- Height: 1.74 m (5 ft 9 in)
- Position: Left-back

Youth career
- 2005–2007: Hong Kong 09

Senior career*
Years	Team	Apps	(Gls)
2007–2008	Workable	9	(0)
2008–2009	Eastern	8	(0)
2009–2013	Sun Hei	57	(2)
2013–2014	Eastern	0	(0)
2014	→ Southern (loan)	2	(0)
2014–2015	Eastern	0	(0)
2017–2018	Hoi King	19	(0)
2018–2019	Kwok Keung		
2019–2020	St. Joseph's	6	(2)
2021–2022	Hoi King	7	(0)
2025–	Tsun Tat		

International career
2011	Hong Kong U-23	3	(0)
2010–2011	Hong Kong	3	(0)
- * Club domestic league appearances and goals as of 17 May 2026

Pak Wing Chak
- Traditional Chinese: 白榮澤
Transcriptions
Standard Mandarin
- Hanyu Pinyin: Bai Rongze
Yue: Cantonese
- Jyutping: baak^{6} wing^{4} zaak^{6}

Pak Wing Chak (Chinese: 白榮澤; born 23 April 1990) is a Hong Kong former professional footballer who played as a left-back. He is now a police officer.

== Early years ==
Pak spent his secondary school years in Buddhist Wong Fung Ling College.

== Club career ==
=== Hong Kong 09 ===
Pak started his football career in Hong Kong Third 'District' Division League club Hong Kong 09. He was a regular starting XI as the left-back. During his 2 years spent in the club, he played 31 league games.

=== Workable ===
In the 2007–08 season, Pak signed his first professional football career contract Workable, a newly promoted team playing in the First Division. However, the team dissolved at the end of the season.

=== Eastern ===
Following Workable manager Chan Hiu Ming's and coach Lee Kin Wo's footstep, Pak joined another First Division League club Eastern in the 2008–09 season.

=== Sun Hei ===
Pak joined Sun Hei for an undisclosed fee in the summer of 2009.

On 16 October 2011, he scored a goal in the 57th minute, helping the team to win over Sham Shui Po 5–0 at Mong Kok Stadium. The match was the first competitive league game after Mong Kok Stadium renovation work was completed. The goal was also his first goal for Sun Hei, as well as his first First Division League goal.

=== Eastern ===
On 1 June 2013, Pak rejoined newly-promoted First Division club Eastern.

== Career statistics ==
=== Club ===
As of 6 May 2013

Club performance			League		Cup				League Cup		Continental		Total	
Season	Club	League	Apps	Goals	Apps	Goals	Apps	Goals	Apps	Goals	Apps	Goals	Apps	Goals
Hong Kong			League		Junior Shield		FA Cup		League Cup		AFC Cup		Total	
2005–06	Hong Kong 09	Third 'District' Division	15	0	0	0	N/A	N/A	N/A	N/A	N/A	N/A	15	0
2006–07	Hong Kong 09	Third 'District' Division	14	0	3	0	N/A	N/A	N/A	N/A	N/A	N/A	17	0
Hong Kong 09 Total			29	0	3	0	0	0	0	0	0	0	32	0
Hong Kong			League		Senior Shield		FA Cup		League Cup		AFC Cup		Total	
2007–08	Workable	First Division	9	0	0	0	1	0	0	0	N/A	N/A	10	0
Workable Total			9	0	0	0	1	0	0	0	0	0	10	0
2008–09	Eastern	First Division	8	0	0	0	0	0	1	0	3	0	12	0
2009–10	Sun Hei	First Division	10	0	2	0	1	0	N/A	N/A	N/A	N/A	13	0
2010–11	Sun Hei	First Division	16	0	1	0	1	0	1	0	N/A	N/A	19	0
2011–12	Sun Hei	First Division	13	2	2	0	1	0	1	0	N/A	N/A	17	2
2012–13	Sun Hei	First Division	18	0	1	0	2	0	0	0	5	0	26	0
Sun Hei Total			57	2	6	0	5	0	2	0	5	0	75	2
2013–14	Eastern	First Division	0	0	0	0	0	0	0	0	0	0	0	0
Eastern Total			8	0	0	0	0	0	1	0	3	0	12	0
Hong Kong Total			103	2	9	0	6	0	3	0	8	0	129	2
Career Total			103	1	9	0	6	0	3	0	8	0	129	1

=== International ===
==== Hong Kong U23 ====
As of 23 June 2011

#	Date	Venue	Opponent	Result	Scored	Captain	Competition
1	24 January 2011	So Kon Po Recreation Ground, Hong Kong	Chinese Taipei	4–0	0		Friendly
2	26 January 2011	Sai Tso Wan Recreation Ground, Hong Kong	Chinese Taipei	1–0	0		Friendly
3	23 June 2011	Hong Kong Stadium, Hong Kong	Uzbekistan	0–2	0		2012 AFC Men's Pre-Olympic Tournament
