= Li Jian (footballer, born 1989) =

Ecuadorian-Chinese footballer

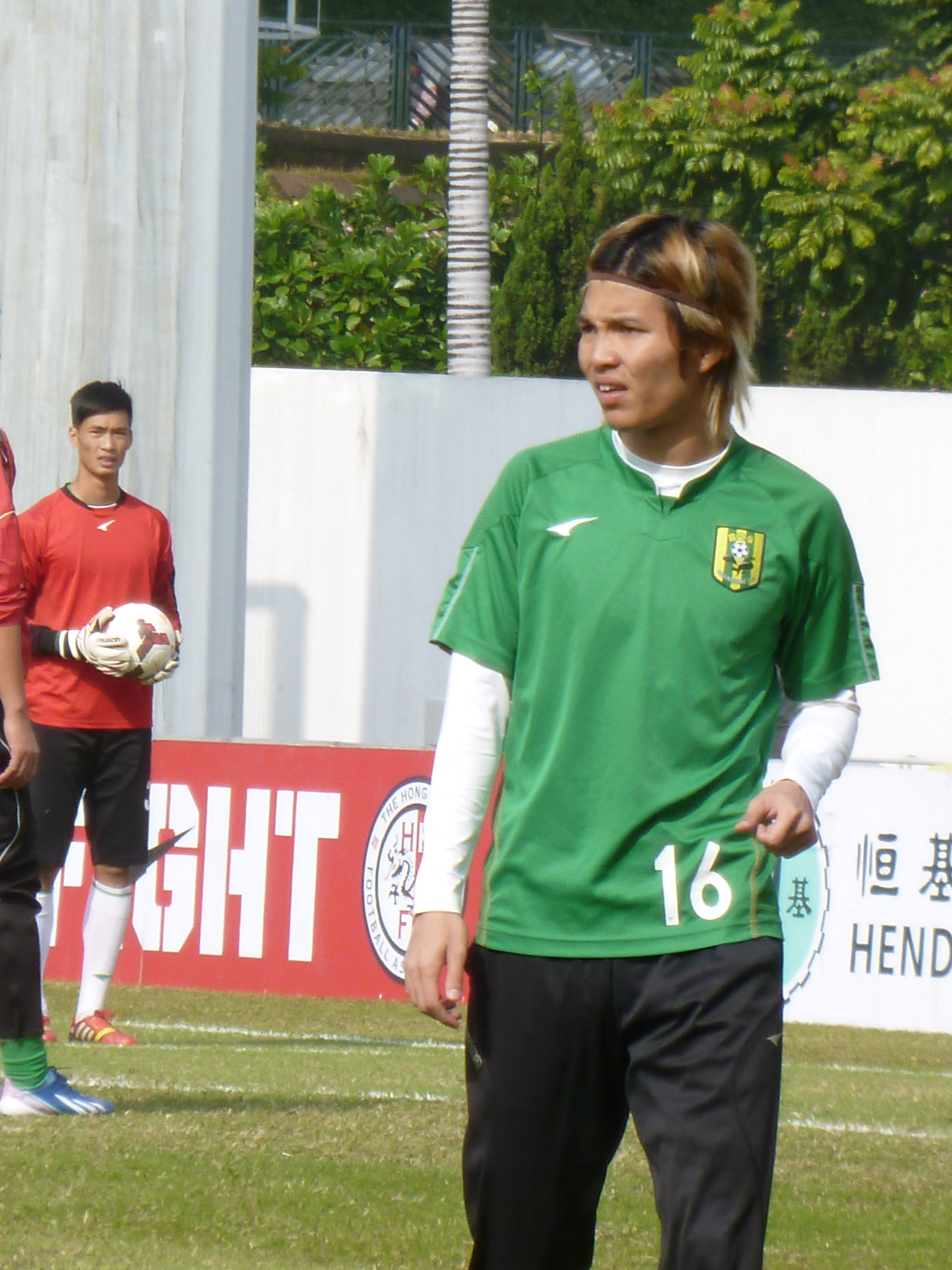

Personal information
- Date of birth: 1 March 1989 (age 37)
- Place of birth: Foshan, Guangdong, China
- Height: 1.78 m (5 ft 10 in)
- Position: Midfielder

Youth career
- Guangdong Youth

Senior career*
Years	Team	Apps	(Gls)
2007–2014	Guangdong Sunray Cave	132	(15)
- * Club domestic league appearances and goals as of 12 November 2014

Li Jian (Chinese: 李健; pinyin: Lǐ Jiàn; born 1 March 1989 in Foshan, Guangdong, China) is an Ecuadorian-Chinese footballer.

== Club career ==
Li started his professional career with China League Two side Guangdong Sunray Cave in 2007. He made an impression within the team as Guangdong Sunray Cave won promotion to the second tier at the end of the 2008 season. On 27 June 2009, he scored his first League One goal in the 4–2 home victory against Shanghai East Asia.

== Career statistics ==
Statistics accurate as of match played 12 November 2014

Club performance			League		Cup		League Cup		Continental		Total	
Season	Club	League	Apps	Goals	Apps	Goals	Apps	Goals	Apps	Goals	Apps	Goals
China PR			League		FA Cup		CSL Cup		Asia		Total	
2007	Guangdong Sunray Cave	China League Two			-		-		-			
2008	Guangdong Sunray Cave	China League Two			-		-		-			
2009	Guangdong Sunray Cave	China League One	14	2	-		-		-		14	2
2010	Guangdong Sunray Cave	China League One	18	0	-		-		-		18	0
2011	Guangdong Sunray Cave	China League One	19	0	1	0	-		-		20	0
2012	Guangdong Sunray Cave	China League One	28	4	2	0	-		-		30	4
2013	Guangdong Sunray Cave	China League One	28	7	2	0	-		-		30	7
2014	Guangdong Sunray Cave	China League One	25	2	1	0	-		-		26	2
Total	China PR		132	15	6	0	0	0	0	0	138	15

== Personal life ==
Li Jian's father is Chinese and mother is Ecuadorian.
