= Chan Ka Chun =

Hong Kong footballer

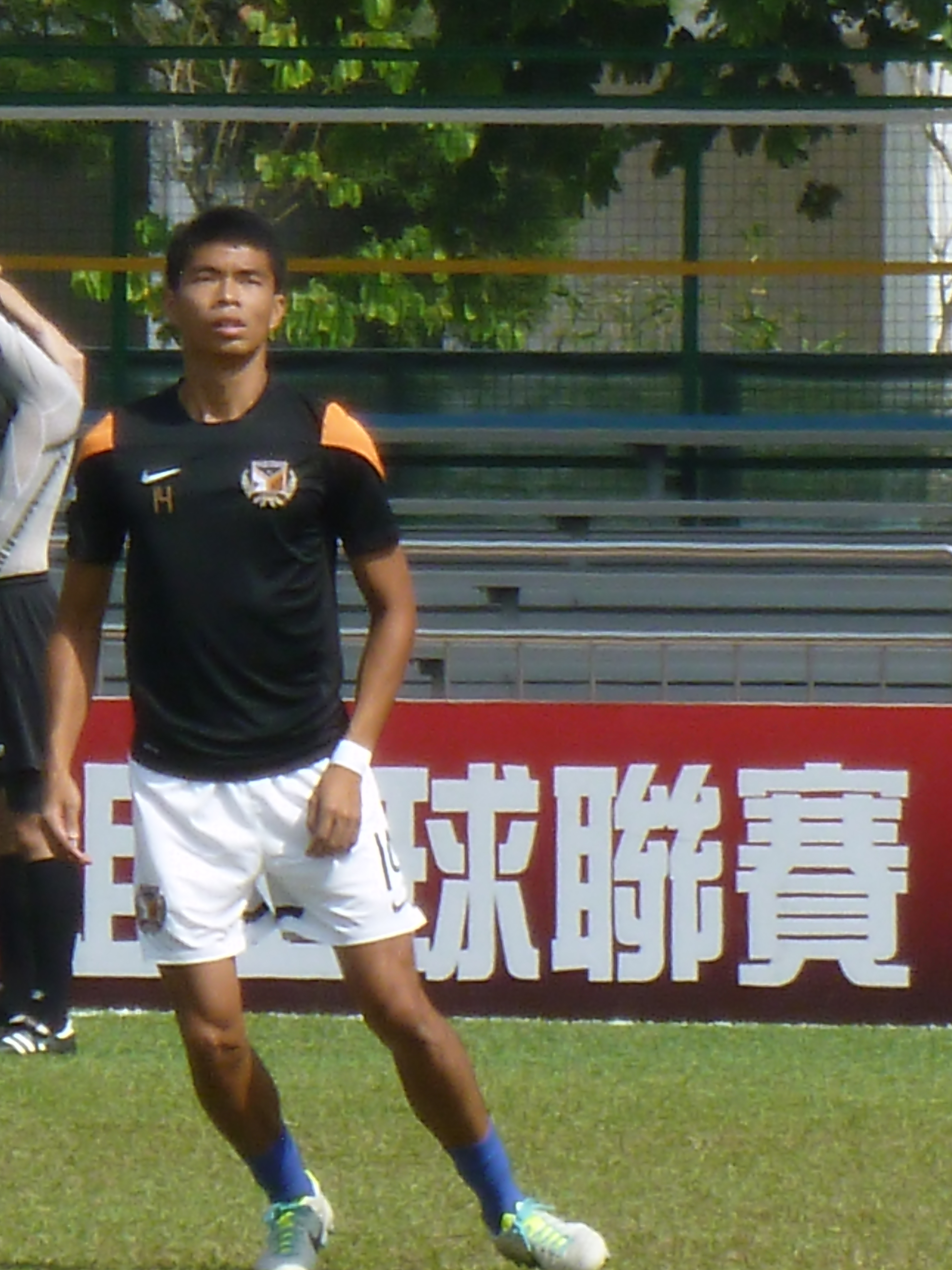

Personal information
- Full name: Chan Ka Chun
- Date of birth: 16 August 1988 (age 38)
- Place of birth: Hong Kong
- Height: 1.80 m (5 ft 11 in)
- Position: Midfielder

Team information
- Current team: Yuen Long
- Number: 14

Youth career
- 2006–2008: South China

Senior career*
Years	Team	Apps	(Gls)
2008–2009	South China	0	(0)
2008–2009	→ TSW Pegasus (loan)	2	(0)
2009–2011	Kitchee	0	(0)
2009–2011	→ Tai Chung (loan)	14	(0)
2011–2015	Yuen Long	45	(3)
2015–2018	Wing Yee	62	(18)
2019–2020	Leaper	8	(1)
2019–2020	Hong Kong Rangers	15	(1)
2020–	Yuen Long	83	(8)

International career
2008	Hong Kong U-23	3	(2)
- * Club domestic league appearances and goals as of 17:29, 28 September 2026

Chan Ka Chun (Chinese: 陳嘉晉; Cantonese Yale: Chàn Gājeun, born 16 August 1988 in Hong Kong) is a former Hong Kong football player. His usual position is midfielder. Before the start of the 2007–08 season, he was sent to Japan together with Lai Man Fei for overseas training with the U-19 team of Yokohama F. Marinos, the guest team of BMA Cup organised by South China in early 2007. The original duration of the training was one year, but it depended on their performance in the first month to decide whether they could stay for the rest of the period.

He made his debut for the SCAA first squad in the starting line-up for SCAA's AFC Cup away match on 16 April 2008 against Kedah FA from Malaysia.

== Career statistics ==
As of 14 May 2008

Club	Season	League		Senior Shield		League Cup		FA Cup		AFC Cup		Total	
Club	Season	Apps	Goals	Apps	Goals	Apps	Goals	Apps	Goals	Apps	Goals	Apps	Goals
South China	2007–08	0 (0)	0	0 (0)	0	0 (0)	0	0 (0)	0	1 (0)	0	1 (0)	0
All		0 (0)	0	0 (0)	0	0 (0)	0	0 (0)	0	1 (0)	0	1 (0)	0
TSW Pegasus	2008–09	1 (1)	0	0 (0)	0	0 (0)	0	0 (0)	0	N/A	N/A	1 (1)	0
All		1 (1)	0	0 (0)	0	0 (0)	0	0 (0)	0	N/A	N/A	1 (1)	0
Kitchee	2009–10	0 (0)	0	0 (0)	0	0 (0)	0	0 (0)	0	N/A	N/A	0 (0)	0
All		0 (0)	0	0 (0)	0	0 (0)	0	0 (0)	0	0 (0)	0	0 (0)	0
Tai Chung	2009–10	5 (1)	0	1 (0)	1	0 (0)	0	0 (0)	0	N/A	N/A	6 (1)	1
All		5 (1)	0	1 (0)	1	0 (0)	0	0 (0)	0	0 (0)	0	6 (1)	1
