= Lai Man Fei =

Hong Kong footballer

Personal information
- Full name: Lai Man Fei
- Date of birth: 10 December 1988 (age 37)
- Place of birth: Hong Kong
- Height: 1.83 m (6 ft 0 in)
- Positions: Centre back; defensive midfielder

Youth career
- –2006: Tuen Mun
- 2006–2007: South China

Senior career*
| Years | Team | Apps | (Gls) |
| 2007–2011 | South China | 0 | (0) |
| 2008–2011 | → Pegasus (loan) | 21 | (1) |
| 2011–2013 | Yuen Long | | (46) |
| 2013–2014 | Pegasus | 0 | (0) |
| 2019 | Tung Sing | 10 | (2) |
| 2020–2025 | Yuen Long | 46 | (2) |
| 2025 | Tuen Mun | 1 | (0) |

International career
| 2009–2014 | Hong Kong U-23 | | |
| 2010 | Hong Kong | 2 | (0) |
Medal record
Representing Hong Kong
East Asian Games
| Gold medal – first place | 2009 Hong Kong | Football |
- * Club domestic league appearances and goals

Lai Man Fei (Chinese: 賴文飛; Jyutping: laai^{6} man^{4} fei^{1}, born 10 December 1988) is a former Hong Kong professional footballer who played as a centre back.

== Club career ==
Lai joined South China's reserve team in 2006 and was promoted to the first team in the next year. However, before the start of the 2007–08 season, he was sent to Japan together with Chan Ka Chun for overseas training with the U-19 team of Yokohama F. Marinos, the guest team of BMA Cup organized by South China in early 2007.

Lai made his debut for the South China first team as a substitute coming up in South China's first AFC Cup match on 11 March 2008 against Home United from Singapore.

== Honour ==
Hong Kong

- 2009 East Asian Games Football Event: Gold

== Career statistics ==
=== Club ===
As of 3 August 2009

| Club | Season | League | | Senior Shield | | League Cup | | FA Cup | | AFC Cup | | Total | |
| Club | Season | Apps | Goals | Apps | Goals | Apps | Goals | Apps | Goals | Apps | Goals | Apps | Goals |
|---|---|---|---|---|---|---|---|---|---|---|---|---|---|
| South China | 2007-08 | 0 (0) | 0 | 0 (0) | 0 | 0 (0) | 0 | 0 (0) | 0 | 4 (1) | 0 | 4 (1) | 0 |
| South China | All | 0 (0) | 0 | 0 (0) | 0 | 0 (0) | 0 | 0 (0) | 0 | 4 (1) | 0 | 4 (1) | 0 |
| TSW Pegasus | 2008-09 | 8 (1) | 0 | 1 (1) | 0 | 0 (0) | 0 | 0 (0) | 0 | N/A | N/A | 9 (2) | 0 |
| TSW Pegasus | 2009-10 | 2 (0) | 0 | 0 (0) | 0 | 0 (0) | 0 | 0 (0) | 0 | N/A | N/A | 2 (0) | 0 |
| TSW Pegasus | All | 10 (1) | 0 | 1 (1) | 0 | 0 (0) | 0 | 0 (0) | 0 | N/A | N/A | 11 (2) | 0 |
