= Chan Siu Yuen =

Hong Kong footballer

Chan Siu Yuen 陳韶遠
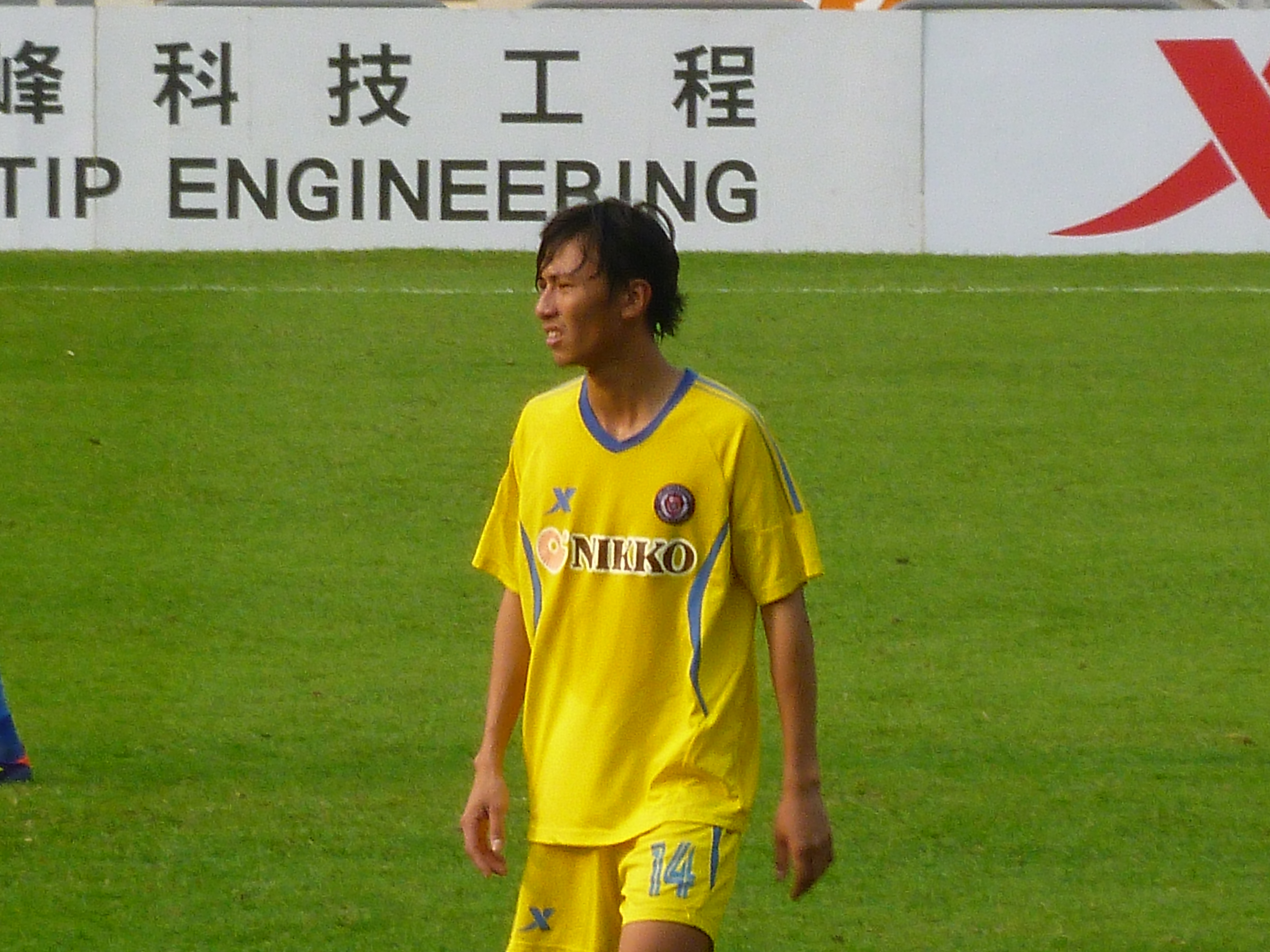

Personal information
- Full name: Chan Siu Yuen
- Date of birth: 2 November 1987 (age 38)
- Place of birth: Hong Kong
- Height: 1.83 m (6 ft 0 in)
- Positions: Centre back; defensive midfielder

Youth career
- 1999–2004: Hong Kong Rangers

Senior career*
Years	Team	Apps	(Gls)
2004–2013	Hong Kong Rangers	106	(0)
2013–2014	Citizen	15	(0)
2014–2015	Wong Tai Sin	12	(0)
2015–2016	Double Flower	19	(0)
2016–2017	Tung Sing	21	(1)
2017–2019	Citizen	37	(4)
2020–2022	Citizen	23	(0)
2022–2023	Sai Kung	14	(2)

International career
- Hong Kong U-23
2010	Hong Kong	2	(0)
Medal record
Representing Hong Kong
East Asian Games
Gold medal – first place	2009 Hong Kong	Football
- * Club domestic league appearances and goals as of 30 June 2015

Chan Siu Yuen (Chinese: 陳韶遠; Cantonese Yale: Chàn sìuyún; born 2 November 1987) is a former Hong Kong professional footballer who played as a centre back or a defensive midfielder.

== Honour ==
Hong Kong

- 2009 East Asian Games Football Event: Gold

== Career statistics ==
=== Club ===
As of 31 May 2014

Club performance			League		Cup				League Cup		Continental		Total	
Season	Club	League	Apps	Goals	Apps	Goals	Apps	Goals	Apps	Goals	Apps	Goals	Apps	Goals
Hong Kong			League		Senior Shield		FA Cup		League Cup		AFC Cup		Total	
2007–08	Bulova Rangers	First Division	13	0	2	0	1	0	4	0	N/A	N/A	20	0
2008–09	Fourway Athletics	First Division	20	0	3	0	3	0	2	0	N/A	N/A	28	0
2009–10	Fourway Rangers	First Division	15	0	0	0	2	0	N/A	N/A	N/A	N/A	17	0
2010–11	Fourway Rangers	First Division	17	0	2	0	1	0	2	0	N/A	N/A	22	0
2011–12	Biu Chun Rangers	First Division	14	0	2	0	2	0	1	0	N/A	N/A	19	0
2012–13	Biu Chun Rangers	First Division	15	0	2	0	2	0	—	—	N/A	N/A	19	0
Rangers Total			94	0	11	0	11	0	9	0	0	0	125	0
2013–14	Citizen	First Division	15	0	1	0	2	0	—	—	N/A	N/A	18	0
Citizen Total			15	0	1	0	2	0	0	0	0	0	18	0
Career Total			109	0	12	0	13	0	9	0	0	0	143	0
