= 2015–16 Hong Kong Premier League =

Hong Kong Premier League
- Season: 2015–16
- Champions: Eastern
- Relegated: Dreams Metro Gallery; Wong Tai Sin
- AFC Champions League: Kitchee; Eastern
- Matches: 72
- Goals: 213 (2.96 per match)
- Top goalscorer: (Brazil) Giovane da Silva (Eastern) (Montenegro) Admir Adrović (Pegasus) (10 goals)
- Best goalkeeper: Yapp Hung Fai (Eastern)
- Biggest home win: Kitchee 4–0 Yuen Long (12 September 2015); South China 4–0 Dreams Metro Gallery (13 December 2015); Eastern 4–0 Rangers (5 March 2016)
- Biggest away win: Yuen Long 1–6 Eastern (13 December 2015)
- Highest scoring: Southern 6–3 Dreams Metro Gallery (9 January 2016)
- Longest winning run: 6 matches: Kitchee
- Longest unbeaten run: 12 matches: Kitchee
- Longest winless run: 10 matches: Wong Tai Sin
- Longest losing run: 4 matches: Wong Tai Sin
- Highest attendance: 4,130; Eastern 3–1 South China (10 January 2016)
- Lowest attendance: 271; Rangers 0–0 Southern (12 December 2015)
- Total attendance: 73,334
- Average attendance: 1,019

2015–16 Hong Kong Premier League (also known as BOCG Life Hong Kong Premier League for sponsorship reasons) was the 2nd season of Hong Kong Premier League, the top division of Hong Kong football.

== Teams ==
A total of 9 teams contested the league, including eight sides from the 2014–15 Hong Kong Premier League and one promoted from the 2014–15 Hong Kong First Division.

=== Stadia and locations ===
Locations of the 2015–16 Hong Kong Premier League teams

Note: Table lists in alphabetical order.

Team	Stadium	Location	District	Capacity
Dreams Metro Gallery	Sham Shui Po Sports Ground	Cheung Sha Wan	Sham Shui Po	2,194
Eastern	Mong Kok Stadium	Mong Kok	Yau Tsim Mong	6,769
Pegasus	Hong Kong Stadium	So Kon Po	Wan Chai	40,000
Kitchee	Mong Kok Stadium	Mong Kok	Yau Tsim Mong	6,769
Rangers	Kowloon Bay Park	Kowloon Bay	Kwun Tong	1,200
South China	Tseung Kwan O Sports Ground	Tseung Kwan O	Sai Kung	3,500
Southern	Aberdeen Sports Ground	Aberdeen	Southern	4,000^{1}
Wong Tai Sin	Hammer Hill Sports Ground	Choi Hung	Wong Tai Sin	2,200
Yuen Long	Yuen Long Stadium	Yuen Long	Yuen Long	4,932

Remarks:
^{1}The capacity of Aberdeen Sports Ground reduces from 9,000 to 4,000 as only the main stand is opened for football matches.

=== Personnel and kits ===
Team	Chairman	Head coach	Captain	Kitmaker	Shirt sponsor
Dreams Metro Gallery	Lo Man Fai	Leung Chi Wing	(Spain) Pablo Gallardo	Nike	Fu Ho Restaurant
Eastern	Lam Kin Ming	Chan Yuen Ting	Yapp Hung Fai	Adidas	—N/a
Pegasus	Canny Leung	Lee Chi Kin	Kwok Kin Pong	Adidas	—N/a
Kitchee	Ken Ng	Chu Chi Kwong	Lo Kwan Yee	Nike	Jockey Club Kitchee Centre
Rangers	Mok Yiu Keung	Yan Lik Kin	(Brazil) Beto	Xtep	Kunne
South China	Wallace Cheung	(Brazil) Ricardo Rambo	Chan Wai Ho	Adidas	Panasonic
Southern	Chan Man Chun	Cheng Siu Chung	(Spain) José María Díaz	Nike	Kwoon Chung Motors（Home Jersey） Isuzu（Guest Jersey）
Wong Tai Sin	Ma Hung Ming	Chiu Chung Man; Poon Man Chun	(Japan) Yuto Nakamura	Joma	—N/a
Yuen Long	Wong Wai Shun	Fung Hoi Man	(Brazil) Fábio Lopes	Nike	Itacho Sushi

=== Chairman changes ===
Team	Outgoing Chairman	Date of vacancy	Incoming Chairman	Date of appointment
Dreams Metro Gallery	Khan Swadiq (as YFCMD)	1 July 2015	Lo Man Fai	1 July 2015
Pegasus	Cheng Ting Kong (as Pegasus)	1 July 2015	Canny Leung	1 July 2015

=== Managerial changes ===
Team	Outgoing manager	Manner of departure	Date of vacancy	Position in table	Incoming manager	Date of appointment
Yuen Long	Chan Ho Yin	Sacked	3 May 2015	Pre-season	Fung Hoi Man	9 June 2015
Kitchee	(Spain) José Molina	Resigned	27 May 2015	Pre-season	(Spain) Abraham García	21 July 2015
Eastern	Cristiano Cordeiro	Sacked	1 June 2015	Pre-season	Yeung Ching Kwong	8 June 2015
Southern	Fung Hoi Man	Signed by Yuen Long	9 June 2015	Pre-season	Cheng Siu Chung	9 June 2015
Pegasus	Chan Chi Hong	Resigned	30 June 2015	Pre-season	Lee Chi Kin	8 July 2015
Rangers	Yan Lik Kin	Return as Assistant Manager	24 July 2015	Pre-season	(Brazil) Ricardo	24 July 2015
Eastern	Yeung Ching Kwong	Signed by Meizhou Wuhua	13 December 2015	1st	Chan Yuen Ting	13 December 2015
Rangers	(Brazil) Ricardo	Signed by South China	2 March 2016	8th	Yan Lik Kin	2 March 2016
Kitchee	(Spain) Abraham García	Resigned	5 Mar 2016	2nd	Chu Chi Kwong	5 Mar 2016
South China	(Brazil) Casemiro Mior	Sacked	13 Mar 2016	3rd	(Brazil) Ricardo	13 Mar 2016

=== Foreign players ===
The number of foreign players is restricted to six (including an Asian player) per team, with no more than four on pitch during matches.

Club	Player 1	Player 2	Player 3	Player 4	Player 5	Asian Player
Rangers	(Brazil) Mauricio	(Brazil) Paulo César	(France) Quentin Lendresse	(Spain) Dieguito	(Spain) Ernesto Gómez	(South Korea) Gee Kyung-hun
Dreams Metro Gallery	(Spain) Pablo Gallardo	(Brazil) Leonidas	(Croatia) Miroslav Saric			(Japan) Kenji Fukuda
Eastern	(Australia) James Meyer	(Brazil) Clayton	(Brazil) Diego Eli	(Brazil) Giovane	(Brazil) Michel Lugo	(Australia) Andrew Barisic
Wong Tai Sin	(Brazil) Everton Camargo	(Brazil) Naves	(Brazil) Reinaldo	(Serbia) Mirko Teodorović	(South Korea) Yoon Dong-hun	(Japan) Yuto Nakamura
Pegasus	(Brazil) Dhiego Martins	(Brazil) Eduardo Praes	(Brazil) João Emir	(North Macedonia) Kristijan Naumovski	(Montenegro) Admir Adrović	
Southern	(Brazil) Tomas	(Brazil) Wellingsson	(Spain) Jonathan Carril	(Spain) José María Díaz	(Spain) Diego Garrido	
Kitchee	(Brazil) Fernando	(Spain) Dani Cancela	(Spain) Fernando Recio	(Spain) Rufino	(Spain) Jordi Tarrés	(South Korea) Kim Tae-Min
South China	(Brazil) Luiz Carlos	(Cameroon) Mahama Awal	(Ecuador) Félix Borja	(Ecuador) Cristian Mora	(Serbia) Bojan Mališić	(Australia) Ryan Griffiths
Yuen Long	(Brazil) Fábio Lopes	(Brazil) Gustavo Silva	(Brazil) Luciano Silva	(Brazil) Stefan	(Serbia) Aleksandar Ranđelović	(South Korea) Park Chan-Jong

==== Former players ====
Club	Player 1	Player 2	Player 3	Player 4
Dreams Metro Gallery	(Brazil) Clayton			
Eastern	(Croatia) Miroslav Saric	(South Korea) Han Jae-woong		
Pegasus	(Australia) Dane Milovanović	(Croatia) Ivan Miličević	(Serbia) Dušan Martinović	(Slovenia) Nejc Mevlja
Kitchee	(Spain) Juan Belencoso			
Rangers	(Brazil) Santaiana	(Thailand) Panudech Maiwong		
Southern				
South China	(Brazil) Lucas Silva	(Liberia) Boima Karpeh	(Timor-Leste) Murilo	
Wong Tai Sin	(Brazil) Leonidas	(Japan) Kohei Ito		
Yuen Long	(Spain) José Cruz			

== League table ==
Pos	Team	Pld	W	D	L	GF	GA	GD	Pts	Qualification or relegation
1	Eastern	16	12	2	2	35	13	+22	38	Qualification to Champions League group stage
2	Kitchee	16	11	4	1	32	11	+21	37	Qualification to season play-off and Champions League preliminary round 2
3	South China	16	9	2	5	26	21	+5	29	Qualification to season play-off (Note: Since the winners of the Senior Shield, Eastern, and the winners of the League Cup, Kitchee, qualified for AFC competitions and the Season Play-off respectively based on league position, the spots awarded to the Senior Shield winner and the League Cup winner for the Season Play-off were awarded to the third and fourth placed team in the league. Pegasus qualified as winners of the FA Cup.)
4	Southern	16	6	5	5	26	21	+5	23	Qualification to season play-off
5	Pegasus	16	4	5	7	22	27	−5	17	Qualification to season play-off
6	Dreams Metro Gallery	16	4	4	8	19	30	−11	16	Relegation to First Division (Note: Both Dreams Metro Gallery and Wong Tai Sin did not apply for the next season's Hong Kong Premier League Licence.)
7	Yuen Long	16	3	6	7	21	32	−11	15	
8	Rangers	16	2	5	9	15	29	−14	11 (Note: Rangers wins head-to-head against Wong Tai Sin.)	
9	Wong Tai Sin	16	2	5	9	17	29	−12	11	Relegation to First Division

Source: Hong Kong Football Association
Rules for classification: 1) Points; 2) Head-to-head points; 3) Head-to-head goal difference; 4) Head-to-head goals scored; 5) Goal difference; 6) Goals scored; 7) Fair-play points; 8) Drawing lots (Play-off if the winner has to be decided)

== Positions by round ==
To preserve the chronological order of events, any postponed matches are not included to the round at which they were originally scheduled, but added to the full round they were played immediately afterwards. For example, if a match is scheduled for round 7, but then played between rounds 8 and 9, it will be added to the standings for round 8.

Team ╲ Round	1	2	3	4	5	6	7	8	9	10	11	12	13	14	15	16	17	18
Eastern	3	1	2	1	1	1	1	1	1	1	1	1	1	1	1	1	1	1
Kitchee	1	3	4	5	4	4	5	3	3	3	3	3	2	2	2	2	2	2
South China	6	8	5	4	2	2	2	2	2	2	2	2	3	3	3	3	3	3
Southern	4	7	8	8	6	6	6	6	5	4	5	5	6	4	4	4	4	4
Pegasus	5	2	1	2	3	3	4	5	6	5	6	6	4	5	5	5	5	5
Dreams Metro Gallery	2	4	3	3	5	5	3	4	4	6	4	4	5	6	6	6	6	6
Yuen Long	9	6	7	7	8	8	7	8	7	7	7	7	7	8	8	8	7	7
Rangers	7	5	6	6	7	7	8	7	9	9	9	8	8	9	9	9	9	8
Wong Tai Sin	8	9	9	9	9	9	9	9	8	8	8	9	9	7	7	7	8	9

Leader - 2017 AFC Champions League play-off stage
Relegation to 2016–17 Hong Kong First Division League

Source: Hong Kong Football Association website

== Results ==
Home \ Away	HKR	DMG	EAA	KCS	KIT	PEG	SCA	WTS	YLF
Rangers		0–0	1–2	0–0	0–2	3–2	0–2	2–1	1–1
Dreams Metro Gallery	1–1		0–4	1–1	2–1	0–3	0–1	2–0	3–2
Eastern	4–0	1–0		0–2	1–1	4–2	3–1	1–0	3–0
Southern	3–2	6–3	1–2		1–1	3–3	2–3	2–0	2–0
Kitchee	2–1	1–1	2–0	2–0		2–0	4–2	2–1	4–0
Pegasus	1–0	0–3	0–0	0–1	2–4		0–2	2–0	1–1
South China	2–0	4–0	1–2	1–0	0–3	0–2		2–1	2–1
Wong Tai Sin	3–3	3–2	1–2	2–1	0–0	2–2	1–1		1–1
Yuen Long	3–1	2–1	1–6	1–1	0–1	2–2	2–2	4–1	

Source: Hong Kong Football Association
Legend: Blue = home team win; Yellow = draw; Red = away team win.

== Fixtures and results ==
=== Round 1 ===
12 September 2015	Dreams Metro Gallery	2–0	Wong Tai Sin	Cheung Sha Wan, Kowloon
14:30 (UTC+8)	Tse Long Hin 6'; Wong Tsz Ho 54'	Report		Stadium: Sham Shui Po Sports Ground; Attendance: 1,078; Referee: Tong Kui Sum

12 September 2015	Kitchee	4–0	Yuen Long	Mong Kok, Kowloon
17:30 (UTC+8)	Jordi 36', 45+2', 90+3'; Paulinho 83'	Report		Stadium: Mongkok Stadium; Attendance: 1,933; Referee: Ho Wai Sing

13 September 2015	Southern	3–3	Pegasus	Aberdeen, Hong Kong Island
14:30 (UTC+8)	Díaz 27'; Michael Luk 52'; Souza 58' (pen.)	Report	Adrović 31', 42' (pen.); Emir 66'	Stadium: Aberdeen Sports Ground; Attendance: 689; Referee: Liu Kwok Man

13 September 2015	Rangers	1–2	Eastern	Kowloon Bay, Kowloon
17:30 (UTC+8)	Hui Wang Fung 35'	Report	Roberto 75'; Barisic 82'	Stadium: Kowloon Bay Park; Attendance: 966; Referee: Ng Chiu Kok

=== Round 2 ===
18 September 2015	Rangers	1–1	Yuen Long	Kowloon Bay, Kowloon
20:00 (UTC+8)	Lendresse 50'	Report	Yip Tsz Chun 90+4'	Stadium: Kowloon Bay Park; Attendance: 306; Referee: Tong Kui Sum

19 September 2015	Dreams Metro Gallery	0–3	Pegasus	Cheung Sha Wan, Kowloon
14:30 (UTC+8)		Report	Adrović 24'; Lee Ka Yiu 63'; Emir 88'	Stadium: Sham Shui Po Sports Ground; Attendance: 927; Referee: Chan Ming Siu

19 September 2015	Eastern	1–0	Wong Tai Sin	Mong Kok, Kowloon
17:30 (UTC+8)	Barisic 23'	Report		Stadium: Mong Kok Stadium; Attendance: 1,627; Referee: Lau Fong Hei

23 December 2015	Kitchee	4–2	South China	Mong Kok, Kowloon
20:00 (UTC+8)	Paulinho 19'; Fernando 47'; Sandro 87'; Alex 90+4'	Report	Chan Siu Ki 12'; Carlos 90+5'	Stadium: Mong Kok Stadium; Attendance: 3,630; Referee: Tong Kui Sum

=== Round 3 ===
26 September 2015	South China	1–0	Southern	Tseung Kwan O, New Territories
14:30 (UTC+8)	Lucas 52'	Report		Stadium: Tseung Kwan O Sports Ground; Attendance: 757; Referee: Ho Wai Sing

26 September 2015	Eastern	1–1	Kitchee	Mong Kok, Kowloon
17:30 (UTC+8)	Festus 90+5'	Report	Belencoso 4'	Stadium: Mong Kok Stadium; Attendance: 2,555; Referee: Tong Kui Sum

27 September 2015	Dreams Metro Gallery	3–2	Yuen Long	Cheung Sha Wan, Kowloon
14:30 (UTC+8)	Fukuda 11' (pen.), 21'; Lau Hok Ming 77'	Report	Cruz 90+1'; Luciano 90+3'	Stadium: Sham Shui Po Sports Ground; Attendance: 580; Referee: Liu Kwok Man

27 September 2015	Pegasus	1–0	Rangers	Mong Kok, Kowloon
17:30 (UTC+8)	Emir 65'	Report		Stadium: Mong Kok Stadium; Attendance: 787; Referee: Ching Oi Cho

=== Round 4 ===
16 October 2015	South China	2–1	Wong Tai Sin	Tseung Kwan O, New Territories
20:00 (UTC+8)	Carlos 3'; Awal 78'	Report	Kohei Ito 16'	Stadium: Tseung Kwan O Sports Ground; Attendance: 910; Referee: Ng Chiu Kok

17 October 2015	Southern	1–2	Eastern	Aberdeen, Hong Kong Island
14:30 (UTC+8)	Souza 9'	Report	Diego 5'; Ju Yingzhi 69'	Stadium: Aberdeen Sports Ground; Attendance: 780; Referee: Ho Wai Sing

17 October 2015	Pegasus	1–1	Yuen Long	Mong Kok, Kowloon
18:00 (UTC+8)	Kwok Kin Pong 24'	Report	Yuan Yang 18'	Stadium: Mongkok Stadium; Attendance: 658; Referee: Ching Oi Cho

18 October 2015	Rangers	0–0	Dreams Metro Gallery	Kowloon Bay, Kowloon
17:30 (UTC+8)		Report		Stadium: Kowloon Bay Park; Attendance: 365; Referee: Tang Hing Fu

=== Round 5 ===
31 October 2015	Southern	2–0	Wong Tai Sin	Aberdeen, Hong Kong Island
14:30 (UTC+8)	Díaz 37'; Michael Luk 45+2'	Report		Stadium: Aberdeen Sports Ground; Attendance: 345; Referee: Tong Kui Sum

31 October 2015	Pegasus	0–2	South China	Mong Kok, Kowloon
18:00 (UTC+8)		Report	Itaparica 11'; Carlos 80'	Stadium: Mong Kok Stadium; Attendance: 2,378; Referee: Ho Wai Sing

1 November 2015	Eastern	1–0	Dreams Metro Gallery	Mong Kok, Kowloon
14:30 (UTC+8)	Lee Hong Lim 83'	Report		Stadium: Mong Kok Stadium; Attendance: 1,520; Referee: Ng Chiu Kok

1 November 2015	Rangers	0–2	Kitchee	Kowloon Bay, Kowloon
17:30 (UTC+8)		Report	Paulinho 73'; Fernando 90+6'	Stadium: Kowloon Bay Park; Attendance: 511; Referee: Chan Ming Siu

=== Round 6 ===
16 February 2016	South China	2–1	Yuen Long	Tseung Kwan O, New Territories
20:00 (UTC+8)	Carlos 7'; Liang Zicheng 26'	Report	Stefan 88' (pen.)	Stadium: Tseung Kwan O Sports Ground; Attendance: 461; Referee: Tong Kui Sum

2 March 2016	Kitchee	2–0	Southern	Mong Kok, Kowloon
20:00 (UTC+8)	Chan Cham Hei 22' (o.g.); Sham Kwok Keung 82'	Report		Stadium: Mong Kok Stadium; Attendance: 694; Referee: Lau Fong Hei

16 March 2016	Eastern	4–2	Pegasus	Mong Kok, Kowloon
20:00 (UTC+8)	Lugo 8', 22'; Barisic 79', 82'	Report	Adrović 68', 90+1'	Stadium: Mong Kok Stadium; Attendance: 1,085; Referee: Ng Kai Lam

10 April 2016	Wong Tai Sin	3–3	Rangers	Choi Hung, Kowloon
14:30 (UTC+8)	Gee Kyung-hun 4' (o.g.); Everton 51'; Wong Chun Hin 90+1'	Report	Ernesto 25', 64'; Lendresse 38'	Stadium: Hammer Hill Road Sports Ground; Attendance: 592; Referee: Tong Kui Sum

=== Round 7 ===
28 November 2015	Wong Tai Sin	2–2	Pegasus	Choi Hung, Kowloon
14:30 (UTC+8)	Liu Pui Fung 33'; Chiu Chun Kit 65'	Report	Eduardo 23'; Adrović 60'	Stadium: Hammer Hill Road Sports Ground; Attendance: 470; Referee: Lau Fong Hei

28 November 2015	South China	2–0	Rangers	Tseung Kwan O, New Territories
17:30 (UTC+8)	Itaparica 39'; Awal 83'	Report		Stadium: Tseung Kwan O Sports Ground; Attendance: 928; Referee: Chan Ming Siu

29 November 2015	Dreams Metro Gallery	2–1	Kitchee	Cheung Sha Wan, Kowloon
14:30 (UTC+8)	Clayton 21'; Chu Siu Kei 33'	Report	Lam Ka Wai 45'	Stadium: Sham Shui Po Sports Ground; Attendance: 932; Referee: Ho Wai Sing

29 November 2015	Yuen Long	1–1	Southern	Yuen Long, New Territories
17:30 (UTC+8)	Yip Tsz Chun 3'	Report	Michael Luk 59'	Stadium: Yuen Long Stadium; Attendance: 1,051; Referee: Ng Chiu Kok

=== Round 8 ===
12 December 2015	Wong Tai Sin	0–0	Kitchee	Choi Hung, Kowloon
14:30 (UTC+8)		Report		Stadium: Hammer Hill Sports Ground; Attendance: 719; Referee: Chan Ming Siu

12 December 2015	Rangers	0–0	Southern	Kowloon Bay, Kowloon
17:30 (UTC+8)		Report		Stadium: Kowloon Bay Park; Attendance: 271; Referee: Ho Wai Sing

13 December 2015	South China	4–0	Dreams Metro Gallery	Tseung Kwan O, New Territories
14:30 (UTC+8)	Carlos 58'; Awal 71', 90+4'; Itaparica 84'	Report		Stadium: Tseung Kwan O Sports Ground; Attendance: 1,002; Referee: Liu Kwok Man

13 December 2015	Yuen Long	1–6	Eastern	Yuen Long, New Territories
17:30 (UTC+8)	Park Chan Jong 74'	Report	Diego 10'; Giovane 30', 69' (pen.), 90+1'; Barisic 54', 89'	Stadium: Yuen Long Stadium; Attendance: 1,418; Referee: Ng Chiu Kok

=== Round 9 ===
9 January 2016	Southern	6–3	Dreams Metro Gallery	Aberdeen, Hong Kong Island
14:30 (UTC+8)	Emmet Wan 3'; Souza 8' (pen.); Carril 19'; James Ha 45', 64'; Michael Luk 82'	Report	Leonidas 48'; Fukuda 60' (pen.), 81'	Stadium: Aberdeen Sports Ground; Attendance: 333; Referee: Tong Kui Sum

9 January 2016	Kitchee	2–0	Pegasus	Mong Kok, Kowloon
17:30 (UTC+8)	Fernando 63'; Alex 81'	Report		Stadium: Mong Kok Stadium; Attendance: 1,749; Referee: Chan Ming Siu

10 January 2016	Wong Tai Sin	1–1	Yuen Long	Choi Hung, Kowloon
14:30 (UTC+8)	Zhang Jun 48'	Report	Ip Chung Long 25'	Stadium: Hammer Hill Road Sports Ground; Attendance: 543; Referee: Ng Kai Lam

10 January 2016	Eastern	3–1	South China	Mong Kok, Kowloon
17:30 (UTC+8)	Giovane 23', 33'; Diego 50'	Report	Chan Siu Ki 90+4'	Stadium: Mong Kok Stadium; Attendance: 4,130; Referee: Ng Chiu Kok

=== Round 10 ===
16 January 2016	Southern	2–0	Yuen Long	Aberdeen, Hong Kong Island
14:30 (UTC+8)	Luciano 62' (o.g.); Tomas 83'	Report		Stadium: Aberdeen Sports Ground; Attendance: 308; Referee: Lau Fong Hei

16 January 2016	Kitchee	1–1	Dreams Metro Gallery	Mong Kok, Kowloon
17:30 (UTC+8)	Matt Lam 14'	Report	Leung Kwok Wai 90+4'	Stadium: Mong Kok Stadium; Attendance: 928; Referee: Ng Chiu Kok

17 January 2016	Pegasus	2–0	Wong Tai Sin	So Kon Po, Hong Kong Island
14:30 (UTC+8)	Adrović 19', 83'	Report		Stadium: Hong Kong Stadium; Attendance: 506; Referee: Tong Kui Sum

17 January 2016	Rangers	0–2	South China	Kowloon Bay, Kowloon
17:30 (UTC+8)		Report	Cheung Kin Fung 20'; Awal 43'	Stadium: Kowloon Bay Park; Attendance: 707; Referee: Ho Wai Sing

=== Round 11 ===
30 January 2016	Pegasus	0–3	Dreams Metro Gallery	So Kon Po, Hong Kong Island
14:30 (UTC+8)		Report	Fukuda 45+1'; Wong Tsz Ho 86'; Chung Wai Keung 90+1'	Stadium: Hong Kong Stadium; Attendance: 542; Referee: Chan Ming Siu

30 January 2016	South China	0–3	Kitchee	Tseung Kwan O, New Territories
17:30 (UTC+8)		Report	Rufino 17', 65'; Alex 79'	Stadium: Tseung Kwan O Sports Ground; Attendance: 2,010; Referee: Ching Oi Cho

31 January 2016	Wong Tai Sin	1–2	Eastern	Choi Hung, Kowloon
14:30 (UTC+8)	Nakamura 89' (pen.)	Report	Roberto 42'; Giovane 51'	Stadium: Hammer Hill Road Sports Ground; Attendance: 959; Referee: Tong Kui Sum

31 January 2016	Yuen Long	3–1	Rangers	Yuen Long, New Territories
17:30 (UTC+8)	Stefan 16', 59'; Ip Chung Long 67'	Report	Chuck Yiu Kwok 48'	Stadium: Yuen Long Stadium; Attendance: 647; Referee: Lau Fong Hei

=== Round 12 ===
20 February 2016	Southern	1–1	Kitchee	Aberdeen, Hong Kong Island
14:30 (UTC+8)	Díaz 44'	Report	Jared Lum 45+2'	Stadium: Aberdeen Sports Ground; Attendance: 552; Referee: Tang Hing Fu

20 February 2016	Yuen Long	2–2	South China	Yuen Long, New Territories
19:00 (UTC+8)	Park Chan-jong 80'; Ranđelović 85'	Report	Griffiths 18'; Awal 78'	Stadium: Yuen Long Stadium; Attendance: 1,351; Referee: Ng Chiu Kok

21 February 2016	Pegasus	0–0	Eastern	So Kon Po, Hong Kong Island
14:30 (UTC+8)		Report		Stadium: Hong Kong Stadium; Attendance: 1,379; Referee: Lau Fong Hei

21 February 2016	Rangers	2–1	Wong Tai Sin	Kowloon Bay, Kowloon
17:30 (UTC+8)	Ernesto 20'; Mauricio 79'	Report	Liu Pui Fung 25'	Stadium: Kowloon Bay Park; Attendance: 294; Referee: Ng Kai Lam

=== Round 13 ===
27 February 2016	Dreams Metro Gallery	0–4	Eastern	Cheung Sha Wan, Kowloon
14:30 (UTC+8)		Report	Clayton 17'; Lugo 52', 90'; Andy Nägelein 88'	Stadium: Sham Shui Po Sports Ground; Attendance: 1,131; Referee: Ng Chiu Kok

28 February 2016	Wong Tai Sin	2–1	Southern	Choi Hung, Kowloon
14:30 (UTC+8)	Everton 84'; Aender 89'	Report	Tomas 45+1'	Stadium: Hammer Hill Road Sports Ground; Attendance: 530; Referee: Ho Wai Sing

28 February 2016	Kitchee	2–1	Rangers	Mong Kok, Kowloon
17:30 (UTC+8)	Rufino 16' (pen.); Alex 81'	Report	Mauricio 70'	Stadium: Mong Kok Stadium; Attendance: 979; Referee: Tong Kui Sum

29 February 2016	South China	0–2	Pegasus	Tseung Kwan O, New Territories
20:00 (UTC+8)		Report	Fong Pak Lun 45'; McKee 69'	Stadium: Tseung Kwan O Sports Ground; Attendance: 745; Referee: Liu Kwok Man

=== Round 14 ===
5 March 2016	Yuen Long	0–1	Kitchee	Yuen Long, New Territories
14:30 (UTC+8)		Report	Sandro 73'	Stadium: Yuen Long Stadium; Attendance: 1,138; Referee: Ng Chiu Kok

5 March 2016	Eastern	4–0	Rangers	Mong Kok, Kowloon
17:30 (UTC+8)	Lugo 3'; Diego 37'; Beto 57' (o.g.); Giovane 88'	Report		Stadium: Mong Kok Stadium; Attendance: 1,366; Referee: Luk Kin Sun

6 March 2016	Wong Tai Sin	3–2	Dreams Metro Gallery	Choi Hung, Kowloon
14:30 (UTC+8)	Reinaldo 35'; Everton 55' (pen.); Chiu Chun Kit 60'	Report	Nunez 21'; Fukuda 24'	Stadium: Hammer Hill Road Sports Ground; Attendance: 552; Referee: Chan Ming Siu

6 March 2016	Pegasus	0–1	Southern	So Kon Po, Hong Kong Island
17:30 (UTC+8)		Report	James Ha 76'	Stadium: Hong Kong Stadium; Attendance: 582; Referee: Tong Kui Sum

=== Round 15 ===
12 March 2016	Wong Tai Sin	1–1	South China	Choi Hung, Kowloon
14:30 (UTC+8)	Aender 63'	Report	Griffiths 30'	Stadium: Hammer Hill Road Sports Ground; Attendance: 962; Referee: Ching Oi Cho

12 March 2016	Eastern	0–2	Southern	Mong Kok, Kowloon
17:30 (UTC+8)		Report	Michael Luk 11'; Souza 28'	Stadium: Mong Kok Stadium; Attendance: 1,438; Referee: Chan Ming Siu

13 March 2016	Dreams Metro Gallery	1–1	Rangers	Cheung Sha Wan, Kowloon
14:30 (UTC+8)	Wong Tsz Ho 37'	Report	Ernesto 31'	Stadium: Sham Shui Po Sports Ground; Attendance: 551; Referee: Liu Kwok Man

13 March 2016	Yuen Long	2–2	Pegasus	Yuen Long, New Territories
17:30 (UTC+8)	Gustavo 56'; Yip Tsz Chun 90+6'	Report	McKee 58'; Lee Ka Yiu 67'	Stadium: Yuen Long Stadium; Attendance: 861; Referee: Lau Fong Hei

=== Round 16 ===
2 April 2016	Southern	3–2	Rangers	Aberdeen, Hong Kong Island
14:30 (UTC+8)	Garrido 48'; Ngue 80'; Souza 82'	Report	Lendresse 67', 89'	Stadium: Aberdeen Sports Ground; Attendance: 336; Referee: Ng Chiu Kok

2 April 2016	Kitchee	2–1	Wong Tai Sin	Mong Kok, Kowloon
17:30 (UTC+8)	Rufino 4'; Alex 46'	Report	Liu Pui Fung 49'	Stadium: Mong Kok Stadium; Attendance: 1,161; Referee: Lau Fong Hei

3 April 2016	Dreams Metro Gallery	0–1	South China	Cheung Sha Wan, Kowloon
14:30 (UTC+8)		Report	Griffiths 16'	Stadium: Sham Shui Po Sports Ground; Attendance: 924; Referee: Luk Kin Sun

3 April 2016	Eastern	3–0	Yuen Long	Mong Kok, Kowloon
17:30 (UTC+8)	Diego 18'; Barisic 63'; Giovane 79'	Report		Stadium: Mong Kok Stadium; Attendance: 1,546; Referee: Tong Kui Sum

=== Round 17 ===
22 April 2016	South China	1–2	Eastern	Tseung Kwan O, New Territories
20:00 (UTC+8)	Griffiths 60' (pen.)	Report	Giovane 26', 44'	Stadium: Tseung Kwan O Sports Ground; Attendance: 2,292; Referee: Lau Fong Hei

23 April 2016	Pegasus	2–4	Kitchee	Mong Kok, Kowloon
14:30 (UTC+8)	Adrović 50' (pen.); Lo Kong Wai 86'	Report	Alex 37'; Sandro 39', 64'; Cheng Chin Lung 90+2'	Stadium: Mong Kok Stadium; Attendance: 1,015; Referee: Luk Kin Sun

24 April 2016	Dreams Metro Gallery	1–1	Southern	Cheung Sha Wan, Kowloon
14:30 (UTC+8)	Yiu Ho Ming 64'	Report	Díaz 53'	Stadium: Sham Shui Po Sports Ground; Attendance: 574; Referee: Tong Kui Sum

24 April 2016	Yuen Long	4–1	Wong Tai Sin	Yuen Long, New Territories
17:30 (UTC+8)	Ranđelović 11'; Chan Cheuk Kwong 45+3'; Stefan 57'; Yuan Yang 90'	Report	Nakamura 9' (pen.)	Stadium: Yuen Long Stadium; Attendance: 1,389; Referee: Liu Kwok Man

=== Round 18 ===
7 May 2016	Kitchee	2–0	Eastern	Mong Kok, Kowloon
14:30 (UTC+8)	Alex 20'; Matt Lam 32'	Report		Stadium: Mong Kok Stadium; Attendance: 1,677; Referee: Ng Chiu Kok

7 May 2016	Yuen Long	2–1	Dreams Metro Gallery	Yuen Long, New Territories
14:30 (UTC+8)	Luciano 53'; Park Chan-jong 63'	Report	Yiu Ho Ming 70'	Stadium: Yuen Long Stadium; Attendance: 756; Referee: Tong Kui Sum

7 May 2016	Rangers	3–2	Pegasus	Cheung Sha Wan, Kowloon
14:30 (UTC+8)	Lendresse 8', 65'; Chuck Yiu Kwok 26'	Report	Emir 41'; Adrović 52' (pen.)	Stadium: Sham Shui Po Sports Ground; Attendance: 394; Referee: Ho Wai Sing

7 May 2016	Southern	2–3	South China	Aberdeen, Hong Kong Island
14:30 (UTC+8)	Souza 88' (pen.); Garrido 90'	Report	Liang Zicheng 53'; Lam Hok Hei 59'; Awal 69'	Stadium: Aberdeen Sports Ground; Attendance: 572; Referee: Liu Kwok Man

== Season statistics ==
=== Scoring ===
==== Top Scorer ====
As of 7 May 2016

Rank	Player	Club	Goals
1	(Brazil) Giovane da Silva	Eastern	10
1	(Montenegro) Admir Adrović	Pegasus	10
3	(Australia) Andrew Barisic	Eastern	7
3	Alex Akande	Kitchee	7
3	(Cameroon) Mahama Awal	South China	7
6	(France) Quentin Lendresse	Rangers	6
6	(Japan) Kenji Fukuda	Dreams Metro Gallery	6

==== Hat-tricks ====
Player	For	Against	Result	Date	Ref
(Spain) Jordi Tarrés	Kitchee	Yuen Long	4–0	12 September 2015	
(Brazil) Giovane da Silva	Eastern	Yuen Long	6–1	13 December 2015	

== Attendances ==
Pos	Team	Total	High	Low	Average	Change
1	Eastern	15,267	4,130	1,085	1,908	+98.8%
2	Kitchee	12,751	3,630	694	1,594	+6.5%
3	South China	9,105	2,292	461	1,138	−18.6%
4	Yuen Long	8,611	1,418	647	1,076	−9.6%
5	Pegasus	7,847	2,378	506	981	−39.3%
6	Dreams Metro Gallery	6,697	1,131	551	837	+10.1%
7	Wong Tai Sin	5,327	962	470	666	−4.0%
8	Southern	3,915	780	308	489	n/a^{1}
9	Rangers	3,814	966	271	477	−1.6%
	League total	73,334	4,130	271	1,019	−2.8%

Notes:
1: Team did not play last season in the Premier League

== Hong Kong Top Footballer Awards ==
Awards	Prize Winner	Club	Votes
Footballer of the Year	(Hong Kong) Yapp Hung Fai	Eastern	75.84%
Coach of the Year	(Hong Kong) Chan Yuen Ting	Eastern	50.64%
Young Players of the Year	(Hong Kong) Tan Chun Lok	Pegasus	68.01%
Young Players of the Year	(Hong Kong) Li Ngai Hoi	Kitchee	34.29%
Players' Player	(Brazil) Diego Eli	Eastern	57.97%
Most Favorite Player	(Japan) Kenji Fukuda	Dreams Metro Gallery	3,011
Hong Kong Top Footballers
Goalkeeper	(Hong Kong) Yapp Hung Fai	Eastern	75.84%
Defenders	(Hong Kong) Beto Júnior	Eastern	56.96%
Defenders	(Hong Kong) Lo Kwan Yee	Kitchee	47.23%
Defenders	(Hong Kong) Cheung Kin Fung	South China	42.17%
Defenders	(Serbia) Bojan Mališić	South China	32%
Midfielders	(Brazil) Diego Eli	Eastern	57.97%
Midfielders	(Hong Kong) Huang Yang	Kitchee	44.42%
Midfielders	(Brazil) Fernando	Kitchee	40.96%
Midfielders	(Brazil) Michel Lugo	Eastern	36.13%
Forwards	(Brazil) Giovane	Eastern	62.37%
Forwards	(Spain) Rufino	Kitchee	29.45%
