= 2015–16 Hong Kong FA Cup =

Tournament details
- Country: Hong Kong
- Teams: 12

Final positions
- Champions: Pegasus (2nd title)
- Runners-up: Yuen Long

Tournament statistics
- Matches played: 11
- Goals scored: 39 (3.55 per match)
- Attendance: 11,613 (1,056 per match)

Awards
- Best player: Fábio Lopes (Yuen Long)

The 2015–16 Hong Kong FA Cup was the 42nd season of Hong Kong FA Cup. It was a knockout competition, consisting of the preliminary round and the proper round. 42 teams from the Hong Kong First Division League, the Hong Kong Second Division League and the Hong Kong Third Division League competed in the preliminary round. The 9 teams from the Premier League and the top 3 teams from the preliminary round competed in the proper round. Pegasus won their 2nd title on 15 May 2016.

== Preliminary round ==
Teams that qualified for the proper round:

- Sun Hei
- Tai Po
- Wanchai

== Calendar ==
Stage	Round	Date
Knockout	First round	3 – 6 February 2016
Knockout	Quarter-finals	16 – 17 April 2016
Knockout	Semi-finals	30 April – 1 May 2016
Knockout	Final	15 May 2016

== Bracket ==
First round
Tai Po (2)	1
**Southern (1)**	**3**
**Pegasus (1)**	**6**
Wanchai (2)	1
Sun Hei (2)	0
**Rangers (1)**	**4**
Wong Tai Sin (1)	0
**Yuen Long (1)**	**2**

Quarter-finals
Kitchee (1)	1
**Southern (1)**	**2**
South China (1)	1
**Pegasus (1)**	**3**
Dreams Metro Gallery (1)	2
**Rangers (1)**	**5**
Eastern (1)	0
**Yuen Long (1)**	**1**

Semi-finals
Southern (1)	0
**Pegasus (1)**	**2**
Rangers (1)	1
**Yuen Long (1)**	**2**

Final
**Pegasus (1) (p)**	**1 (4)**
Yuen Long (1)	1 (3)

Bold = winner
* = after extra time, ( ) = penalty shootout score

== Fixtures and results ==
=== First round ===
3 February 2016 FA01	**Pegasus (1)**	**6–1**	Wanchai (2)	Kowloon Bay, Kowloon
20:00 UTC+8	Cheng Lai Hin 4'; Dhiego 11'; Lo Kong Wai 49'; Lee Ka Yiu 66'; Leung Kwun Chung 74'; Chan Pak Hei 80'	Report	Chao Pengfei 90'	Stadium: Kowloon Bay Park; Attendance: 259; Referee: Liu Kwok Man

4 February 2016 FA02	Tai Po (2)	**1–3**	**Southern (1)**	Kowloon Bay, Kowloon
20:00 UTC+8	Ye Jia 30'	Report	Tomas 5', 40'; Díaz 45+3'	Stadium: Kowloon Bay Park; Attendance: 331; Referee: Tang Hing Fu

5 February 2016 FA03	Sun Hei (2)	**0–4**	**Rangers (1)**	Kowloon Bay, Kowloon
20:00 UTC+8		Report	Chuck Yiu Kwok 37', 76'; Chow Cheuk Fung 50'; Cheng Siu Kwan 66'	Stadium: Kowloon Bay Park; Attendance: 267; Referee: Wong Bing Chung

6 February 2016 FA04	Wong Tai Sin (1)	**0–2**	**Yuen Long (1)**	Kowloon Bay, Kowloon
20:00 UTC+8		Report	Fábio 25'; Ranđelović 90+7'	Stadium: Kowloon Bay Park; Attendance: 267; Referee: Ng Chiu Kok

=== Quarter-finals ===
16 April 2016 FA05	Eastern (1)	**0–1**	**Yuen Long (1)**	Mong Kok, Kowloon
14:30 UTC+8		Report	Luciano 19'	Stadium: Mong Kok Stadium; Attendance: 1,209; Referee: Liu Kwok Man

16 April 2016 FA06	Dreams Metro Gallery (1)	**2–5**	**Rangers (1)**	Tsing Yi, New Territories
17:30 UTC+8	Fukuda 21'; Leonidas 90+2'	Report	Chuck Yiu Kwok 44' (pen.), 71'; Dieguito 50'; Lendresse 87'; Hui Ka Lok 89'	Stadium: Tsing Yi Sports Ground; Attendance: 215; Referee: Ho Wai Sing

17 April 2016 FA07	South China (1)	**1–3**	**Pegasus (1)**	Mong Kok, Kowloon
14:30 UTC+8	Lam Hok Hei 40'	Report	Adrović 32' (pen.); McKee 49'; Leung Kwun Chung 58'	Stadium: Mong Kok Stadium; Attendance: 1,746; Referee: Ng Chiu Kok

17 April 2016 FA08	Kitchee (1)	**1–2**	**Southern (1)**	Tsing Yi, New Territories
17:30 UTC+8	Rufino 87'	Report	Carril 36'; Luk 82'	Stadium: Tsing Yi Sports Ground; Attendance: 554; Referee: Lau Fong Hei

=== Semi-finals ===
30 April 2016 FA09	Rangers (1)	**1–2**	**Yuen Long (1)**	Mong Kok, Kowloon
15:00 UTC+8	Lendresse 50'	Report	Fábio 65'; Liu Songwei 89' (o.g.)	Stadium: Mong Kok Stadium; Attendance: 1,083; Referee: Luk Kin Sun

1 May 2016 FA10	Southern (1)	**0–2**	**Pegasus (1)**	Mong Kok, Kowloon
15:00 UTC+8		Report	Dhiego 33'; Wong Wai 87'	Stadium: Mong Kok Stadium; Attendance: 1,492; Referee: Lau Fong Hei

=== Final ===
15 May 2016 FA11	**Pegasus (1)**	**1–1** (a.e.t.) (**4–3** p)	Yuen Long (1)	So Kon Po, Hong Kong Island
15:00 UTC+8	Adrović 74'	Report	Ranđelović 67'	Stadium: Hong Kong Stadium; Attendance: 4,190; Referee: Lau Fong Hei
	**Penalties**
	Adrović (penalty scored); João Emir (penalty scored); Eduardo (penalty scored); Tan Chun Lok (penalty missed); Wong Wai (penalty scored)		(penalty scored) Ranđelović; (penalty scored) Yip Tsz Chun; (penalty scored) Luciano; (penalty missed) Yuan Yang; (penalty missed) Gustavo
