= Chan Yuen Ting =

Chinese football player and coach in Hong Kong

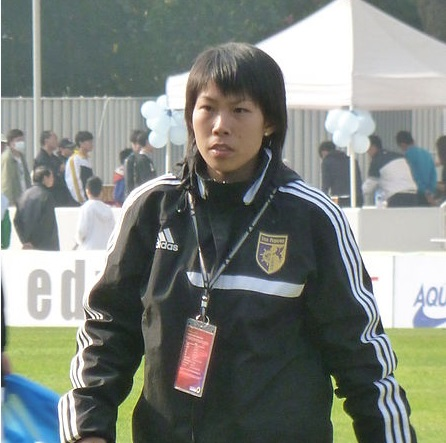
- Chan Yuen Ting (2022)

Personal information
- Full name: Chan Yuen Ting
- Date of birth: 7 October 1988 (age 38)
- Place of birth: Hong Kong
- Height: 1.60 m (5 ft 3 in)
- Positions: Defender; forward

Senior career*
Years	Team	Apps	(Gls)
2007–2013	Shatin		

International career
2008–2013	Hong Kong SAR		

Managerial career
- 2015–2017: Eastern
- 2018–2019: Eastern
- 2019–2021: China U-16
- 2021: Hainan Qiongzhong L.F.C.
- 2022–: Jiangsu L.F.C.
- 2026–: Suzhou Football Team
- * Club domestic league appearances and goals

Chan Yuen Ting (陳婉婷; born 7 October 1988) is a former football player and coach. She is the current head coach of Jiangsu L.F.C. In 2016, she became the first woman to coach a men's professional football team to the championship of a nation's top league. In 2017, she became the first woman to coach a male football club in a top-flight continental competition when she managed Eastern against Guangzhou Evergrande in a match of AFC Champions League.

Chan holds the AFC “Pro” License and AFC “Futsal Level 2” License coaching certifications.

== Career ==
In December 2015, Chan was appointed as the manager of Eastern Sports Club in the Hong Kong Premier League, replacing Yeung Ching Kwong. She was the first female manager in the league.

Chan became interested in association football through her admiration as a teenager for David Beckham. Chan graduated from the Chinese University of Hong Kong with a geography degree in 2010, and achieved a master's degree in sports science and health management during her time at Pegasus and Southern. Despite her parents' initial desire that Chan pursue a more stable career, her first position after graduating from university was as a data analyst for Hong Kong Pegasus FC (then known as TSW Pegasus FC). Prior to joining Eastern Sports Club, she worked as an assistant manager at fellow Hong Kong Premier League clubs Pegasus FC and Southern District FC. She also held coaching roles with the Hong Kong women's national association football and futsal teams, and plays at the non-professional club level for a team from Sha Tin. During her time with Pegasus FC, Chan led their under-18 team to three trophies.

Chan led Eastern to win the 2015–16 season, losing only one of the fifteen games played since Chan took over. With Eastern's victory, Chan became the first woman to coach a men's professional association football team to the championship of a nation's top league. Eastern also won the 2015–16 Hong Kong Senior Challenge Shield, only a month after Chan's appointment.

In a March 2016 interview, Chan expressed an interest in managing teams elsewhere in Asia that had more established football cultures, but also that she hopes that her success steers investment into football in Hong Kong.

In 2016, she was chosen as one of BBC's 100 Women.

In 2017, she became the first woman to coach a male football club in a top-flight continental competition when she managed Eastern against Guangzhou Evergrande in the AFC Champions League.

Chan resigned in May 2017 citing stress, failure to deliver trophies during the 2016–17 campaign and her desire to complete her AFC Pro License courses.

On 18 July 2018, Chan returned as the role of head coach of Eastern. She resigned less than seven months later on 4 February 2019, follow a run of only one win in 10 matches.

== Honours ==
=== Club ===
Coach

Eastern

- Hong Kong Premier League: 2015–16
- Hong Kong Senior Challenge Shield: 2015–16
- Hong Kong Community Cup: 2016

=== Individual ===
- Hong Kong Coach of the Year: 2016
- AFC Women's Coach of the Year: 2016
