= Park Chan-jong =

Park Chan-jong may refer to:

- Park Chan-jong (footballer)
- Park Chan-jong (politician)
