= TSW Pegasus FC–South China AA rivalry =

Football rivalry in Hong Kong

TSW Pegasus vs South China
- Location: Hong Kong
- Teams: South China, TSW Pegasus
- First meeting: TSW Pegasus 0–3 South China; 2008–09 Hong Kong First Division (5 October 2008)
- Latest meeting: Sun Pegasus 5–2 South China (14 September 2013)

Statistics
- Total meetings: 17
- Most wins: South China (8)
- Top scorer: Itaparica (5) (South China, TSW Pegasus)
- Largest victory: South China 4–0 TSW Pegasus (22 April 2012)

The rivalry between South China and TSW Pegasus is the football local derby in Hong Kong between South China and TSW Pegasus (known from 2008 to 2012 as TSW Pegasus, from 2012 to 2015 as Sun Pegasus, and from 2015 to 2020 as Hong Kong Pegasus).

== Background ==
Hong Kong Pegasus FC was founded as TSW Pegasus FC by various people from the Yuen Long District Council in 2008, with the help of South China chairman Steven Lo and his entertainment company bma, as well as his spouse Canny Leung, who was one of the members of the board. Moreover, players including Cheng Siu Wai and Deng Jinghuang joined TSW Pegasus from South China soon after the club was founded. As a result, matches between them are widely known as rivalry between South China and South China B team.

== History ==
Despite TSW Pegasus suffering a 0–3 defeat to South China in the first match between the clubs, they went on to win three times over South China in the Senior Shield, the League Cup and the Hong Kong FA Cup in the same season. However, between that season and 20 November 2011, TSW Pegasus never defeated South China. The drought was broken when they won the November match 2–1.

TSW Pegasus was renamed as Sun Pegasus for the 2012–13 season. They nearly won the away league match at Hong Kong Stadium, but Dhiego Martins' controversial goal brought South China a point.

Sun Pegasus was then renamed as Hong Kong Pegasus for the 2015–16 season.

In 2020, the club's name reverted to TSW Pegasus.

In 2021, TSW Pegasus' name was reverted to Hong Kong Pegasus.

== Results ==
=== First Division ===
South China vs TSW Pegasus

Date	Venue	Score	South China goalscorers	TSW Pegasus goalscorers	Attendance
26 March 2009	Mong Kok Stadium	0–0			1,937
28 March 2010	Siu Sai Wan Sports Ground	3–2	Schutz 64' 74' 76'	Itaparica 17', 43'	1,478
30 November 2010	Hong Kong Stadium	2–1	Butt 65', Carrijó 90'	Itaparica 52'	8,253
22 April 2012	Hong Kong Stadium	4–0	Xu Deshuai 22', Giovane 33' 41' 46'		2,037
2 February 2013	Hong Kong Stadium	1–1	Dhiego 90'	McKee 10' (pen.)	1,489

TSW Pegasus vs South China

Date	Venue	Score	TSW Pegasus goalscorers	South China goalscorers	Attendance
8 October 2008	Yuen Long Stadium	0–3^{1}	Itaparica 40', Wong Chin Hung 53', Ondoua 77'	Schutz 5', Chan Wai Ho 29'	2,537
3 January 2010	Yuen Long Stadium	2–2	Itaparica 55' 84'	Chan Siu Ki 13', Bai He 22'	3,953
22 April 2011	Yuen Long Stadium	2–3	Lee Hong Lim 38', Lai Yiu Cheong 82'	Kežman 58', Xu Deshuai 73', Cheng Lai Hin 83'	1,749
20 November 2011	Yuen Long Stadium	2–1	Carrijó 47', Itaparica 56' (pen.)	Li Haiqiang 21'	2,397
22 December 2012	Yuen Long Stadium	0–3		Kwok Kin Pong 65', Cheng Lai Hin 79', Lee Wai Lim 85'	1,616
14 September 2013	Mong Kok Stadium	5–3	Miović 18' 81', Ju Yingzhi 19', Raščić 28' 73'	Dhiego 16' 23', Barry 55' (pen.)	3,200

Remarks
^{1}South China were awarded a 3–0 win against TSW Pegasus as TSW Pegasus used more than the allowed maximum of 6 foreign players at a time on pitch in the match.

Top scorers in First Division derbies

Rank	Player	Club/s	Goals
1	(Brazil) Itaparica	South China, TSW Pegasus	5
2	(Brazil) Tales Schutz	South China	4
3	(Brazil) Giovane	South China	3
3	(Brazil) Dhiego Martins	South China	3
5	(Bosnia and Herzegovina) Admir Raščić	TSW Pegasus	2
5	(Hong Kong) Cheng Lai Hin	South China	2
5	(Serbia) Igor Miović	TSW Pegasus	2
5	(Brazil) Leandro Carrijó	South China, TSW Pegasus	2
5	(Hong Kong) Xu Deshuai	South China, TSW Pegasus	2

=== Other results ===
Date	Venue	Competition	Score	South China goalscorers	TSW Pegasus goalscorers	Attendance
7 December 2008	Mong Kok Stadium	Senior Shield	0–2		Cheng Siu Wai 41', Ondoua 90'	4,167
7 March 2009	Mong Kok Stadium	League Cup	1–2		Au Yeung Yiu Chung 19', Lee Hong Lim 45', Nakamura 56'	2,421
30 May 2009	Mong Kok Stadium	FA Cup	2–3	Chan Siu Ki 24', 81' (pen.)	Itaparica 21' (pen.), 50', Lee Hong Lim 34'	2,490
27 March 2011	Yuen Long Stadium	League Cup	2–1	Butt 11', Souza 26'	Chan Ming Kong 78'	3,623
10 December 2011	Yuen Long Stadium	Senior Shield	2–2	Chan Siu Ki 65', Au Yeung Yiu Chung 67'	Cheung Kin Fung 66', Itaparica 88'	2,092
25 December 2011	Hong Kong Stadium	Senior Shield	1–0	Joel 4'		3,972

== Honours ==
These are the major football honours of South China and TSW Pegasus.

International competitions	South China	TSW Pegasus
Intercontinental Cup	–	N/A
FIFA Club World Cup	–	–
AFC Champions League	–	–
AFC Cup	Best result: Semi-finals (2009)	Best result: Group Stage (2010)
Asian Cup Winners Cup	Best result: Runner-up (1993–94)	–
Asian Super Cup	–	N/A

National competitions	South China	TSW Pegasus
First Division	41	Best result: Runner-up (Twice)
Senior Shield	30	1
FA Cup	10	1
League Cup	3	Best result: Runner-up (3 times)
Viceroy Cup	8	N/A
Total wins	92	2
