= Jiangsu L.F.C. =

Jiangsu Women Football Club
- Full name: Jiangsu Wuxi Women Football Club
- Founded: 1998; 28 years ago
- Ground: Jiangyin Sports Centre, Wuxi, Jiangsu
- Capacity: 30,161
- Manager: Chan Yuen Ting
- League: Chinese Women's Super League
- 2025: Chinese Women's Super League, 2nd of 12
| Home colours | Away colours |

Jiangsu Women Football Club (Chinese: 江苏无锡足球俱乐部, Jiāngsū Wuxi Zúqiú Jùlèbù) is a Chinese professional football club based in Nanjing, Jiangsu. Founded in 1998, it competes in the Chinese Women's Super League, using Wutaishan Stadium as home ground. They have won two league titles.

== History ==
The team was originally founded in 1998 on the initiative of the provincial government and the provincial sports office, and enrolled in the then Chinese Women's Premier Football League managed to move from ninth place in 2001, and after being renamed the Women's Super League to fourth in 2005, the second in 2008 and winning the championship in 2009.

Between the seasons 2011 and 2014, the tournament was re-designated Women's National Football League, interrupting the promotion and relegation procedure to and from the cadet series due to the lack of available teams and players. In this period the team achieves the best result in 2012, ranking second behind the Dalian Shide champions by repeating the placements of the 2008 edition.

Over the years, the team has provided the Chinese national team with more than one player, among whom the most representative are Song Xiaoli, Zhang Yanru, Weng Xinzhi, Zhou Gaoping and Ma Jun.

In 2015, the Chinese Football Association decided to relaunch the tournament, returning to the Women's Super League designation by reconstituting a second affiliated division, the CWFL.

In March 2016, Suning Commerce Group announced that it had acquired ownership of the team making it the women's section of Jiangsu Suning F.C.

As part of improving its staff, the management of the company convinces Norwegian international Isabell Herlovsen as well as four-time champion of Norway with LSK Kvinner and top scorer of 2016 Toppserien, to move to Jiangsu Suning, joining the other foreigner of the team, the Brazilian Gabi Zanotti, an operation that proves to be positive by winning third place at the end of the 2017 season. the 2018 season enters into a contract with Malawian international Tabitha Chawinga taken this time from the Damallsvenskan and which despite being graduated top scorer of the 2017 Damallsvenskan with 26 goals to his credit, she couldn't avoid the relegation of Kvarnsvedens. With the new arrival, the company makes a further leap in quality, with Chawinga at the top of the ranking of the scorers already in the middle of the championship. She was later joined by Ghanaian international Elizabeth Addo in 2019. The duo helped Jiangsu quadruple during the 2019 season. At the end of the season, the club were also runners-up in the maiden 2019 AFC Women's Club Championship.

On 28 February 2021, the parent company Suning Holdings Group announced that operations were going to cease immediately alongside the men and youth teams. The ownership of the Ladies Football Club was returned to the Administration of Sport of Jiangsu, but the club did not have enough time to register for the 2021 National Championship.

On 8 March 2022, the team announced that Chan Yuen Ting, the first woman to coach a men's professional football team to the championship of a nation's top league, will be the team's new coach.

== Stadium ==
Jiangsu Suning played their home matches at Wutaishan Stadium. Following the return to Administration of Sport of Jiangsu the team played home matches at their training base, Jiangning Football Training Base. For the 2025 season the team will be hosting home matches at Jiangyin Sports Centre.

== Coaching staff ==
| Position | Name |
|---|---|
| Head coach | (Hong Kong) Chan Yuen Ting |
| Assistant coaches | (China) Ni Naixing |
| Assistant coaches | (China) Yu Weimin |
| Assistant coaches | (England) David Webber |
| Goalkeeping coach | (Scotland) Andrew McNeil |
| Conditioning coach | (Hong Kong) Cao Guorong |
| Video analyst | (China) Hu Luming |
| Translator | (China) Hong Yizhou |
| Physios | (China) Li Zhengguo |
| Physios | (China) Zhang Tianyu |

== Players ==
=== Current squad ===
As of 7 March 2025

Note: Flags indicate national team as defined under FIFA eligibility rules; some limited exceptions apply. Players may hold more than one non-FIFA nationality.

| No. | Pos. | Nation | Player |
|---|---|---|---|
| 1 | GK | CHN | Liu Feifei |
| 2 | DF | CHN | Li Lanlan |
| 3 | DF | CHN | Dou Jiaxing |
| 4 | DF | CHN | Shao Zijia |
| 5 | DF | CHN | Yang Xi |
| 6 | DF | CHN | Li Yuehua |
| 7 | MF | CHN | Ou Yiyao |
| 8 | MF | CHN | Han Xuan |
| 10 | MF | CHN | Long Xintong |
| 11 | FW | CHN | Gong Li |
| 12 | MF | CHN | Huo Yuexin |
| 13 | FW | CHN | Jin Kun |
| 14 | MF | CHN | Han Mengting |
| 15 | MF | CHN | Chen Jiayu |
| 16 | DF | CHN | Zhai Qingwei |
| 17 | FW | CHN | Huang Qinyi |
| 18 | FW | CHN | Ni Mengjie |
| 19 | GK | CHN | Xu Huan |

| No. | Pos. | Nation | Player |
|---|---|---|---|
| 20 | FW | CHN | Shao Ziqin |
| 21 | DF | CHN | Yan Xiaoyu |
| 22 | GK | CHN | Guo Xinyu |
| 23 | GK | CHN | Hu Yongle |
| 24 | DF | CHN | Xue Jiapei |
| 25 | FW | NGA | Roosa Ariyo |
| 27 | DF | CHN | Qiao Ruiqi |
| 28 | MF | CHN | Wan Weijing |
| 29 | FW | CHN | Yang Li |
| 30 | MF | CHN | Wu Yejia |
| 31 | MF | CHN | Sun Xin |
| 32 | FW | CHN | Yu Jiaqi |
| 33 | MF | CHN | Ren Qinger |
| 34 | DF | CHN | Liu Ling |
| 36 | MF | CHN | Lu Zhilin |
| 49 | GK | CHN | Hao Yixin |
| 50 | MF | CHN | Chen Yuqi |

== Honours ==
- National Games of China
  - Champions (2): 2013, 2025
- Chinese Women's Super League
  - Champions (2): 2009, 2019
- Chinese National Women's Football Championship (全国女子足球锦标赛)
  - Champions (3): 2018, 2019, 2024
- Chinese Women's Football Association Cup (中国女子足协杯)
  - Champions (3): 2017, 2018, 2019
- Chinese Women's Super Cup (中国女子超级杯)
  - Champions (1): 2019

== Record in AFC Women's Club Championship ==
All results (home, away and aggregate) list Jiangsu's goal tally first.

| Season | Round | Opponents | Home | Away | Aggregate |
|---|---|---|---|---|---|
| 2019 | Group stage | (Japan) Nippon TV Beleza | — | 1–1 | 2nd place |
| 2019 | Group stage | (Australia) Melbourne Victory | — | 1–1 | 2nd place |
| 2019 | Group stage | (South Korea) Incheon Hyundai Steel Red Angels | — | 2–0 | 2nd place |

== See also ==
- Jiangsu F.C.
