= Admir Adrović =

Montenegrin footballer

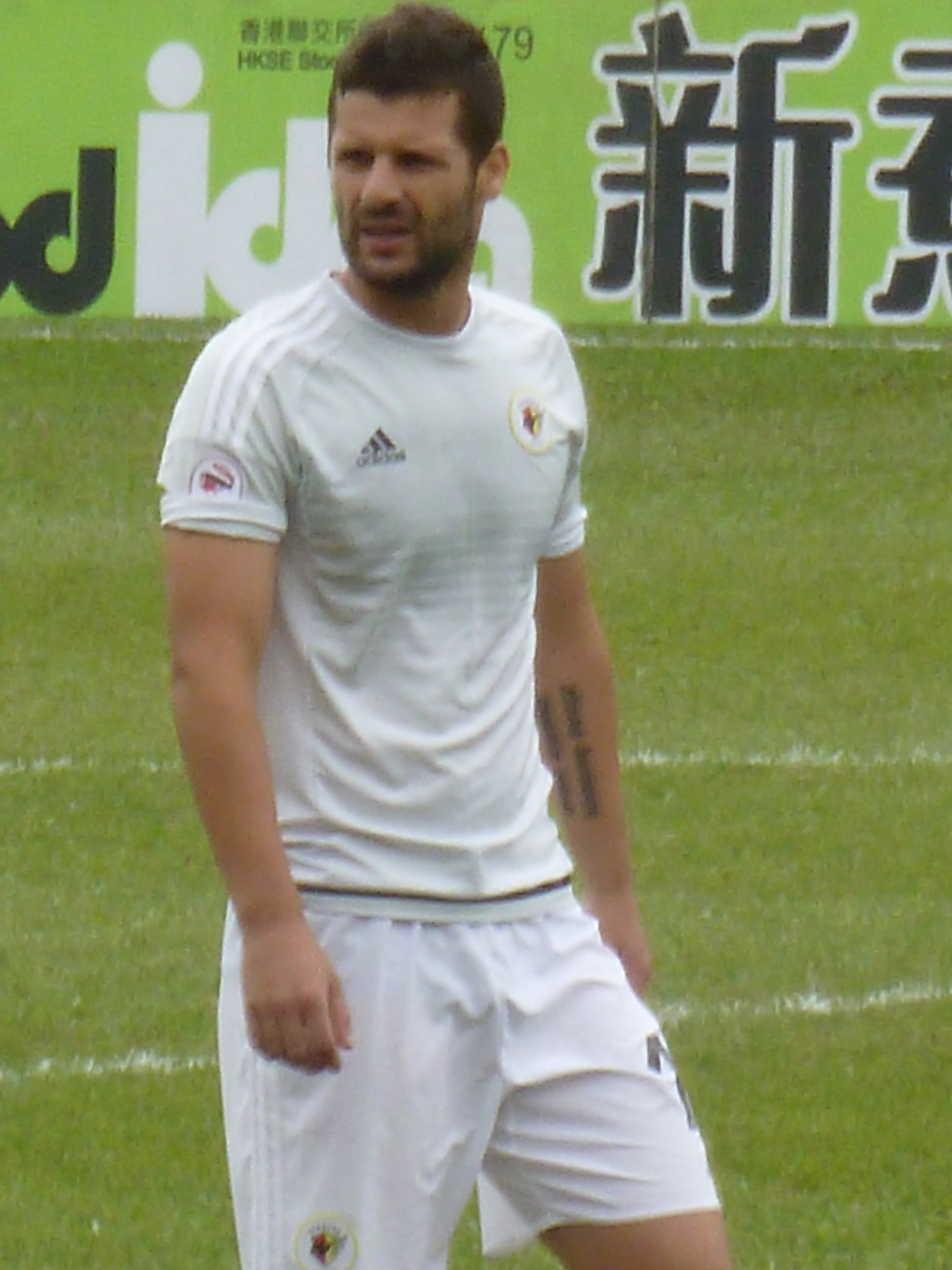

Personal information
- Full name: Admir Adrović
- Date of birth: 8 May 1988 (age 38)
- Place of birth: Ivangrad, SR Montenegro, SFR Yugoslavia
- Height: 1.88 m (6 ft 2 in)
- Position: Forward

Team information
- Current team: FK Podgorica

Youth career
- 2002–2005: Berane

Senior career*
Years	Team	Apps	(Gls)
2005–2007	Berane	27	(3)
2007–2010	Sutjeska Nikšić	87	(25)
2010–2011	→ Damash (loan)	5	(1)
2011–2013	Budućnost	58	(37)
2013–2014	Pandurii	5	(0)
2014	Budućnost	17	(11)
2014–2015	Al-Muharraq		
2015–2016	Pegasus	15	(10)
2016	Mladost Podgorica	12	(6)
2017	Sukhothai	16	(7)
2017–2018	Mladost Podgorica	35	(13)
2018	Dalian Transcendence	8	(0)
2019	Muscat Club		
2019–2020	Oman Club		
2020	OFK Titograd	12	(4)
2020–2021	Sutjeska Nikšić	16	(1)
2021–2021	Dečić Tuzi	3	(0)
2021–	FK Podgorica	0	(0)

International career
2008–2010	Montenegro U21	9	(1)
- * Club domestic league appearances and goals as of 19:20, 3 March 2021 (UTC)

Admir Adrović (Montenegrin Cyrillic: Адмир Адровић; born 8 May 1988) is a Montenegrin professional footballer who plays as a forward for FK Podgorica.

== Club career ==
He started his career at FK Berane, breaking into the first-team in 2005. In 2007, he joined Sutjeska Nikšić. After a loan spell at S.C. Damash he joined FK Budućnost Podgorica on a free transfer. During his time at Budućnost, he lifted Montenegrin First League in 2012 and Montenegrin Cup in 2013. He also became league's top scorer two consecutive seasons. Budućnost rejected loan offers from UD Las Palmas and Córdoba CF so he joined Pandurii in 2013. He scored his first goal for Pandurii in a 3–0 win against FC Ripensia Timișoara. He rejoined Budućnost in 2014.

After a season with Al-Muharraq, he joined Hong Kong Premier League side Pegasus.

On 29 June 2018, Adrović joined China League One club Dalian Transcendence on a half year contract.

== Honours and achievements ==
=== Club ===
- Hong Kong FA Cup
  - Winners: 2015-16
- Montenegrin Cup
  - Winners: 2017–18

=== Individual ===
- Montenegrin First League top goalscorer: 2011–12, 2012–13
- Hong Kong Premier League top goalscorer: 2015–16
