= Liu Pui Fung =

Hong Kong footballer

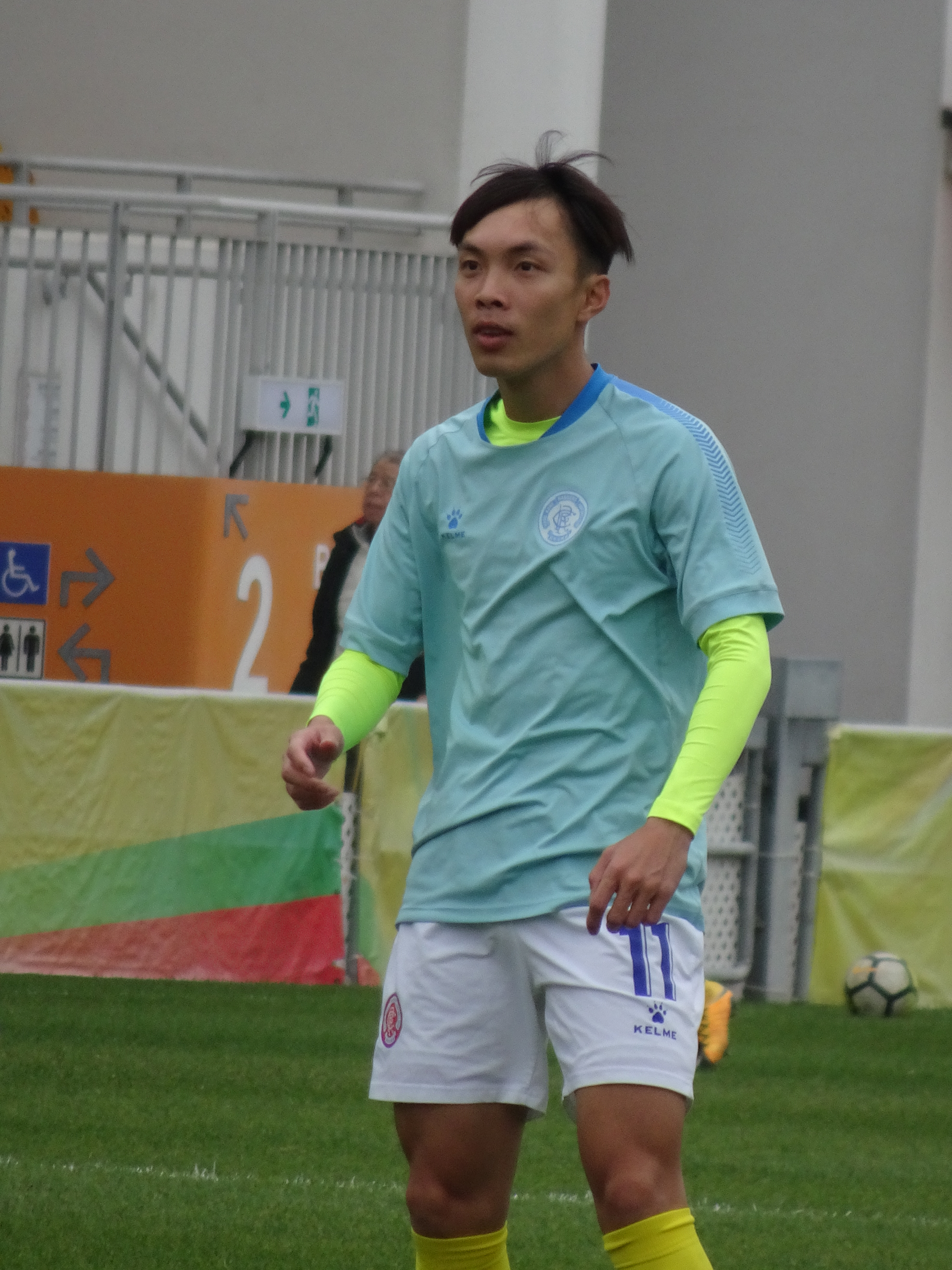

Personal information
- Full name: Liu Pui Fung
- Date of birth: 21 August 1991 (age 35)
- Place of birth: Hong Kong
- Height: 1.71 m (5 ft 7 in)
- Position: Right winger

Senior career*
Years	Team	Apps	(Gls)
2008	Tai Chung		
2008–2016	Wong Tai Sin	32	(5)
2016–2017	Biu Chun Glory Sky	18	(0)
2017–2018	Hong Kong Rangers	10	(0)
2018	Dreams FC	7	(0)
2018	Pegasus	7	(3)
2019–2020	Eastern District	6	(1)
2020–2025	King Mountain	67	(19)
2025–	Ravia		
- * Club domestic league appearances and goals as of 30 June 2020

Liu Pui Fung (Chinese: 廖培楓, born 21 August 1991) is a former Hong Kong professional footballer who played as a Right winger.

== Club career ==
In 2008, Liu joined Hong Kong Third Division club Wong Tai Sin.

On 28 November 2015, Liu scored his first goal in 2015–16 Hong Kong Premier League against Pegasus, which ended 2-2.

On 31 January 2018, Dreams FC announced that they had acquired Liu from Rangers (HKG).

On 2 July 2018, Liu left Dreams FC for Pegasus on a free transfer. After appearing in seven matches for Pegasus, Liu announced his retirement on 8 December in order to transition into a career with the Disciplined Services.
