= Xu Huan =

Chinese footballer (born 1999)

Xu Huan 徐欢
Personal information
- Full name: Xu Huan
- Date of birth: 6 March 1999 (age 27)
- Place of birth: China
- Height: 1.80 m (5 ft 11 in)
- Position: Goalkeeper

Team information
- Current team: Jiangsu
- Number: 19

Senior career*
Years	Team	Apps	(Gls)
-2019	Beijing BG Phoenix		(0)
2020–	Jiangsu	25	(0)

International career^{‡}
2019–	China	5	(0)
- * Club domestic league appearances and goals ‡ National team caps and goals as of 30 July 2023

Xu Huan (Chinese: 徐欢; pinyin: Xú Huān, born 6 March 1999) is a Chinese footballer who plays as a goalkeeper for Jiangsu and the China women's national football team.

== International career ==
Xu was first-choice goalkeeper for China at the 2018 FIFA U-20 Women's World Cup.

== Honours ==
China

- AFC Women's Asian Cup: 2022
