= Kohei Ito =

Japanese association football player

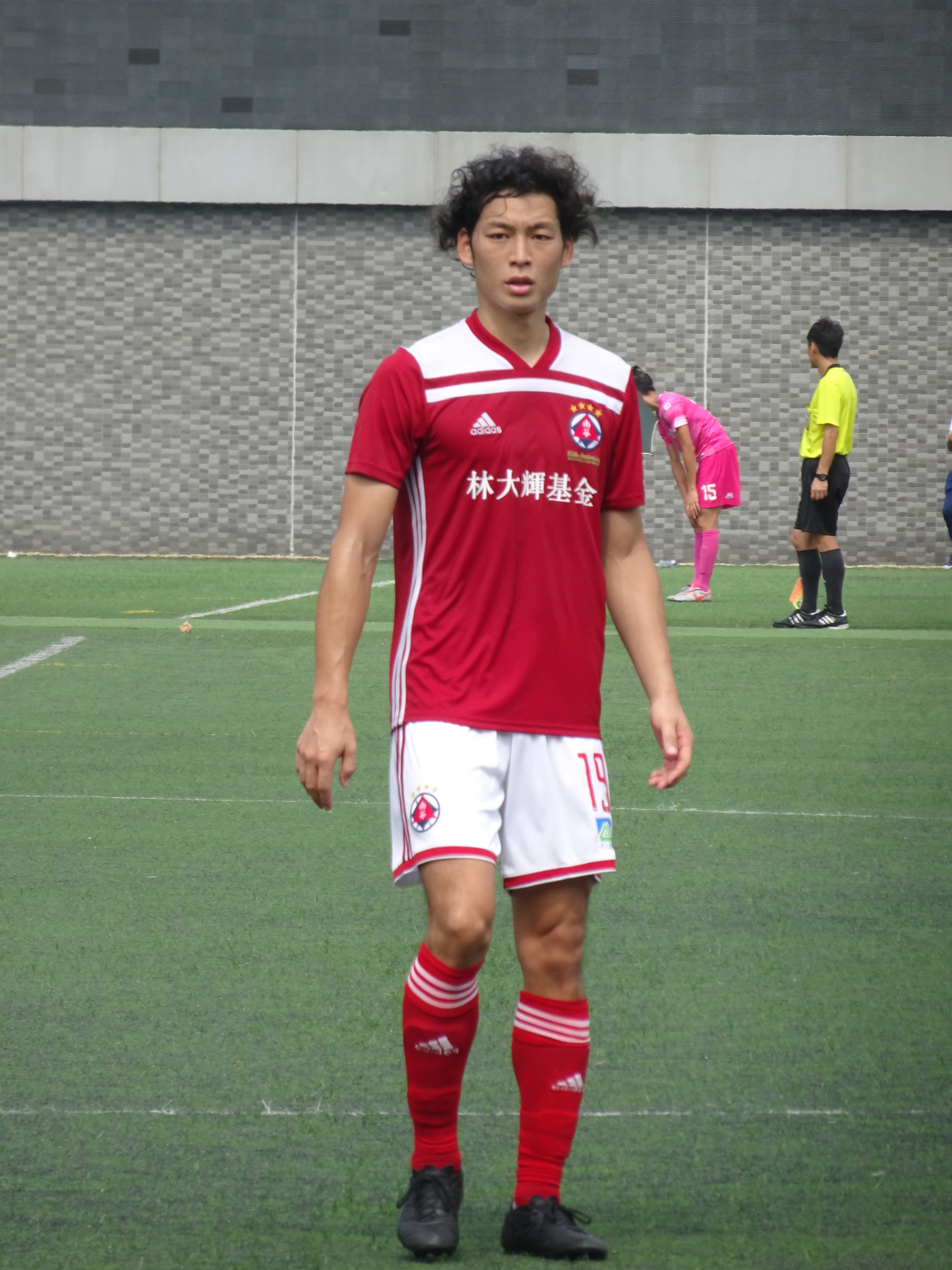
- Ito with South China in 2019

Personal information
- Full name: Kohei Ito
- Date of birth: 5 December 1988 (age 37)
- Place of birth: Sakata, Yamagata Prefecture, Japan
- Height: 1.78 m (5 ft 10 in)
- Position: Centre back

Team information
- Current team: South China

Youth career
- 2008–2009: Saitama SC

Senior career*
Years	Team	Apps	(Gls)
2010–2015	Sakata Takutomo		
2015–2016	Wong Tai Sin	7	(1)
2016–2017	Dreams	0	(0)
2017	Lampang		
2019–	South China	33	(8)
- * Club domestic league appearances and goals as of 08:37, 14 June 2021 (UTC)

Kohei Ito (伊藤 紘平, Ito Kohei; born 5 December 1988) is a Japanese footballer who currently plays as a centre back for Hong Kong First Division club South China.

== Career statistics ==
=== Club ===
As of 21 March 2020.

Club	Season	League			National Cup		League Cup		Other		Total	
Club	Season	Division	Apps	Goals	Apps	Goals	Apps	Goals	Apps	Goals	Apps	Goals
Wong Tai Sin	2015–16	Hong Kong Premier League	7	1	1 (Note: Appearances in the Hong Kong FA Cup)	0	3 (Note: Appearances in the HKFA League Cup)	0	1 (Note: Appearances in the Hong Kong Challenge Shield)	0	12	1
South China	2018–19	Hong Kong First Division	10	1	0	0	0	0	0	0	10	1
South China	2019–20	Hong Kong First Division	12	3	0	0	0	0	0	0	12	3
South China	Total		22	4	0	0	0	0	0	0	22	4
Career total			29	5	1	0	3	0	1	0	33	5
