= Yeung Ching Kwong =

Hong Kong footballer and coach (born 1976)

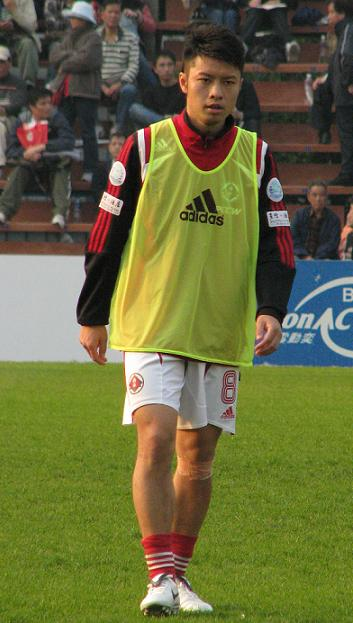

Personal information
- Full name: Yeung Ching Kwong
- Date of birth: 7 May 1976 (age 50)
- Place of birth: Hong Kong
- Height: 1.72 m (5 ft 8 in)
- Position: Centre midfielder

Senior career*
Years	Team	Apps	(Gls)
1993–1994	Kitchee		
1994–1995	Kui Tan		
1995–1997	Eastern		
1997–2009	South China	52	(10)
2008–2009	→ Pegasus (loan)	7	(0)
2009	→ Eastern (loan)	5	(1)
2009–2011	Pegasus	0	(0)
2012–2013	Yuen Long	19	(3)

International career^{‡}
2001–2010	Hong Kong	7	(0)

Managerial career
- 2009–2012: Pegasus (player-coach)
- 2012–2015: South China (assistant coach)
- 2015: Eastern
- 2015–2017: Meizhou Hakka (assistant coach)
- 2017: Pegasus (assistant coach)
- 2017–2018: Pegasus
- 2018–2020: R&F
- 2021: Meizhou Hakka (assistant coach)
- 2022–2023: Kitchee (youth coach)
- 2023–2025: Southern
- 2026–: Kitchee (assistant coach)
- * Club domestic league appearances and goals as of 6 June 2023 ‡ National team caps and goals as of 24 February 2008

Yeung Ching Kwong (Chinese: 楊正光; Jyutping: joeng^{4} zing^{3} gwong^{1}, born 7 May 1976) is a Hong Kong football coach and a former professional footballer who played as a midfielder He is currently the. coach of Hong Kong Premier League club Kitchee.

== Managerial career ==
Yeung worked previously as an assistant with Pegasus and South China.

In 2015, Yeung served as head coach of Eastern before resigning on 8 December 2015 to become an assistant coach with Meizhou Hakka. His successor, Chan Yuen Ting, led Eastern to the 2015–16 Hong Kong Premier League title and became the first woman to lead a men's professional side to a league title.

On 31 March 2017, Pegasus announced via Facebook that Yeung had returned to the club to become an assistant coach under manager Kevin Bond. Following Bond's departure to join Harry Redknapp's coaching staff at Birmingham City, Yeung was promoted to be the head coach in June 2017.

On 14 June 2018, Yeung was announced as the head coach of Hong Kong Premier League side R&F. On 19 May 2019, Yeung disclosed to the media that he had renewed his contract for a further two years. On 14 October 2020, he left the club after his club announced its withdrawal from HKPL in the new season.

In February 2021, Yeung became the assistant coach of Meizhou Hakka.

On 18 March 2022, Yeung returned to Hong Kong and joined Kitchee as a youth coach.

On 6 June 2023, Yeung was announced as the head coach of Southern.

== Career statistics ==
=== Club ===
As of 1 February 2009.

Club performance			League		Cup		League Cup		Continental		Total	
Season	Club	League	Apps	Goals	Apps	Goals	Apps	Goals	Apps	Goals	Apps	Goals
Hong Kong			League		FA Cup & Shield		League Cup		Asia		Total	
2005–06	South China	First Division	7	2	2	0	0	0	-		9	2
2006–07	South China	First Division	9	1	3	1	1	0	-		13	2
2007–08	South China	First Division	5	0	1	0	2	0	6	0	14	0
2008–09	Pegasus	First Division	4 (3)	0	0 (2)	0	-		-		4 (3)	0
2008–09	Eastern	First Division	5 (0)	1	1 (0)	0	1 (0)	0	4 (0)	0	11 (0)	1
200–10	Pegasus	First Division	0 (0)	0	0 (0)	0	0 (0)	0	-		0 (0)	0
Total	Hong Kong		?	?	?	?	?	?	?	?	?	?
