= Gee Kyung-hun =

South Korean footballer

Gee Kyung-hun 지경훈
Personal information
- Full name: Gee Kyung-hun
- Date of birth: 5 June 1990 (age 36)
- Place of birth: Seoul, South Korea
- Height: 1.84 m (6 ft 1/2 in)
- Positions: Defensive midfielder; central defender

Senior career*
| Years | Team | Apps | (Gls) |
| 2013–2014 | Charleston Battery | 21 | (0) |
| 2014–2015 | Kitsap Pumas | 3 | (0) |
| 2015–2017 | Hong Kong Rangers | 19 | (0) |
- * Club domestic league appearances and goals as of 6 May 2017

- Gee Kyung-hun
- Hangul: 지경훈
- Hanja: 池慶訓
- RR: Ji Gyeonghun
- MR: Chi Kyŏnghun

Gee Kyung-hun (Korean: 지경훈; Hanja: 池慶訓; born 5 June 1990 in Seoul) is a South Korean footballer who is currently a free agent.

He is a versatile midfielder and can play as a defensive midfielder or a central defender.

== Club career ==
Gee spent two seasons between 2015 and 2017 at Hong Kong Premier League club Hong Kong Rangers.
