= Leônidas (footballer, born 1995) =

Brazilian footballer

Leonidas
Personal information
- Full name: Leônidas Soares Damasceno
- Date of birth: 17 October 1995 (age 31)
- Place of birth: Pelotas, Rio Grande do Sul, Brazil
- Height: 1.78 m (5 ft 10 in)
- Position: Midfielder

Team information
- Current team: Valadares Gala

Youth career
- 2011–2014: Fluminense
- 2014–2015: Goiás

Senior career*
Years	Team	Apps	(Gls)
2015–2016	Hong Kong Pegasus	4	(0)
2016	→ Dreams Metro Gallery (loan)	9	(2)
2016–2017	Villa Nova	4	(0)
2017–2018	Zorya Luhansk	1	(0)
2018–2019	Olimpik Donetsk	9	(0)
2019	Villa Nova	1	(0)
2019	Passo Fundo	0	(0)
2019–2020	Espinho	9	(1)
2020–	Valadares Gala	7	(0)
- * Club domestic league appearances and goals as of 07:21, 1 March 2020 (UTC)

Leônidas Soares Damasceno (born 17 October 1995), commonly known as Leonidas, is a Brazilian football midfielder who plays for Valadares Gala.

== Career ==
Leonidas is a product of Fluminense FC and Goiás Esporte Clube youth sportive systems. During 2015–2016 he played in the Hong Kong Premier League, but in January 2017 returned to Brazil and signed contract with Villa Nova Atlético Clube.

In May 2017 he signed a two-year deal with Ukrainian Premier League club FC Zorya Luhansk.

On 16 February 2018, Leonidas transferred to Olimpik Donetsk and signed two year deal with Ukrainian Premier League club. on 9 July 2018 he left Olimpik after the contract was terminated in mutual consent.
