= Luiz Carlos (footballer, born 1982) =

Brazilian footballer

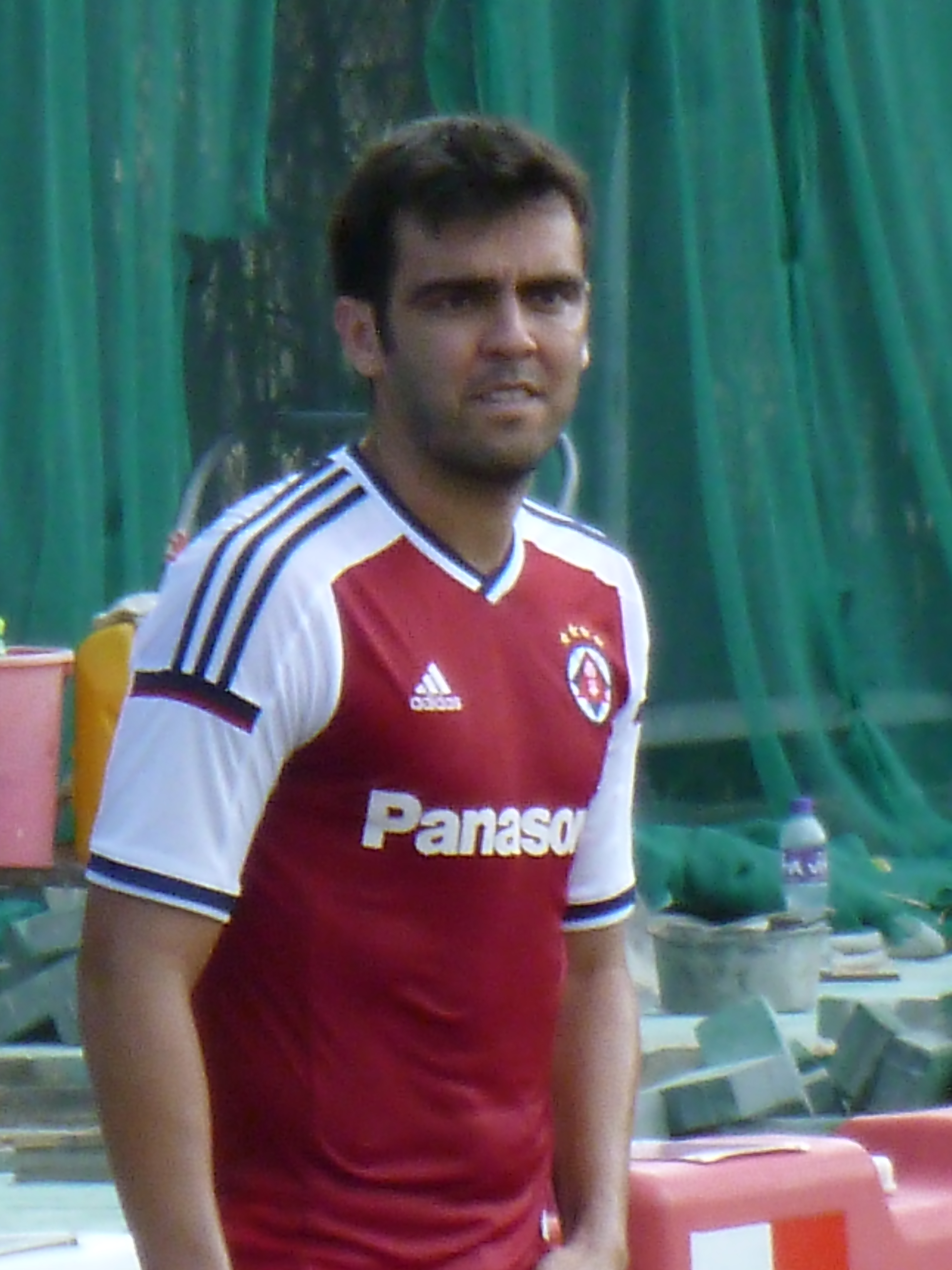

Personal information
- Full name: Luiz Carlos Vieira Junior
- Date of birth: July 27, 1982 (age 44)
- Place of birth: São Leopoldo, Brazil
- Height: 1.85 m (6 ft 1 in)
- Position: Midfielder

Team information
- Current team: São Luiz
- Number: 10

Youth career
- 1998–2003: Internacional

Senior career*
Years	Team	Apps	(Gls)
2003–2006	Noroeste		
2006–2007	Sampaio Corrêa		
2007–2008	Al Naser		
2008–2010	Club Blooming		(21)
2011–2012	San José	54	(9)
2012–2013	Novo Hamburgo	5	(0)
2013–2014	Glória		
2014	Boavista	6	(0)
2014–2015	Glória		
2015–2017	South China	22	(5)
2017–	São Luiz	13	(0)
- * Club domestic league appearances and goals as of 29 January 2018

Luiz Carlos Vieira Junior (born July 27, 1982) is a Brazilian footballer who plays as a midfielder for São Luiz.
