= Park Chan-jong (footballer) =

South Korean footballer

Park Chan-jong 박찬종
Personal information
- Full name: Park Chan-jong
- Date of birth: 2 September 1989 (age 37)
- Place of birth: Ulsan, South Korea
- Height: 1.82 m (5 ft 11 1/2 in)
- Positions: Attacking midfielder; winger

Youth career
- 2009–2010: Jeonju University

Senior career*
Years	Team	Apps	(Gls)
2010–2011	HNŠK Moslavina		
2011	Croatia Sesvete		
2012	GOŠK Gabela	5	(0)
2015–2016	Yuen Long	7	(3)
- * Club domestic league appearances and goals as of 22 September 2016

- Park Chan-jong
- Hangul: 박찬종
- Hanja: 朴燦鍾
- RR: Bak Chanjong
- MR: Pak Ch'anjong

Park Chan-jong (Korean: 박찬종; born 2 September 1989 in Ulsan) is a South Korean footballer who last played for Hong Kong Premier League club Yuen Long.

He is a versatile midfielder and can play as attacking midfielder or winger.
