= Quentin Lendresse =

French footballer (born 1990)

Personal information
- Full name: Quentin Jean Henri Lendresse
- Date of birth: 6 March 1990 (age 36)
- Place of birth: Neuilly-sur-Seine, Paris, France
- Height: 1.70 m (5 ft 7 in)
- Positions: Attacking midfielder; forward

Youth career
- 2004–2010: Saint-Étienne

Senior career*
Years	Team	Apps	(Gls)
2010–2011	Aurillac Arpajon	19	(0)
2011–2012	Oeste	38	(0)
2015–2017	Hong Kong Rangers	15	(6)
- * Club domestic league appearances and goals as of 7 May 2016

Quentin Jean Henri Lendresse (Chinese: 連卓思; born 6 March 1990) is a former French professional footballer. He is a versatile midfielder and can play as attacking midfielder or forward.
