= Canny Leung =

Hong Kong songwriter and author (born 1968)

- 梁芷珊
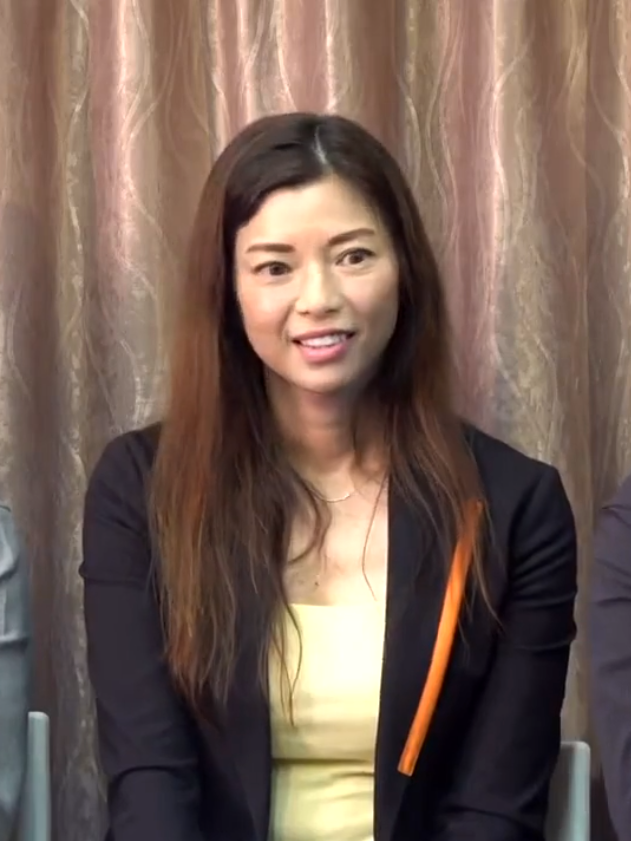
- Leung in 2020
- Born: 29 June 1968 (age 58); British Hong Kong
- Education: Belilios Public School, Hong Kong Polytechnic University
- Years active: 1990–present
- Spouse: Steven Lo (2002-2018)

Canny Leung Chi-Shan
- Chinese: 梁芷珊
Transcriptions
Standard Mandarin
- Hanyu Pinyin: Liáng Zhǐshān
Yue: Cantonese
- Jyutping: loeng4 zi2 saan1

Canny Leung Chi-Shan (Chinese: 梁芷珊; born 29 June 1968) is a Hong Kong songwriter and author.

== Biography ==
Leung is a graduate of the Hong Kong Polytechnic University.

== Career ==
Leung was a model, an actor in television commercials, and an emcee on television and radio programs. She also performed at The Justice of Life a Hong Kong classic television drama, starring alongside Stephen Chow Sing-chi and Anthony Wong Chau-sang. She is a songwriter, providing lyrics for musicians such as Andy Hui, Sammi Cheng, and Kelly Chen. She has published literary works in newspapers and magazines, including Apple Daily, Oriental Daily, The Sun, Ming Pao, Hong Kong Economic Times, Hong Kong Economic Journal, Cosmopolitan and Elle. Certain of her fiction works have been adapted into film, television, and radio dramas.

== Community engagement ==
Leung founded the Hong Kong Pegasus, formerly named Tin Shui Wai Pegasus Football Club in 2008, for community building and improving the new town's reputation at Tin Shui Wai. At its initial season, Pegasus won the champions at the Hong Kong Senior Shield. The organization has been supported by brands such as Sony PlayStation. She became chairman in 2015. Former players include Lee Ka Yiu, Tan Chun Lok, Lo Kong Wai, Leung Kwun Chung, and Leung Nok Hang of the Hong Kong national football team.

== Personal life ==
Leung's husband was Steven Lo, They divorced in 2018.

== See also ==
- Military Attack (race horse)
