= Luciano (footballer, born 1987) =

Brazilian footballer

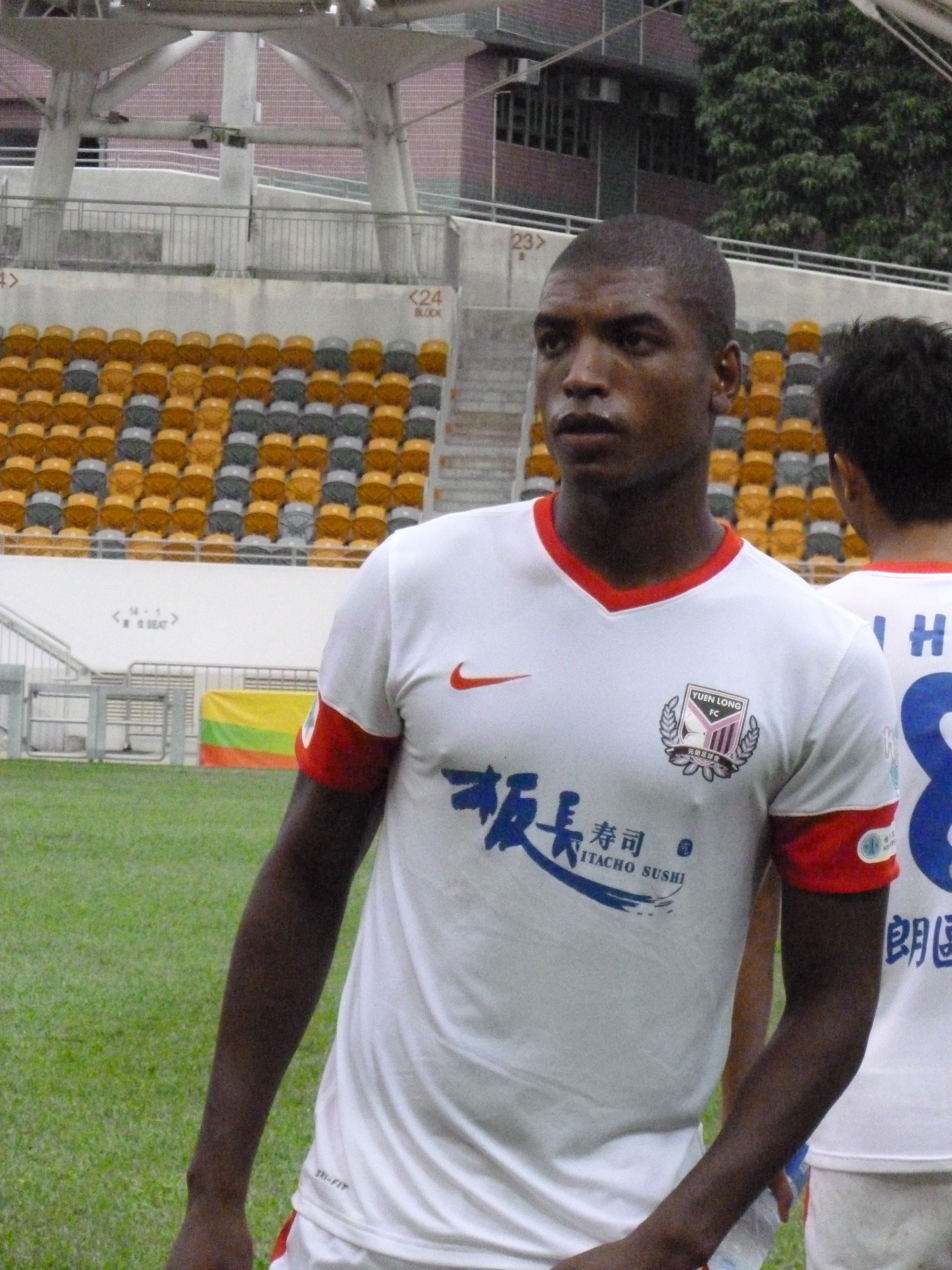

Personal information
- Full name: Luciano Silva da Silva
- Date of birth: 13 June 1987 (age 39)
- Place of birth: São Paulo, Brazil
- Height: 1.86 m (6 ft 1 in)
- Position: Centre back

Youth career
- 1997–2005: Internacional

Senior career*
Years	Team	Apps	(Gls)
2005–2008	Internacional	1	(0)
2008–2009	Bragantino	0	(0)
2009–2010	Brasil de Pelotas	4	(0)
2010–2011	Taquaritinga	18	(0)
2011–2012	América–SP	12	(0)
2012–2013	An Giang	26	(0)
2013–2014	Rangers (HKG)	26	(2)
2015	Brasil de Farroupilha	10	(4)
2015–2017	Yuen Long	36	(3)
2017–2018	Lee Man	18	(0)
2019–2021	Happy Valley	30	(4)
2021–2022	Southern	4	(1)
2022–	Central & Western	40	(5)
- * Club domestic league appearances and goals as of 4 February 2024

Luciano Silva da Silva (Chinese: 盧斯安奴; born 13 June 1987), simply known as Luciano, is a Brazilian professional footballer who played as a centre back.

== Club career ==
After playing for several clubs in the lower leagues of Brazilian football, Silva signed for Rangers in the Hong Kong First Division in 2013 from Vietnamese club An Giang. He made his debut for the club in a 1–2 away win against Kitchee. He scored his first goal against Yokohama FC Hong Kong.

On 3 July 2017, it was revealed that Lee Man had added Luciano ahead of the 2017-18 season.

On 9 August 2019, after being a free agent for a year, Luciano signed for another Hong Kong Premier League club Happy Valley. On 2 June 2020, the club announced that his contract had been renewed for the following season.

On 1 July 2021, Luciano joined Southern. On 17 July 2022, he left the club.

== Match-fixing scandal ==
On 15 February 2024, Luciano was charged by ICAC for match-fixing. He was convicted along with footballer Brian Fok and a bookmaker on 8 May 2026 for one count of conspiracy to cheat at gambling.

On 29 May 2026, Luciano was sentenced to 14 months and four weeks imprisonment.
