= Yuen Long Stadium =

Stadium in New Territories, Hong Kong

- 大披頭; Tai Pei Tou
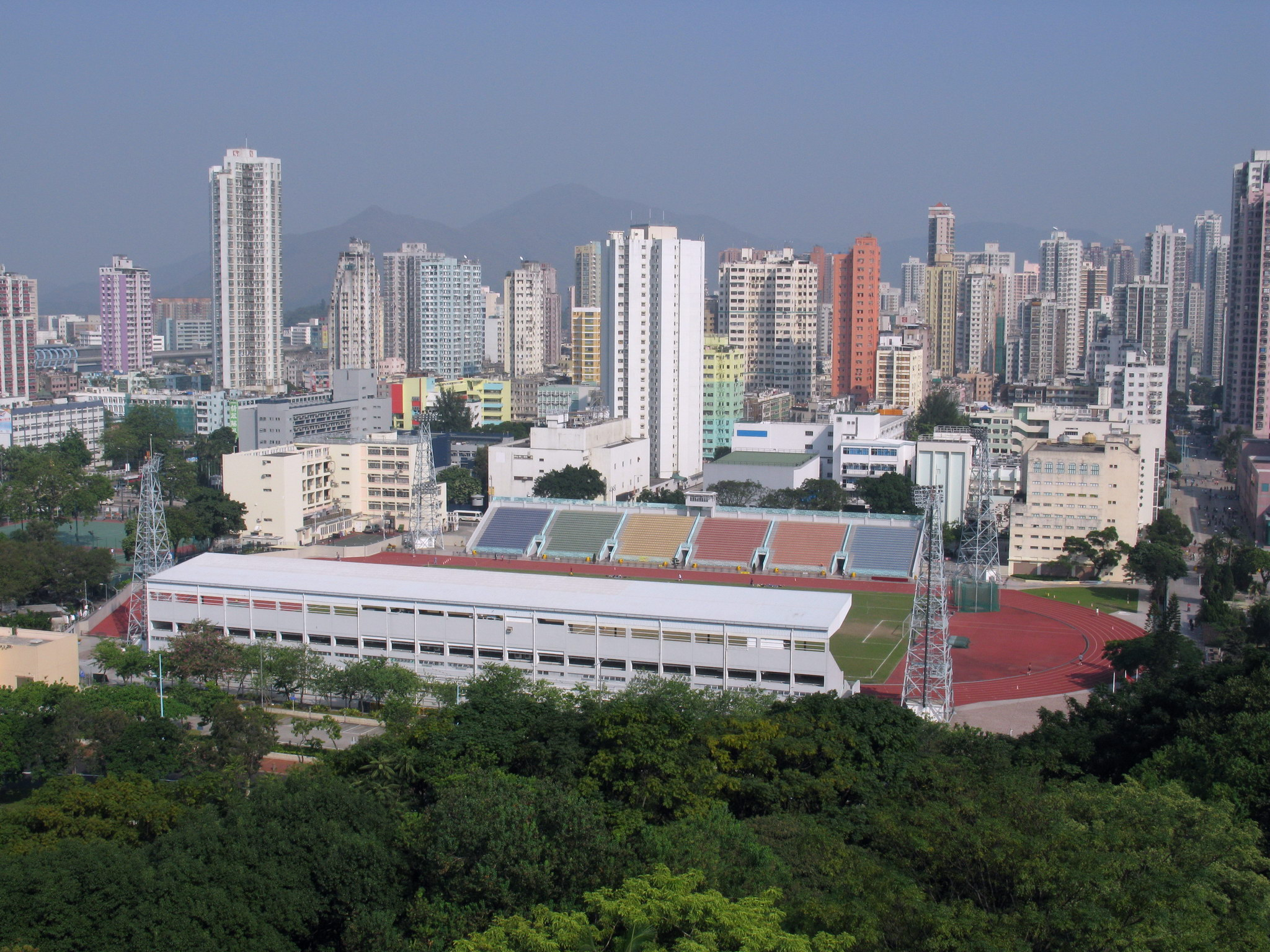
- Aerial view of the stadium
- Interactive map of Yuen Long Stadium
- Address: 6 Tai Yuk Road, Yuen Long, Hong Kong
- Coordinates: 22.4428°N 114.0211°E
- Owner: Hong Kong Government
- Operator: Leisure and Cultural Services Department
- Capacity: 4,932
- Surface: Grass
- Field size: 100 x 64 metres (109 x 70 yards)
- Public transit: Long Ping station Shui Pin Wai

Construction
- Groundbreaking: 1965; 61 years ago
- Opened: 15 December 1969; 56 years ago
- Renovated: 1989, 2008, 2022
- Cost: HK$198,000
- Architect: Yuen Long Cheong Kee Construction

Tenants
- Yuen Long (2013–2020); TSW Pegasus (2009–2013, 2020–2021)

Yuen Long Stadium (Chinese: 元朗大球場) is a multi-purpose stadium in Yuen Long, New Territories, Hong Kong. The stadium is currently closed for renovations.

== History ==
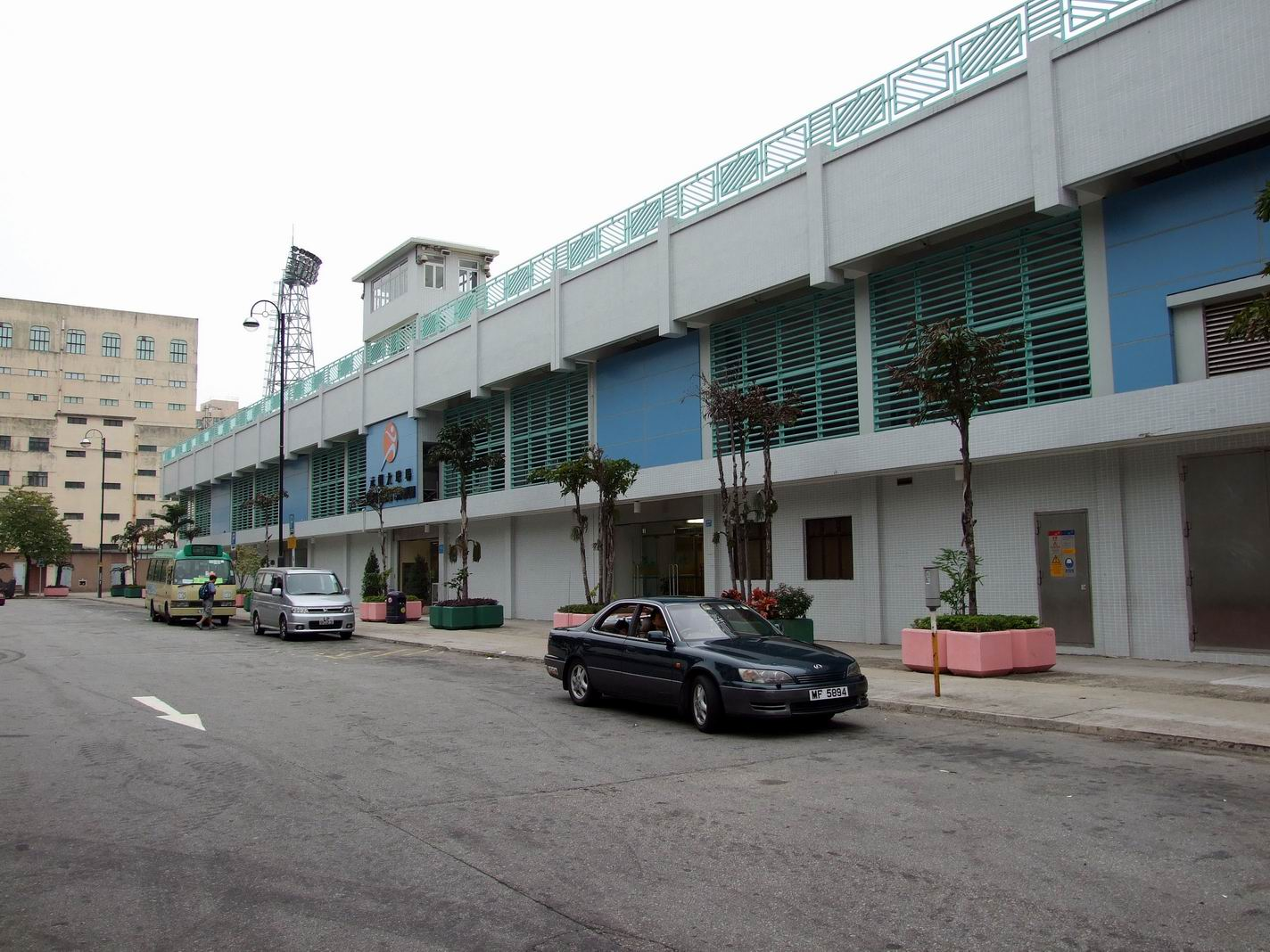
East Stand entrance

Originally a piece of vacant land next to Shui Bin Village, the stadium was built by the Yuen Long District Sports Association with local support. It was constructed by Yuen Long Cheong Kee Construction for HK$198,000 in 1965.

The stadium opened on 15 December 1969 with a First Division match between Yuen Long and Fire Services. On the same day, it hosted the start and the finish of the first marathon in Hong Kong held by Hong Kong Association of Athletics Affiliates, sponsored by Tin Tin Daily.

In 1983, the stadium received a HK$3 million endowment from Royal Hong Kong Jockey Club for expansion. The work, which cost HK$12 million in total, added a new 2,000-capacity covered grandstand and an eight-lane all-weather running track. The playing surface was also re-laid during the construction.

In recent years, the stadium has been transferred to and operated by the Leisure and Cultural Services Department of Hong Kong.

== Tenants ==
=== Yuen Long District S.A. ===
From the 1970s to 1980, the stadium had been the home ground for Yuen Long, who were playing at the Hong Kong First Division before withdrawing from the top tier after the 1979–80 season. Nowadays, it occasionally hosts home matches for their amateur and youth teams in lower divisions.

=== Pegasus ===
==== 2008–09 season ====
On 22 July 2008, newly formed Tin Shui Wai Pegasus applied for permission to play home fixtures in their inaugural season at Yuen Long Stadium, which was rejected by the HKFA due to the quality of playing surface.

In September 2008, after reaching an agreement with the away side, TSW Pegasus requested to play their home game against South China on 5 October at Yuen Long Stadium, which was approved by the HKFA. It was arranged that the league tie between Mutual and Citizen on the same match day would also be moved to this stadium, which was later scheduled to host two more TSW Pegasus home games in the second half of the season.

TSW Pegasus chairman Wilson Wong and the HKFA officials visited the ground on 17 September 2008 to explore the possibility for hosting more league matches at Yuen Long Stadium during the season. It was concluded that the ground was not equipped with up to four changing rooms to accommodate multiple matches on the same match day; while there were no scoreboards, ticket booths and substitute benches on the sideline to meet FIFA standards, the exits for supporters were not clearly indicated. HKFA Head of Competitions Lam Shing Kui reaffirmed the stadium was only suitable for one game per match day. The conditions of the existing playing surface, floodlights, executive box, first-aid room, referee's room and changing rooms were adequate to host First Division matches, with an option of setting up additional VIP areas and media facilities including internet access temporarily. Substitute benches would be borrowed from Tai Po Sports Ground.

The ground was scheduled to host two First Division fixtures on 5 October, with Mutual against Citizen kick-off at 12:30 and TSW Pegasus against South China at 16:00. However, both matches were postponed due to waterlogged pitch. Three days later, the hosts defeated South China 3-2 in front of an attendance of 2,537 in the rescheduled fixture, which was the ground's first First Division match in 22 years.

==== 2009–13 seasons ====
Pegasus used the stadium as their home ground for domestic games for four seasons from 2009–13.

They were forced to play their home games in the 2011 AFC Cup at Tseung Kwan O Sports Ground as their home ground failed to fulfil the requirements from the Asian Football Confederation.

==== 2020–2021 ====
On 20 October 2020, Pegasus announced that the club would be moving its operations back to Yuen Long District, including the hosting of their home matches at Yuen Long Stadium.

=== Yuen Long FC ===
The stadium was the home ground of Yuen Long since their promotion to the top flight in 2013–14 until their self relegation after the 2019–20 season.

== Facilities ==
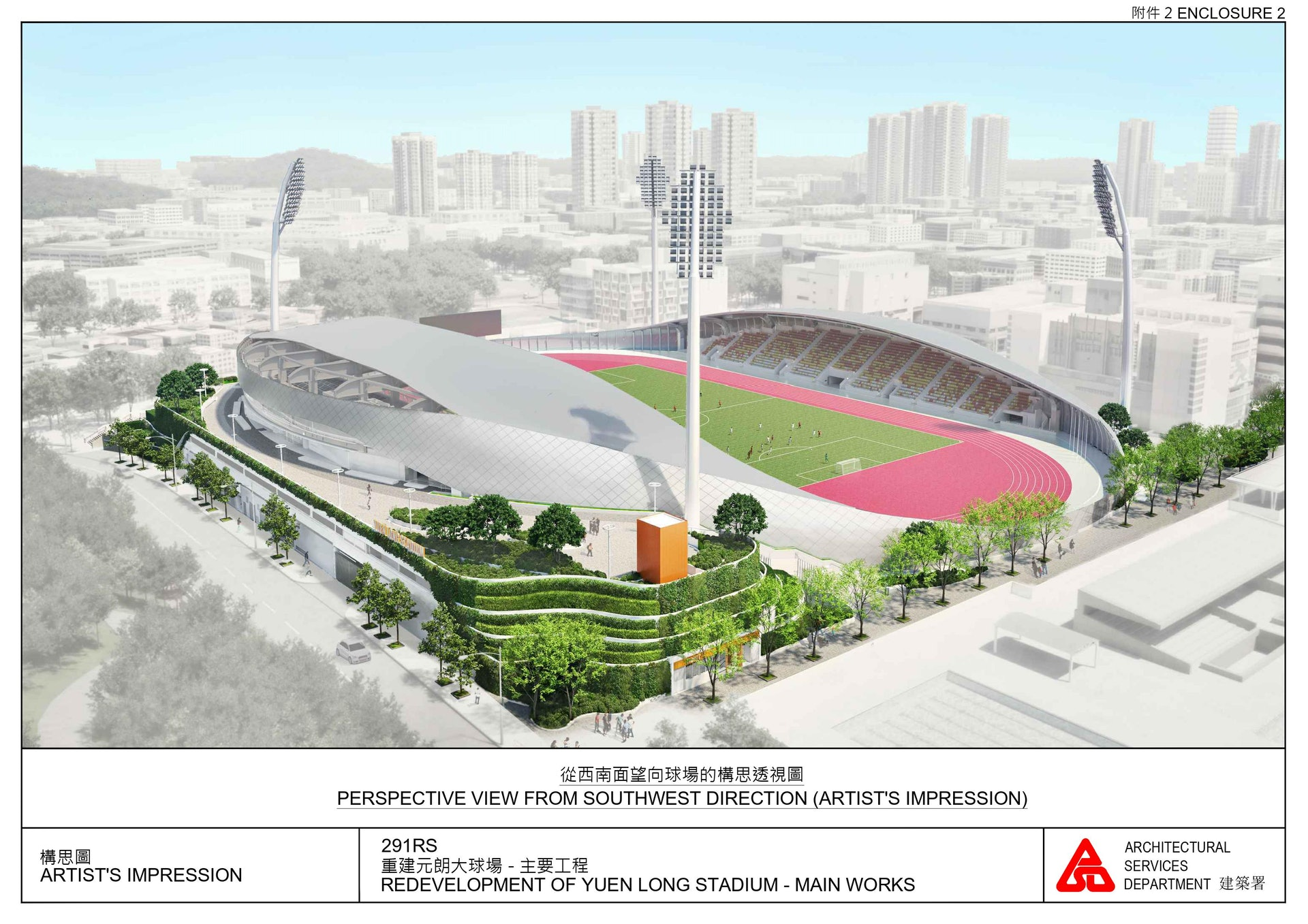
Architectural Services Department's rendering of Yuen Long Stadium after redevelopment.

The stadium features a world standard natural turf pitch with flood light system and two stands constructed on either side of the pitch. The athletics track is a world standard all-weather 400m eight-lane oval.

It is open to public six days a week from 08:00 to 22:30, except for one hour from 12:30 to 13:30. It is closed for maintenance every Wednesday.

== Future developments ==
In October 2013, the Leisure and Cultural Services Department announced plans to redevelop the stadium to fulfil requirements for hosting international matches. Capacity will rise to no less than 5,000, with both East and West Stands covered. Other improvements include executive boxes, trophy presentation area, electronic turnstiles and television gantry. Yuen Long chairman Wilson Wong revealed that the club will play their home games on other grounds during the revamp.

However as of January 2018, the project has yet to begin due to a dispute between the LCSD and the Yuen Long District Council over the East Stand. While the LCSD submitted plans which included a rebuilt West Stand, it did not include plans to provide a roof over the East Stand. The District Council have insisted that they will not approve any plans without a roof over the East Stand.

In September 2019, plans to build a roof over the East Stand were finally approved and redevelopment of the stadium is scheduled to begin in the fourth quarter of 2021.

On 11 April 2022, the Home Affairs Bureau submitted new redevelopment plans to the Finance Committee for approval. The project is estimated to cost $1.527 billion and will expand Yuen Long Stadium's capacity to 6,000, increase the number of parking spaces to 104, and include the provision of ancillary facilities to make the stadium compliant with Asian Football Confederation requirements.

In 2025, it was announced that the opening date would be pushed back to the 2nd quarter of 2026.

== Gallery ==
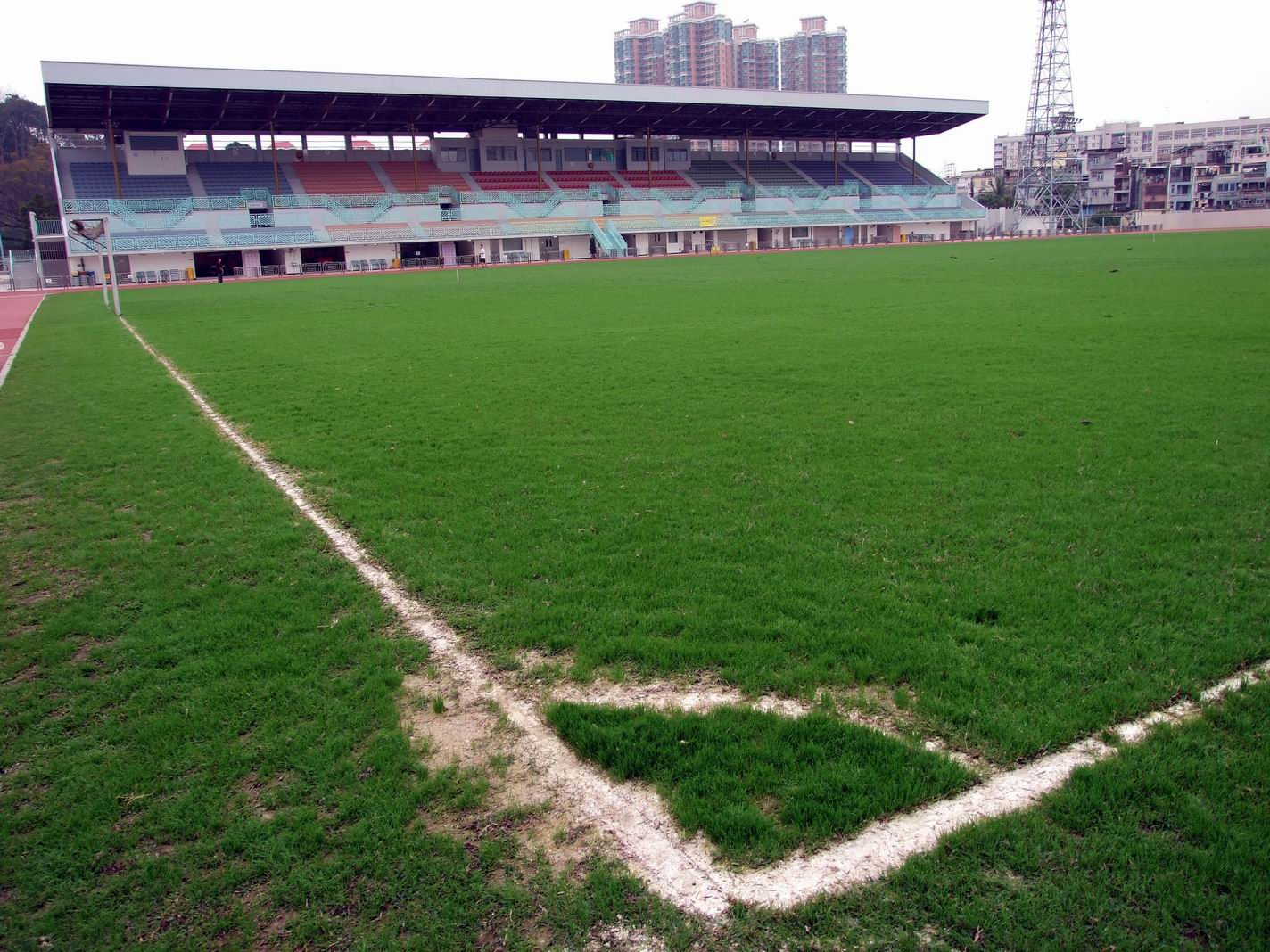
Football pitch and covered West Grandstand

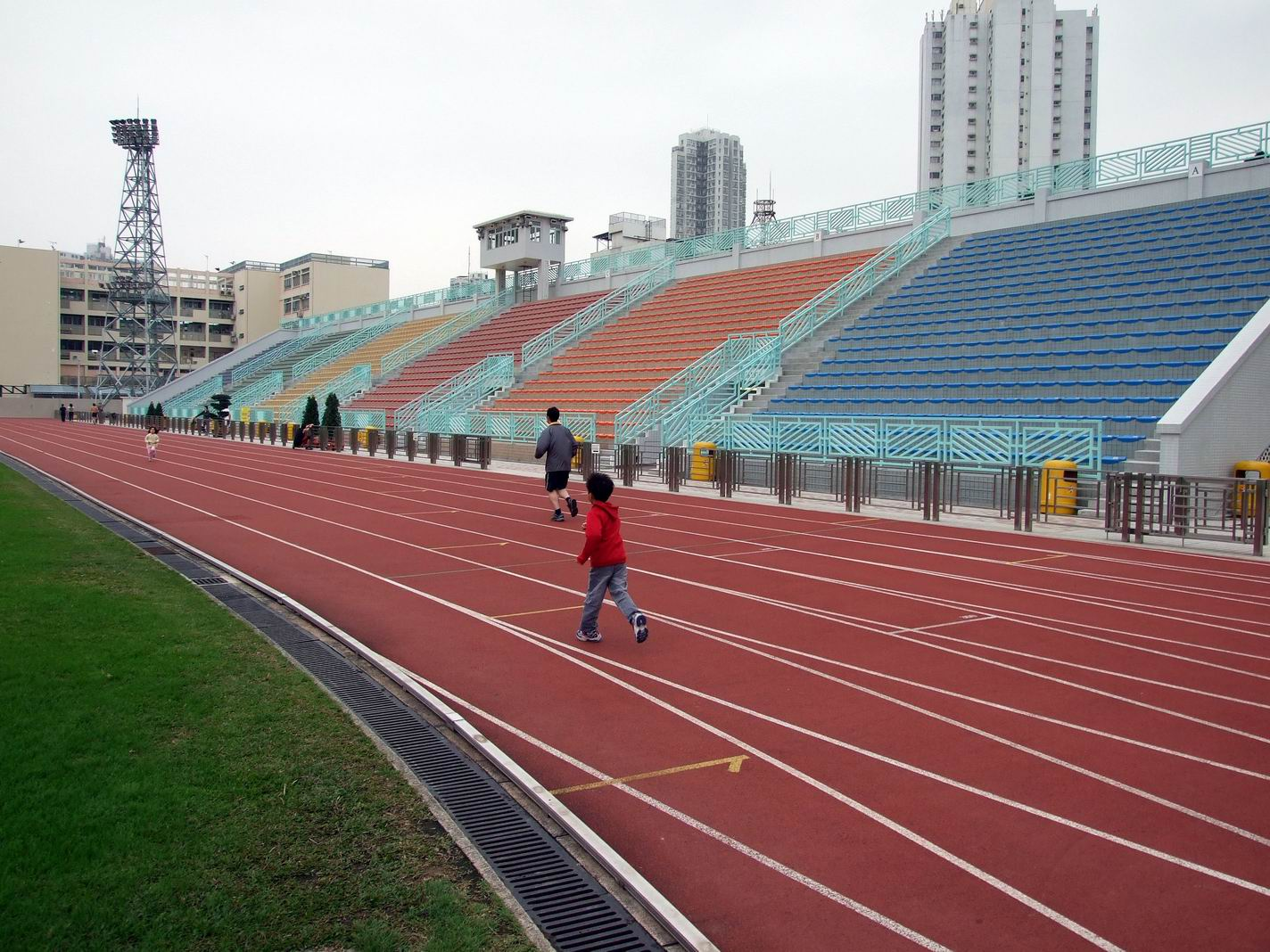
Running track and uncovered East Grandstand

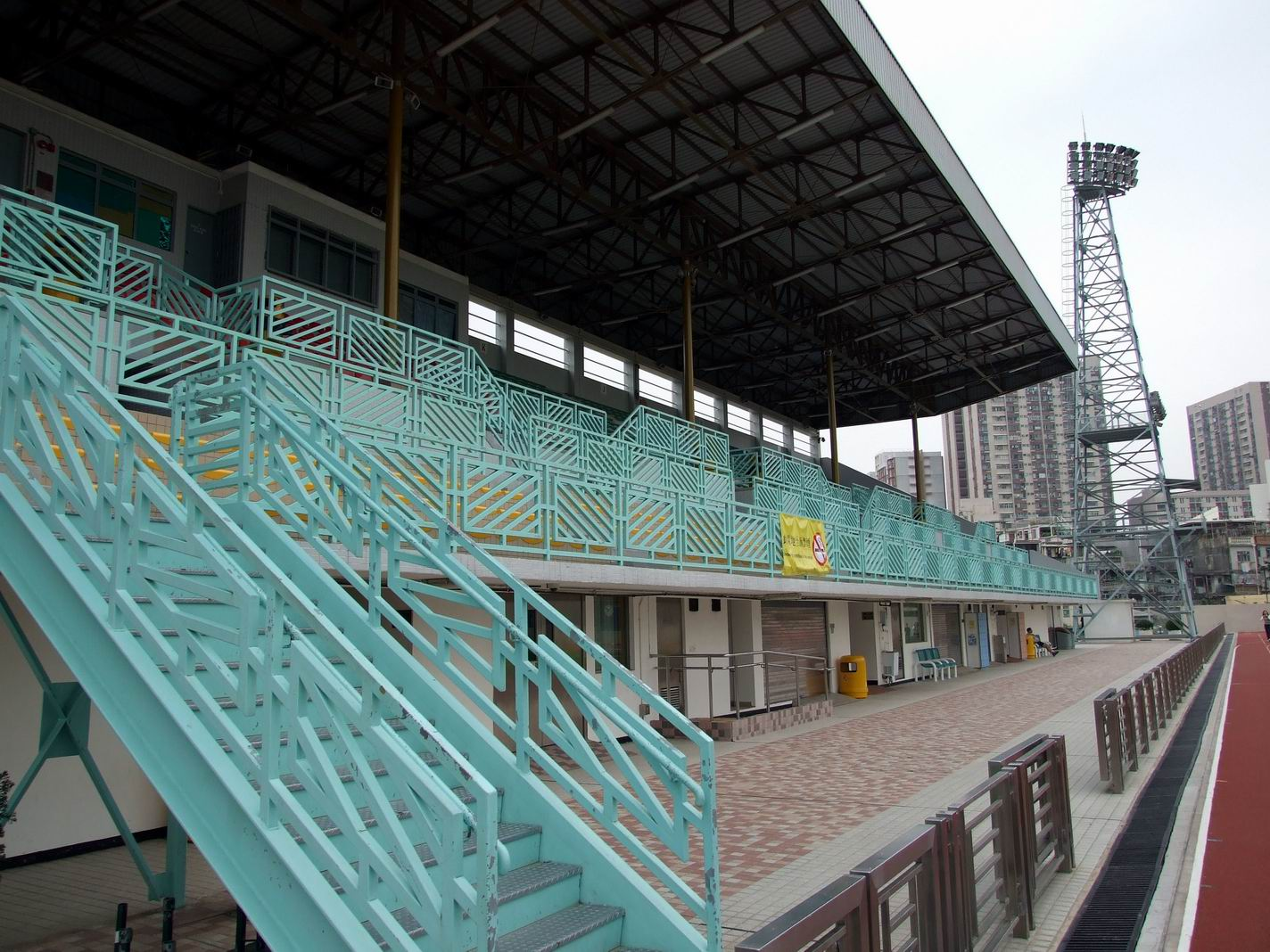
Covered West Grandstand

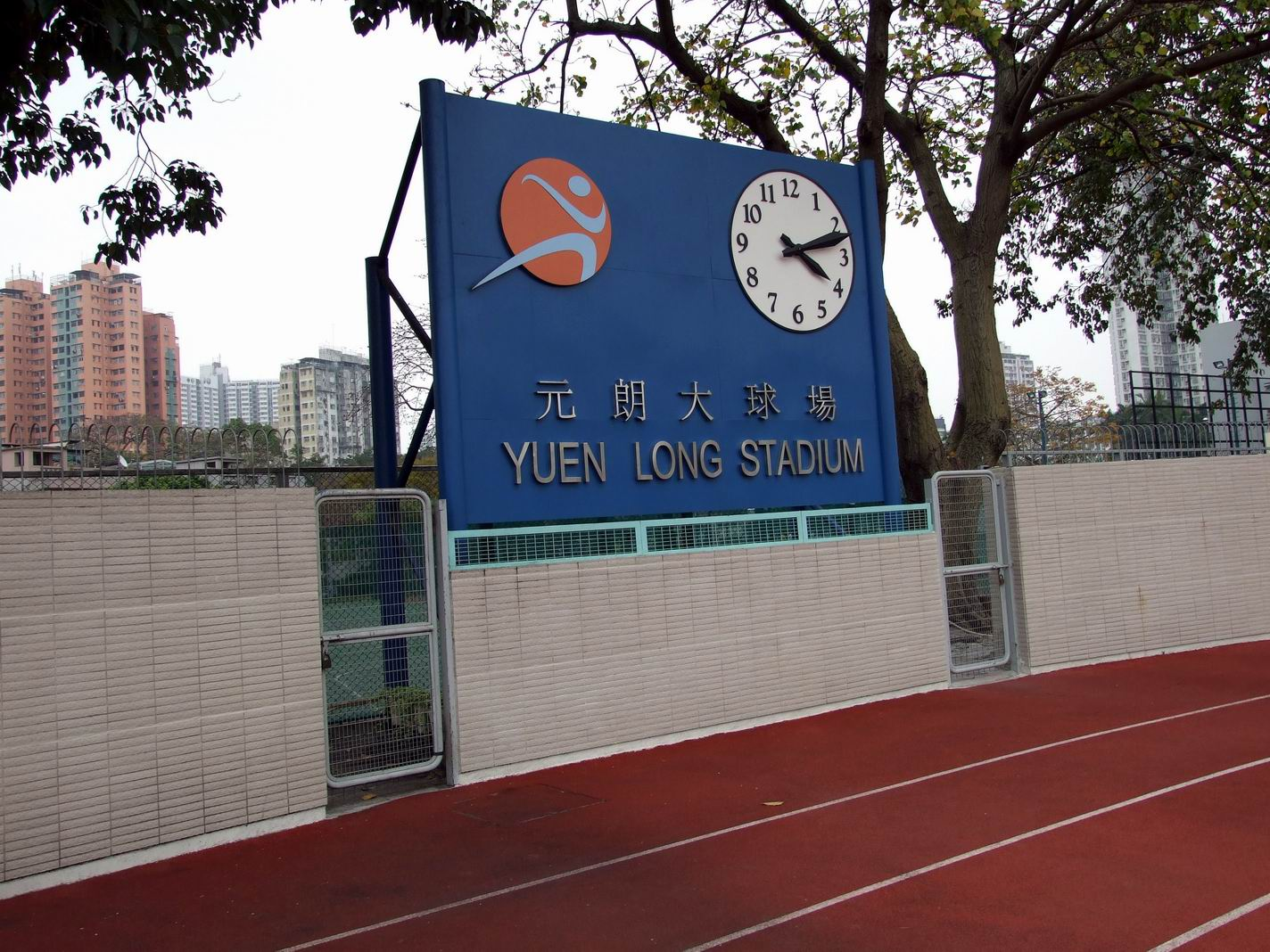
Clock

== Transport ==
There are a couple Light Rail stops near Yuen Long Stadium, the closest being Fung Nin Road, about five minutes walk away from the ground, and Shui Pin Wai, also about a five minute walk away. Both stops are served by routes 610, 614, 615 and 761P.

The nearest MTR station is Long Ping on the Tuen Ma line, which is about a seven to twelve minute walk from the stadium.

A number of KMB routes run near the stadium, such as 68X, 268B, 268C, 268X, 269D, 276, 276P and B1, each of which run down Castle Peak Road.
