= Kowloon Bay Park =

Public park in Kowloon Bay, Hong Kong

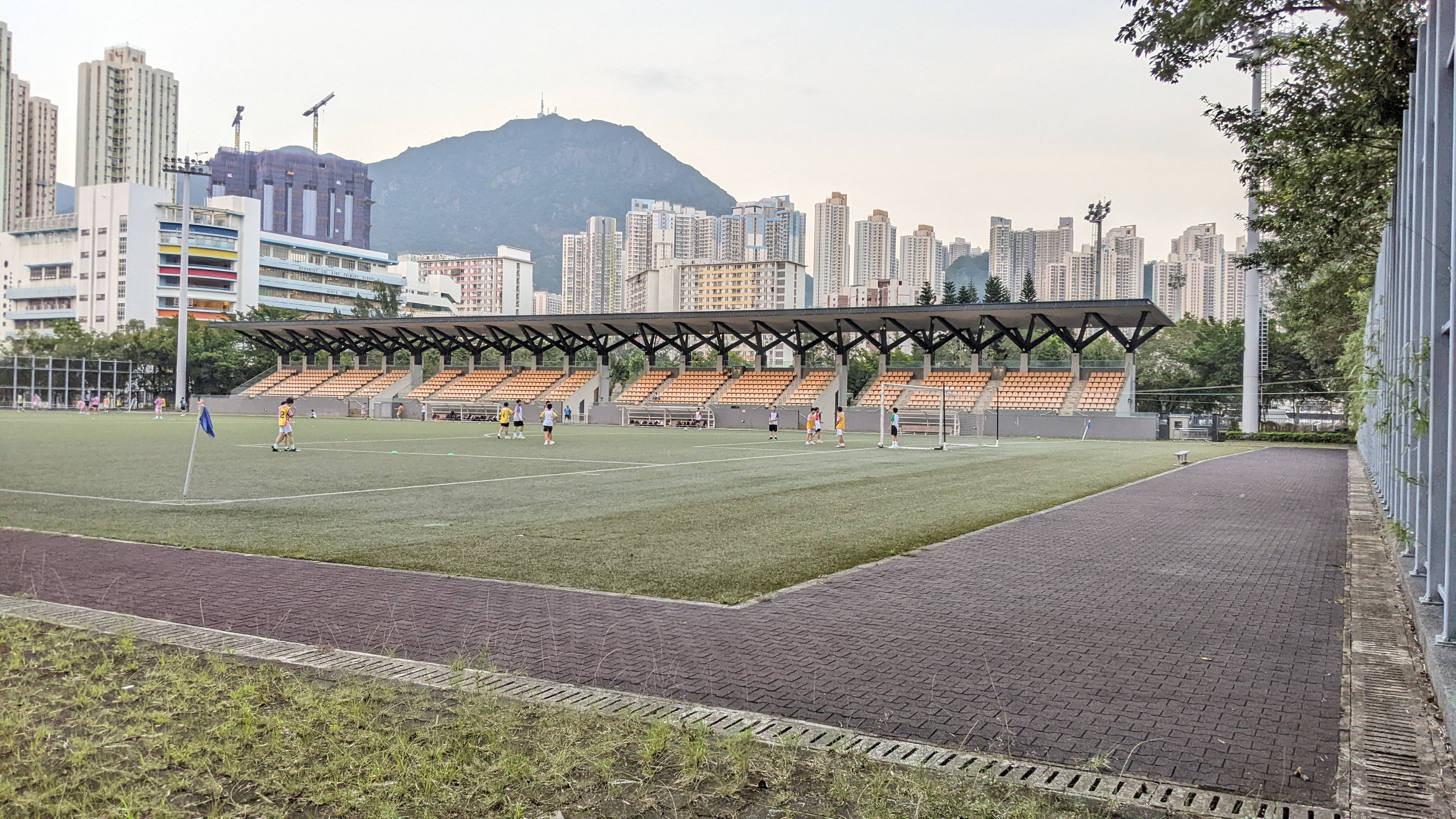
- Interactive map of Kowloon Bay Park
- Address: 18 Kai Lai Road, Kowloon Bay, Kowloon
- Coordinates: 22.326781°N 114.206424°E
- Owner: Hong Kong Government
- Operator: Leisure and Cultural Services Department
- Capacity: 1,200
- Surface: Grass
- Pitch size: 100 x 69 metres (110 x 75 yards)

Construction
- Opened: 30 March 2005; 21 years ago

Tenant
- Rangers (2014–15)

Kowloon Bay Park (Chinese: 九龍灣公園) is a public park in Kowloon Bay, Kowloon, Hong Kong. The park is managed by Leisure and Cultural Services Department. It was opened on 30 March 2005.

== Facilities ==
=== Natural turf pitch ===
The natural turf pitch is designed for soccer and rugby games. It was opened on 3 May 2005.

Since 2009–10 season, it has been a Hong Kong First Division venue.

=== Cycling ground ===
There is a cycling area within the park. A kiosk offers bicycles for hire.

== See also ==
- List of urban public parks and gardens in Hong Kong
