= Hong Kong Pegasus F.C. =

Association football club in Hong Kong, China

Ling Yui Orion
- Full name: TSW Pegasus FC Limited
- Nickname: The Flying Horsemen
- Founded: 2008; 18 years ago
- President: Steven Lo
- Head coach: Yan Chi Kan
- League: Hong Kong Third Division
- 2025–26: Third Division, 14th of 16
Home colours	Away colours

Hong Kong Pegasus FC (Chinese: 香港飛馬足球會), currently known as Ling Yui Orion FC due to sponsorship reasons, is a Hong Kong football club based in Yuen Long. Founded in 2008, the club currently competes in the Hong Kong Third Division.

== History ==
TSW Pegasus was established in June 2008, and they had their first season in 2008–09 Hong Kong First Division League with a budget of about HKD$100,000,000.

On 21 December 2008, Pegasus won their first trophy, defeating Sun Hei in the 2008 Senior Shield Final.

In July 2012, the club was renamed as Sun Pegasus following introduction of a new sponsor.

After the 2014–15 season, Sun International Resources Limited withdrew their sponsorship. Their club was renamed Hong Kong Pegasus following a takeover by Canny Leung.

In October 2020, the club was renamed back to TSW Pegasus and returned to Yuen Long Stadium.

After spending 13 years in top flight, Pegasus confirmed their withdrawal from the 2021–22 HKPL season and decided to self-relegate to the Hong Kong Third Division.

In the 2023–24 season, the club was renamed to Ravia Orion FC.

In the 2024–25 season, the club was renamed to Ling Yui Orion FC.

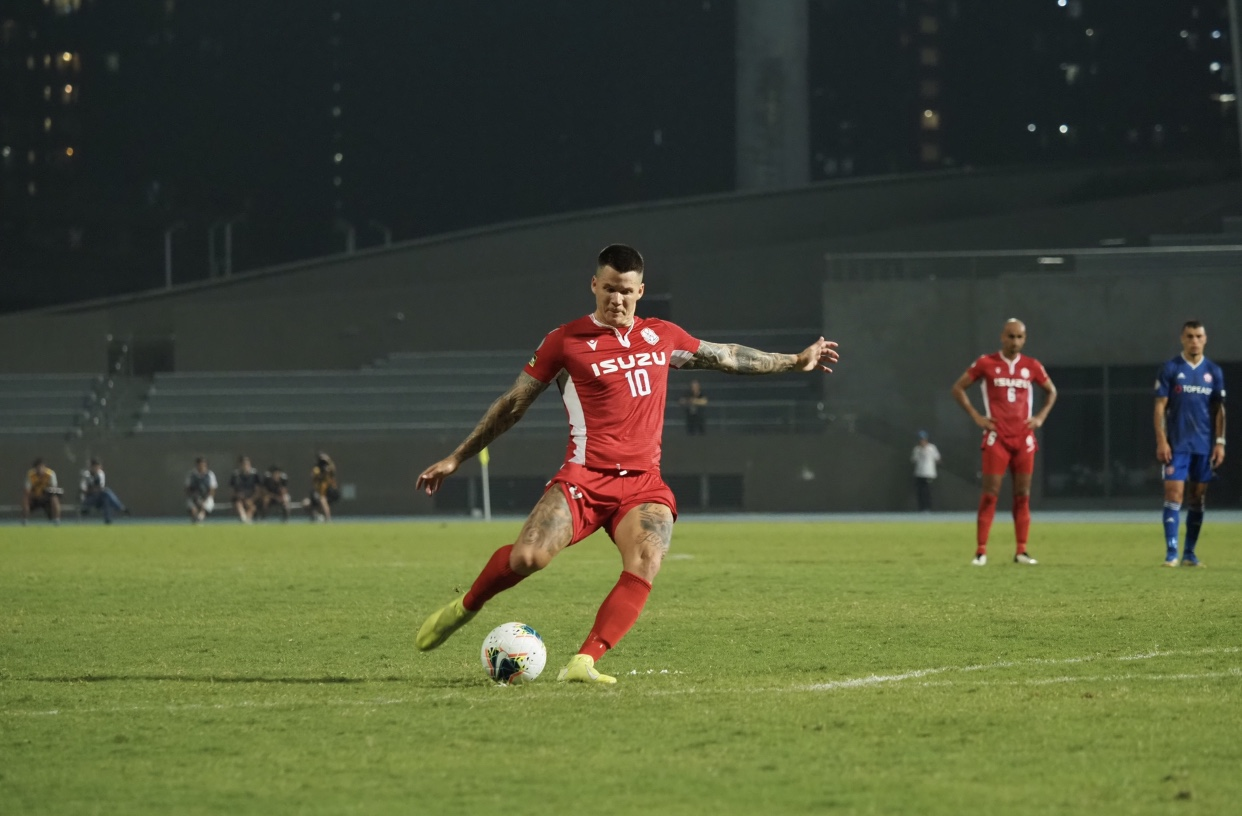
Travis Major scored 28 league goals for the club

== Name history ==
- 2008–2012: TSW Pegasus (天水圍飛馬)
- 2012–2015: Sun Pegasus (太陽飛馬)
- 2015–2020: Hong Kong Pegasus (香港飛馬)
- 2020–2021: TSW Pegasus (天水圍飛馬)
- 2021–2023: Hong Kong Pegasus (香港飛馬)
- 2023–2024: Ravia Orion FC (奧利安)
- 2024–present: Ling Yui Orion FC (凌銳奧利安)

== Colours and badge ==
Pegasus's home colours are a red shirt with white shorts. Their away colours are a white shirt with black shorts. The current kits are designed by adidas. The team historically has played with an all yellow kit as their home colours, but after their name change to Hong Kong Pegasus, the club owners decided to make a change. It proved to be a largely unpopular decision with the club's fans.

The current Pegasus badge is a pegasus inside a yellow and red shield, which is representative of "creating miracles", "vigor", "vitality" and "creativeness" in Greek mythology.

== Stadium ==
TSW Pegasus applied to the Hong Kong Football Association for the use of Yuen Long Stadium and Tin Shui Wai Sports Ground for its home matches. HKFA replied that it will grant the application provided the grass turf at the stadium is up to standard after its examination. Later, the HKFA accepted the application of having the Yuen Long Stadium as TSW Pegasus's home ground for the game against South China on 5 October 2008. The team's directors promised to make a fanfare at the stadium on the day.

HKFA chairman Leung Hung Tak later claimed that a total of three home games for TSW Pegasus will be played at Yuen Long Stadium in the 2008–09 season.

For the 2013–14 season, TSW Pegasus has moved its home ground from Yuen Long Stadium to Mong Kok Stadium.

From 2015 to 2018, the club used Hong Kong Stadium as their home ground.

By virtue of their third-place finish in the 2017–18 season, Pegasus exercised their right to use the Mong Kok Stadium for 2018–19.

In October 2020, Pegasus returned to Yuen Long Stadium.

== Supporters ==
Pegasus has a fanbase mainly based in Yuen Long and Tin Shui Wai as they are Pegasus' original home districts. The club has an official fanclub known as "Pegasus Base". The club's slogan is "Pegasus, our team".

== Community contribution ==
TSW Pegasus held a big recruitment event at Tin Shui Wai Sports Ground to recruit U-15 and U-19 team players on 3 August 2008. At the same time, the team also recruited a few team assistants in order to provide job opportunity for the local residents. It played a friendly game against South China in the afternoon and the teams drew 1–1, TSW Pegasus lost (3–5) on penalties.

== Season-to-season record ==
Season	Tier	Division	Teams	Position	Home stadium	Attendance/G	FA Cup	Senior Shield	League Cup	Sapling Cup
2008–09	1	First Division	13	7			Runner-up	Champions	Runner-up	Not held
2009–10	1	First Division	11	2	Yuen Long Stadium	1,027	Champions	Semi-finals	Not held	Not held
2010–11	1	First Division	10	3	Yuen Long Stadium	705	Semi-finals	Quarter-finals	Runner-up	Not held
2011–12	1	First Division	10	2	Yuen Long Stadium	1,252	Runner-up	Semi-finals	Runner-up	Not held
2012–13	1	First Division	10	5	Yuen Long Stadium	722	Runner-up	Quarter-finals	Not held	Not held
2013–14	1	First Division	12	2	Mong Kok Stadium	1,589	First round	Runner-up	Not held	Not held
2014–15	1	Premier League	9	3	Mong Kok Stadium	1,617	First round	Quarter-finals	Semi-finals	Not held
2015–16	1	Premier League	9	5	Hong Kong Stadium	981	Champions	Quarter-finals	Group stage	Champions
2016–17	1	Premier League	11	8	Hong Kong Stadium	724	Quarter-finals	Quarter-finals	Defunct	Runner-up
2017–18	1	Premier League	10	3	Hong Kong Stadium	830	Semi-finals	Quarter-finals	Defunct	Semi-finals
2018–19	1	Premier League	10	6	Mong Kok Stadium	966	Quarter-finals	First round	Defunct	Semi-finals
2019–20	1	Premier League	10	Withdrew	Hong Kong Stadium	551	Semi-finals	Quarter-finals	Defunct	Group stage
2020–21	1	Premier League	8	4	Yuen Long Stadium	1,410	Cancelled due to COVID-19 pandemic		Defunct	Group stage

Note:

1st or Champions 2nd or Runner-up 3rd place Promotion Relegation

== Continental record ==
Season	Competition	Round	Club	Home	Away	Aggregate
2011	AFC Cup	Group E	(Vietnam) Sông Lam Nghệ An	2–3	2–1	3rd
2011	AFC Cup	Group E	(Indonesia) Sriwijaya	1–2	2–3	3rd
2011	AFC Cup	Group E	(Maldives) VB	3–0	5–3	3rd

== Honours ==
=== Cup competitions ===
- Hong Kong Senior Shield
  - Champions (1): 2008–09
- Hong Kong FA Cup
  - Champions (2): 2009–10, 2015–16
- Hong Kong Sapling Cup
  - Champions (1): 2015–16

== Managers ==
- (Brazil) José Ricardo Rambo (1 July 2008 – June 2009)
- (Serbia) Dejan Antonić (August 2009 – 30 December 2009)
- (Brazil) José Ricardo Rambo (30 December 2009 – 30 June 2010)
- (Hong Kong) Chan Hiu Ming (1 July 2010 – 14 June 2012)
- (Hong Kong) Chan Ho Yin (10 July 2012 – 9 October 2012)
- (Hong Kong) Chan Chi Hong (9 October 2012 – 9 June 2014)
- (Brazil) José Ricardo Rambo (9 June 2014 – 27 January 2015)
- (Hong Kong) Chan Chi Hong (27 January 2015 – 30 June 2015)
- (Hong Kong) Lee Chi Kin (8 July 2015 – 11 April 2016)
- (England) Kevin Bond (11 April 2016 – May 2016)
- (England) Steve Gallen (23 June 2016 – 3 November 2016)
- (England) Kevin Bond (7 November 2016, – 6 May 2017)
- (Hong Kong) Yeung Ching Kwong (19 June 2017 – 14 June 2018)
- (Spain) Pedro García (2 July 2018 – 30 September 2018)
- (Hong Kong) Chan Ho Yin (30 September 2018 – 10 July 2019)
- (Hong Kong) Man Pei Tak (10 July 2019 – 10 May 2020)
- (Hong Kong) Kwok Kar Lok (10 May 2020 – 30 June 2021)
