= 2017 in Chinese football =

Football in China
- Season: 2017

Men's football
- Super League: Guangzhou Evergrande
- League One: Dalian Yifang
- League Two: Heilongjiang Lava Spring
- Amateur League: Zibo Sunday
- CFA Super Cup: Guangzhou Evergrande

The 2017 season was the 67th season of competitive association football in China.

== Promotion and relegation ==
League	Promoted to league	Relegated from league	Withdrew from league
Chinese Super League	Tianjin Quanjian; Guizhou Hengfeng Zhicheng	Hangzhou Greentown; Shijiazhuang Ever Bright	
China League One	Yunnan Lijiang; Baoding Yingli ETS	Qingdao Jonoon; Hunan Billows	
China League Two	Dalian Boyoung; Shaanxi Chang'an Athletic; Shanghai Sunfun; Jilin Baijia; Zhenjiang Huasa		Tianjin Huochetou

== National teams ==
=== China national football team ===
==== FIFA ranking ====
Month	Jan	Feb	Mar	Apr	May	Jun	Jul	Aug	Sept	Oct	Nov	Dec
Points	424	404	407	425	425	425	441	447	564	626	561	498
Ranking (World)	81	86	86	81	81	82	77	77	62	57	60	71
Ranking (AFC)	8	9	9	9	9	9	8	8	6	4	5	6

==== Results and fixtures ====
10 January 2017 2017 China Cup	China	0–2	Iceland	Nanning, China
19:35 UTC+8			Finnbogason 64'; Sigurðarson 88'	Stadium: Guangxi Sports Center; Attendance: 23,876; Referee: Kim Jong-hyeok (South Korea)

14 January 2017 2017 China Cup	China	1–1 (4–3 p)	Croatia	Nanning, China
13:35 UTC+8	Wang Jingbin 88'		Ivanušec 37'	Stadium: Guangxi Sports Center; Attendance: 25,576; Referee: Ko Hyung-jin (South Korea)
	Penalties
	Yin Hongbo (penalty scored); Chi Zhongguo (penalty scored); Fan Xiaodong (penalty missed); Wang Jingbin (penalty scored); Wang Jinxian (penalty scored)		(penalty scored) Pivarić; (penalty scored) Ozobić; (penalty missed) Perošević; (penalty scored) Juranović; (penalty missed) Mišić

23 March 2017 2018 FIFA World Cup Qual. AFC 3rd Round	China	1–0	South Korea	Changsha, China
19:35 UTC+8	Yu Dabao 34'	Report (FIFA); Report (AFC)		Stadium: Helong Stadium; Attendance: 30,950; Referee: Peter Green (Australia)

28 March 2017 2018 FIFA World Cup Qual. AFC 3rd Round	Iran	1–0	China	Tehran, Iran
16:30 UTC+4:30	Taremi 46'	Report (FIFA); Report (AFC)		Stadium: Azadi Stadium; Attendance: 78,115; Referee: Muhammad Taqi (Singapore)

7 June 2017 Friendly	China	8–1	Philippines	Guangzhou, China
19:35 UTC+8	Ren Hang 3'; Xiao Zhi 26'; Yu Hanchao 44'; Wang Yongpo 54'; Yin Hongbo 56'; Zhang Xizhe 68'; Deng Hanwen 72', 90'		Bahadoran 33'	Stadium: Tianhe Stadium; Attendance: 21,268; Referee: Zhang Lei (China)

13 June 2017 2018 FIFA World Cup Qual. AFC 3rd Round	Syria	2–2	China	Krubong, Malaysia (Note: Syria played their home matches outside Syria due to security concerns from the Syrian Civil War.)
21:45 UTC+8	Al-Mawas 12' (pen.); Al Salih 90+3'	Report (FIFA); Report (AFC)	Gao Lin 68' (pen.); Wu Xi 75'	Stadium: Hang Jebat Stadium; Attendance: 4,737; Referee: Ammar Al-Jeneibi (United Arab Emirates)

31 August 2017 2018 FIFA World Cup Qual. AFC 3rd Round	China	1–0	Uzbekistan	Wuhan, China
20:00 UTC+8	Gao Lin 84' (pen.)	Report (FIFA); Report (AFC)		Stadium: Wuhan Sports Center Stadium; Attendance: 51,666; Referee: Hettikamkanamge Perera (Sri Lanka)

5 September 2017 2018 FIFA World Cup Qual. AFC 3rd Round	Qatar	1–2	China	Doha, Qatar
18:00 UTC+3	Afif 47'	Report (FIFA); Report (AFC)	Xiao Zhi 74'; Wu Lei 83'	Stadium: Khalifa International Stadium; Attendance: 5,686; Referee: Ahmed Al-Kaf (Oman)

10 November 2017 Friendly	China	0–2	Serbia	Guangzhou, China
19:35 UTC+8			Ljajić 20'; Mitrović 69'	Stadium: Tianhe Stadium; Attendance: 17,160; Referee: Hettikamkanamge Perera (Sri Lanka)

14 November 2017 Friendly	China	0–4	Colombia	Chongqing, China
19:35 UTC+8			Pardo 5'; Bacca 61'; Borja 66', 90+1'	Stadium: Chongqing Olympic Sports Center; Attendance: 12,560; Referee: Jumpei Iida (Japan)

9 December 2017 2017 EAFF E-1 Football Championship	China	2–2	South Korea	Tokyo, Japan
16:30 UTC+9	Wei Shihao 9'; Yu Dabao 76'	Report	Kim Shin-wook 12'; Lee Jae-sung 19'	Stadium: Ajinomoto Stadium; Attendance: 9,103; Referee: Khamis Al-Marri (Qatar)

12 December 2017 2017 EAFF E-1 Football Championship	Japan	2–1	China	Tokyo, Japan
19:15 UTC+9	Kobayashi 84'; Shōji 88'	Report	Yu Dabao 90+3' (pen.)	Stadium: Ajinomoto Stadium; Attendance: 17,220; Referee: Muhammad Taqi (Singapore)

16 December 2017 2017 EAFF E-1 Football Championship	China	1–1	North Korea	Tokyo, Japan
16:30 UTC+9	Wei Shihao 28'	Report	Jong Il-gwan 81'	Stadium: Ajinomoto Stadium; Attendance: 18,272; Referee: Valentin Kovalenko (Uzbekistan)

=== China women's national football team ===
==== FIFA ranking ====
Month	Mar	Jun	Sept	Dec
Points	1882	1875	1875	1861
Ranking (World)	14	14	13	16
Ranking (AFC)	4	4	4	5

==== Results and fixtures ====
19 January 2017 2017 Four Nations Tournament	China	2–0	Thailand	Foshan, China
19:35 UTC+8	Wang Shuang 21'; Lou Jiahui 90+3'			Stadium: Century Lotus Stadium; Referee: Yu Hong (China)

21 January 2017 2017 Four Nations Tournament	China	2–0	Myanmar	Foshan, China
16:00 UTC+8	Zhang Rui 48', 60'			Stadium: Century Lotus Stadium; Referee: Mi Siyu (China)

24 January 2017 2017 Four Nations Tournament	China	5–0	Ukraine	Foshan, China
19:35 UTC+8	Wang Shuang 22', 43' (pen.); Ren Guixin 25'; Tang Jiali 29'; Yan Jinjin 83'			Stadium: Century Lotus Stadium; Referee: Guan Xing (China)

1 March 2017 2017 Algarve Cup	China	0–1	Netherlands	Lagos, Portugal
15:00 UTC+0			Jansen 13'	Stadium: Lagos Municipal Stadium; Referee: Marianela Araya (Costa Rica)

3 March 2017 2017 Algarve Cup	China	0–0	Sweden	Vila Real de Santo António, Portugal
18:30 UTC+0				Stadium: VRS António Sports Complex; Referee: Anastasia Pustovoitova (Russia)

6 March 2017 2017 Algarve Cup	China	1–2	Australia	Albufeira, Portugal
15:00 UTC+0	Wang Shanshan 36'		Gielnik 61'; Carpenter 84'	Stadium: Albufeira Municipal Stadium; Referee: Riem Hussein (Germany)

8 March 2017 2017 Algarve Cup	China	1–2	Iceland	Parchal, Portugal
18:30 UTC+0	Wang Shanshan 36'		Sigurðardóttir 9', 47'	Stadium: Bela Vista Municipal Stadium; Referee: Laura Fortunato (Argentina)

6 April 2017 Friendly	China	2–0	Croatia	Kunshan, China
16:00 UTC+8	Wang Shuang 6'; Wang Shanshan 90+3'			Stadium: Kunshan Stadium; Referee: Ma Ning (China)

9 April 2017 Friendly	China	2–1	Croatia	Jiaxing, China
16:00 UTC+8	Bošnjak 13' (o.g.); Yang Li 50'		Nevrkla 90+4'	Stadium: Jiaxing Stadium; Referee: Gu Chunhan (China)

8 June 2017 Friendly	China	0–1	North Korea	Duyun, China
19:35 UTC+8			Sung Hyang-sim 37'	Stadium: Qiannan Nationwide Fitness Centre Stadium; Attendance: 19,324; Referee: Mi Siyu (China)

11 June 2017 Friendly	China	4–2	Finland	Changzhou, China
16:00 UTC+8	Xiao Yuyi 34'; Ma Jun 49'; Wang Shanshan 53'; Song Duan 70'		Öling 4'; Sällström 58'	Stadium: Changzhou Olympic Sports Center; Referee: Qin Liang (China)

19 October 2017 2017 Yongchuan International Tournament	China	1–2	North Korea	Chongqing, China
19:35 UTC+8	Wang Shanshan 73'		Kim Phyong-hwa 4'; Kim Yun-mi 67'	Stadium: Yongchuan Sports Center; Referee: Law Bik Chi (Hong Kong)

21 October 2017 2017 Yongchuan International Tournament	China	3–2	Mexico	Chongqing, China
19:35 UTC+8	Xiao Yuyi 30'; Zhang Rui 69'; Wang Shuang 75'		Calderón 1'; Ferral 54'	Stadium: Yongchuan Sports Center; Referee: Gu Chunhan (China)

24 October 2017 2017 Yongchuan International Tournament	China	2–2	Brazil	Chongqing, China
19:35 UTC+8	Wang Shanshan 54', 60'		Marta 32' (pen.); Adriana 34'	Stadium: Yongchuan Sports Center; Referee: Law Bik Chi (Hong Kong)

22 November 2017 Friendly	Australia	3–0	China	Melbourne, Australia
19:30 UTC+11	Kerr 23', 64'; Butt 53'			Stadium: AAMI Park; Attendance: 10,904; Referee: Esther Staubli (Switzerland)

26 November 2017 Friendly	Australia	5–1	China	Geelong, Australia
16:30 UTC+11	Simon 14'; Li Danyang 25' (o.g.); Kerr 37', 58'; Logarzo 68'		Ren Guixin 7'	Stadium: Simonds Stadium; Attendance: 6,338; Referee: Sandra Strub (Switzerland)

8 December 2017 2017 EAFF E-1 Football Championship	China	0–2	North Korea	Chiba, Japan
16:10 UTC+9		Report	Kim Yun-mi 24', 78'	Stadium: Fukuda Denshi Arena; Attendance: 1,201; Referee: Thein Thein Aye (Myanmar)

11 December 2017 2017 EAFF E-1 Football Championship	Japan	1–0	China	Chiba, Japan
18:55 UTC+9	Tanaka 20'	Report		Stadium: Fukuda Denshi Arena; Attendance: 3,163; Referee: Công Thị Dung (Vietnam)

15 December 2017 2017 EAFF E-1 Football Championship	China	3–1	South Korea	Chiba, Japan
16:10 UTC+9	Wang Shanshan 18'; Kim Do-yeon 35' (o.g.); Ren Guixin 90'	Report	Kang Yu-mi 85'	Stadium: Fukuda Denshi Arena; Attendance: 950; Referee: Edita Mirabidova (Uzbekistan)

=== China national under-23 football team ===
==== U-23 national team ====
9 February 2017 Friendly	Gimpo Citizen (South Korea)	2–2	China
			Wang Ziming 30'; Wang Junhui 60'

12 February 2017 Friendly	Suwon FC (South Korea)	3–0	China

15 February 2017 Friendly	Pohang Steelers (South Korea)	2–0	China

20 March 2017 Dubai Cup	China	1–1	Malaysia
	Yao Junsheng 69'

23 March 2017 Dubai Cup	China	0–0	Jordan

26 March 2017 Dubai Cup	China	2–1	Thailand
	Tang Shi 61', 67'

28 March 2017 Dubai Cup	China	1–0	United Arab Emirates
	Wang Jingbin 55'

10 June 2017 Friendly	China	1–0	Malaysia	Xiangtan Sports Centre, Xiangtan
19:00 UTC+8	Xiang Baixu 1'			Referee: Fu Ming

13 June 2017 Friendly	China	3–2	Uzbekistan	Chenzhou Olympic Sports Centre Stadium, Chenzhou
19:35 UTC+8	Yang Liyu 16'; Wei Shihao 24'; Liu Junshuai 79'			Referee: Gu Chunhan

19 July 2017 2018 AFC U-23 Championship qualification	China	0–0	Cambodia	Phnom Penh Olympic Stadium, Phnom Penh
18:30 UTC+7		Report		Attendance: 7,326; Referee: Kim Dae-yong (South Korea)

21 July 2017 2018 AFC U-23 Championship qualification	Philippines	0–2	China	Phnom Penh Olympic Stadium, Phnom Penh
15:30 UTC+7		Report	He Chao 14'; Zhang Xiuwei 73'	Attendance: 4,328; Referee: Timur Faizullin (Kyrgyzstan)

23 July 2017 2018 AFC U-23 Championship qualification	Japan	1–2	China	Phnom Penh Olympic Stadium, Phnom Penh
15:30 UTC+7	Endo 54'	Report	Wei Shihao 40'; Deng Hanwen 45+1'	Attendance: 6,372; Referee: Payam Heidari (Iran)

28 August 2017 Friendly	Brisbane Roar (Australia)	2–1	China	Robina Stadium, Gold Coast
19:30 AEST	Skapetis 9'; Maccarone 88' (pen.)	Report	Wei Shihao 18'	Referee: Adam Kersey

31 August 2017 Friendly	Central Coast Mariners (Australia)	3–0	China	Robina Stadium, Gold Coast
11:00	Brama 26'; McGing 40'; Asdrúbal 90'	Report

4 September 2017 Friendly	Gold Coast City (Australia)	1–1	China	Palm Beach Club, Palm Beach, Queensland
19:30			Wei Shihao 2'

4 October 2017 Friendly	China	3–4	Honduras	Jiangyin Stadium, Jiangyin
16:00 UTC+8	Zhang Yuning 6'; Yao Junsheng 16' ? 41' (o.g.)

7 October 2017 Friendly	China	2–2	Honduras	Jiangyin Stadium, Jiangyin
19:35 UTC+8	Wei Shihao 45'; Zhang Yuning 83'

8 November 2017 Duyun International Youth Football Tournament	China	0–2	Saudi Arabia	Qiannan Nationwide Fitness Centre Stadium, Duyun
20:00 UTC+8

10 November 2017 Duyun International Youth Football Tournament	China	2–1	North Korea	Qiannan Nationwide Fitness Centre Stadium, Duyun
15:00 UTC+8	Feng Boyuan 53'; Liu Yang 79'

12 November 2017 Duyun International Youth Football Tournament	China	1–1	Mexico	Qiannan Nationwide Fitness Centre Stadium, Duyun
20:00 UTC+8	Yao Junsheng 79'

24 December 2017 Friendly	Hatta (United Arab Emirates)	2–2	China
		Report	Yao Junsheng 25'; Hu Jinghang 70'

29 December 2017 Friendly	Emirates (United Arab Emirates)	2–4	China
		Report	Tang Shi 3'; Liu Ruofan 66'

==== U-21 selection team ====
8 May 2017 Friendly	China	1–3	Uruguay	Shaanxi Province Stadium, Xi'an
19:35 UTC+8	Guo Tianyu 85'

27 June 2017 Friendly	SG Sonnenhof Großaspach (Germany)	1–0	China	Mechatronik Arena, Aspach
18:00 UTC+2

2 July 2017 Friendly	SGV Freiberg (Germany)	3–1	China
			Chen Chunxin 45'

18 November 2017 Friendly	TSV Schott Mainz (Germany)	3–0	China	Bezirkssportanlage Mombach, Mainz
14:00 UTC+1

20 November 2017 Friendly	FC Rot-Weiß Erfurt U-19 (Germany)	1–6	China
		Report

=== China national under-20 football team ===
17 May 2017 Panda Cup	China	1–4	Hungary	Chengdu
19:00 UTC+8				Stadium: Shuangliu Sports Centre Stadium; Referee: Hei Xiaohu

19 May 2017 Panda Cup	China	1–2	Iran	Chengdu
20:00 UTC+8				Stadium: Shuangliu Sports Centre Stadium; Referee: Jin Jingyuan

21 May 2017 Panda Cup	China	0–1	Slovakia	Chengdu
19:00 UTC+8				Stadium: Shuangliu Sports Centre Stadium; Referee: Tang Shunqi

23 July 2017 Luneng Weifang Cup	China	1–1	(Germany) VfL Wolfsburg U-19	Weifang
16:00 UTC+8				Stadium: Weifang Sports Center Stadium; Referee: Yin Lei

24 July 2017 Luneng Weifang Cup	China	1–2	(Japan) FC Tokyo U-19	Weifang
17:00 UTC+8				Stadium: Luneng Football School A1 Stadium; Referee: Xing Qi

26 July 2017 Luneng Weifang Cup	China	1–3	(Brazil) Desportivo Brasil U-19	Weifang
16:00 UTC+8				Stadium: Luneng Football School A1 Stadium; Referee: Yang Nan

27 July 2017 Luneng Weifang Cup Classification 5–8th	China	3–0	(Australia) Newcastle Jets Youth	Weifang
16:00 UTC+8				Stadium: Luneng Football School A3 Stadium; Referee: Dai Yige

29 July 2017 Luneng Weifang Cup Fifth place match	China	2–0	(China) Shandong Luneng Taishan U-19	Weifang
09:00 UTC+8				Stadium: Luneng Football School A4 Stadium; Referee: Wang Hao

24 August 2017 Japan-Korea-China Junior Sports Exchange Meet	Ibaraki U-18 XI (Japan)	1–0	China	Ibaraki

26 August 2017 Japan-Korea-China Junior Sports Exchange Meet	Japan U-18 XI	1–2	China	Ibaraki

27 August 2017 Japan-Korea-China Junior Sports Exchange Meet	South Korea U-18 XI	1–4	China	Ibaraki

20 September 2017 Qujing International Youth Football Tournament	China	2–1	Oman	Qujing
19:30 UTC+8				Stadium: Qujing Cultural and Sports Park Stadium; Referee: Ai Kun

22 September 2017 Qujing International Youth Football Tournament	China	1–0	Tajikistan	Qujing
19:30 UTC+8				Stadium: Qujing Cultural and Sports Park Stadium

24 September 2017 Qujing International Youth Football Tournament	China	1–3	Mexico	Qujing
19:35 UTC+8				Stadium: Qujing Cultural and Sports Park Stadium

24 October 2017 2018 AFC U-19 Championship qualification	Cambodia	0–1	China	Phnom Penh
18:30 UTC+7		Report	Tao Qianglong 90+2'	Stadium: National Olympic Stadium; Attendance: 8,355; Referee: Yudai Yamamoto (Japan)

26 October 2017 2018 AFC U-19 Championship qualification	Philippines	0–6	China	Phnom Penh
15:30 UTC+7			Liu Ruofan 17', 41' (pen.), 45+2'; Yezimujiang 53', 82', 85'	Stadium: National Olympic Stadium; Attendance: 324; Referee: Hasan Akrami (Iran)

28 October 2017 2018 AFC U-19 Championship qualification	China	1–0	Myanmar	Phnom Penh
15:30 UTC+7	Liu Ruofan 38'			Stadium: National Olympic Stadium; Attendance: 7,350; Referee: Yaqoub Al-Hammadi (United Arab Emirates)

18 November 2017 Regionalliga friendly match	TSV Schott Mainz (Germany)	3–0	China	Mainz
14:00 UTC+1				Stadium: Bezirkssportanlage Mombach; Attendance: 400

=== China women's national under-20 football team ===
10 September 2017 Duyun International Women's Youth Football Tournament	China	8–0	Iran	Qiannan Nationwide Fitness Centre Stadium, Duyun
15:00 UTC+8				Referee: Mi Siyu

12 September 2017 Duyun International Women's Youth Football Tournament	China	1–2	United States	Qiannan Nationwide Fitness Centre Stadium, Duyun
19:35 UTC+8				Referee: Yu Hong

14 September 2017 Duyun International Women's Youth Football Tournament	China	1–1	Japan	Qiannan Nationwide Fitness Centre Stadium, Duyun
19:35 UTC+8				Referee: Mi Siyu

15 October 2017 AFC U-19 Women's Championship	China	2–0	Uzbekistan	Jiangning Sports Center, Nanjing
15:00 UTC+8		Report

18 October 2017 AFC U-19 Women's Championship	Thailand	0–2	China	Jiangning Sports Center, Nanjing
15:00 UTC+8		Report

21 October 2017 AFC U-19 Women's Championship	China	0–2	North Korea	Jiangning Sports Center, Nanjing
15:00 UTC+8		Report

25 October 2017 AFC U-19 Women's Championship	Japan	5–0	China	Jiangning Sports Center, Nanjing
19:00 UTC+8		Report

28 October 2017 AFC U-19 Women's Championship	Australia	0–3	China	Jiangning Sports Center, Nanjing
15:00 UTC+8		Report

=== China national under-17 football team ===
==== U-15 ====
24 May 2017 Jiangyin Four Nations Tournament	China	1–1	North Macedonia	Jiangyin Stadium, Jiangyin
19:30 UTC+8				Referee: Ai Kun

26 May 2017 Jiangyin Four Nations Tournament	China	3–0	Kyrgyzstan	Jiangyin Stadium, Jiangyin
16:00 UTC+8				Referee: Huang Yi

28 May 2017 Jiangyin Four Nations Tournament	China	0–1	North Korea	Jiangyin Stadium, Jiangyin
15:00 UTC+8				Referee: Gu Chunhan

13 July 2017 Weinan Four Nations Tournament	China	0–4	Japan	Weinan Sports Center Stadium, Weinan
19:35 UTC+8				Referee: Gu Chunhan

15 July 2017 Weinan Four Nations Tournament	China	0–1	Uzbekistan	Weinan Sports Center Stadium, Weinan
16:00 UTC+8				Referee: Maimaitijiang Aihemaiti

17 July 2017 Weinan Four Nations Tournament	China	1–4	Czech Republic	Weinan Sports Center Stadium, Weinan
19:35 UTC+8				Referee: Zhang Long

20 July 2017	Hong Kong	2–2	China	Macau University of Science and Technology Sports Field, Macau
10:00 UTC+8

22 July 2017	China	4–2	Chinese Taipei	Macau University of Science and Technology Sports Field, Macau
10:00 UTC+8

24 July 2017	Macau	0–7	China	Macau University of Science and Technology Sports Field, Macau
15:30 UTC+8

25 September 2017 2018 AFC U-16 Championship qualification	China	2–1	Myanmar	Thuwunna Stadium, Yangon
18:00 UTC+6:30

27 September 2017 2018 AFC U-16 Championship qualification	Philippines	0–2	China	Thuwunna Stadium, Yangon
15:00 UTC+6:30

29 September 2017 2018 AFC U-16 Championship qualification	South Korea	1–0	China	Thuwunna Stadium, Yangon
15:00 UTC+6:30

==== U-16 ====
12 April 2017 Montaigu Tournament	Cameroon	2–0	China

13 April 2017 Montaigu Tournament	France	3–0	China

15 April 2017 Montaigu Tournament	England	4–0	China

17 April 2017 Montaigu Tournament	Morocco	1–0	China

24 July 2017 Jinshan Youth Tournament	China B	4–0	(China) Shanghai Shenxin U-16

24 July 2017 Jinshan Youth Tournament	China A	0–2	(Czech Republic) SK Slavia Prague U-16

26 July 2017 Jinshan Youth Tournament	China A	0–0	Bahrain

26 July 2017 Jinshan Youth Tournament	China B	5–4	(Spain) Granada CF U-16

28 July 2017 Jinshan Youth Tournament	China A	0–6	(Japan) Yokohama F. Marinos U-16

28 July 2017 Jinshan Youth Tournament	China B	4–1	Western Australia United U-16

29 July 2017 Jinshan Youth Tournament	China B	0–2	(Japan) Yokohama F. Marinos U-16

12 October 2017 Birthplace Cup	China B	0–3	(France) FC Girondins de Bordeaux U-16

12 October 2017 Birthplace Cup	China A	5–2	(Australia) Adelaide United FC U-16

13 October 2017 Birthplace Cup	China A	2–0	China B

14 October 2017 Birthplace Cup	China A	2–1	(France) FC Girondins de Bordeaux U-16

14 October 2017 Birthplace Cup	China B	3–1	(England) Southampton F.C. U-16

16 October 2017 Birthplace Cup	China B	0–1	(Australia) Adelaide United FC U-16

17 October 2017 Birthplace Cup	China A	0–0	(England) Southampton F.C. U-16

=== China women's national under-17 football team ===
12 July 2017 Weifang International Women's Youth Football Tournament	China	3–1	Canada	Weifang Sports Center Stadium, Weifang
19:35 UTC+8				Referee: Mi Siyu

14 July 2017 Weifang International Women's Youth Football Tournament	China	2–2	Japan	Weifang Sports Center Stadium, Weifang
19:35 UTC+8				Referee: Dong Fangyu

16 July 2017 Weifang International Women's Youth Football Tournament	China	5–4	United States	Weifang Sports Center Stadium, Weifang
19:35 UTC+8				Referee: Yu Hong

10 September 2017 2017 AFC U-16 Women's Championship	China	2–2	South Korea	Institute of Physical Education Chonburi Campus Stadium, Chonburi
17:00 UTC+7	Zhang Linyan 11'; Tang Han 90+3'	Report	Hwang Ah-hyeon 59'; Kim Bit-na 68'	Attendance: 95; Referee: Kajiyama Fusako (Japan)

13 September 2017 2017 AFC U-16 Women's Championship	Laos	0–7	China	Institute of Physical Education Chonburi Campus Stadium, Chonburi
17:00 UTC+7		Report	Han Huimin 3'; Li Yinghua 30'; Jin Jing 45+1'; Tang Han 57'; Zhang Linyan 62', 78'; Wang Yumeng 89'	Attendance: 65; Referee: Seinn Cho Aung (Myanmar)

16 September 2017 2017 AFC U-16 Women's Championship	Thailand	1–6	China	Chonburi Stadium, Chonburi
18:00 UTC+7	Ploychompoo 49'	Report	Ou Yiyao 6'; Wararat 30' (o.g.); Yang Qian 36'; Tang Han 56', 69'; Zhang Linyan 57'	Attendance: 250; Referee: Fusako Kajiyama (Japan)

20 September 2017 2017 AFC U-16 Women's Championship	China	0–1	North Korea	Chonburi Stadium, Chonburi
16:00 UTC+7		Report	Ri Su-gyong 58' (pen.)	Attendance: 1,036; Referee: Cong Thi Dung (Vietnam)

23 September 2017 2017 AFC U-16 Women's Championship	China	0–1	Japan	Chonburi Stadium, Chonburi
16:00 UTC+7		Report	Nakao 55'	Attendance: 1,677; Referee: Casey Reibelt (Australia)

== AFC competitions ==
=== 2017 AFC Champions League ===
==== Qualifying play-off ====
===== Play-off round =====
Team 1	Score	Team 2
Shanghai SIPG (China)	3–0	(Thailand) Sukhothai
Shanghai Shenhua (China)	0–2	(Australia) Brisbane Roar

==== Group stage ====
===== Group F =====
Pos	Team	Pld	W	D	L	GF	GA	GD	Pts	Qualification	URA	SSI	SEO	WSW
1	(Japan) Urawa Red Diamonds	6	4	0	2	18	7	+11	12 (Note: Head-to-head results: Shanghai SIPG 3–2 Urawa Red Diamonds, Urawa Red Diamonds 1–0 Shanghai SIPG (Urawa Red Diamonds won on away goals).)	Advance to knockout stage	—	1–0	5–2	6–1
2	(China) Shanghai SIPG	6	4	0	2	15	9	+6	12	Advance to knockout stage	3–2	—	4–2	5–1
3	(South Korea) FC Seoul	6	2	0	4	10	15	−5	6 (Note: Head-to-head results: FC Seoul 2–3 Western Sydney Wanderers, Western Sydney Wanderers 2–3 FC Seoul (tied on head-to-head results, ranked on total goal difference).)		1–0	0–1	—	2–3
4	(Australia) Western Sydney Wanderers	6	2	0	4	10	22	−12	6		0–4	3–2	2–3	—

Source: AFC

===== Group G =====
Pos	Team	Pld	W	D	L	GF	GA	GD	Pts	Qualification	KAW	GZE	SSB	EAS
1	(Japan) Kawasaki Frontale	6	2	4	0	8	3	+5	10 (Note: Head-to-head results: Guangzhou Evergrande 1–1 Kawasaki Frontale, Kawasaki Frontale 0–0 Guangzhou Evergrande (Kawasaki Frontale won on away goals).)	Advance to knockout stage	—	0–0	1–1	4–0
2	(China) Guangzhou Evergrande	6	2	4	0	18	5	+13	10	Advance to knockout stage	1–1	—	2–2	7–0
3	(South Korea) Suwon Samsung Bluewings	6	2	3	1	11	6	+5	9		0–1	2–2	—	5–0
4	(Hong Kong) Eastern	6	0	1	5	1	24	−23	1		1–1	0–6	0–1	—

Source: AFC

===== Group H =====
Pos	Team	Pld	W	D	L	GF	GA	GD	Pts	Qualification	JIA	JEJ	ADE	GAM
1	(China) Jiangsu Suning	6	5	0	1	9	3	+6	15	Advance to knockout stage	—	1–2	2–1	3–0
2	(South Korea) Jeju United	6	3	1	2	12	9	+3	10	Advance to knockout stage	0–1	—	1–3	2–0
3	(Australia) Adelaide United	6	1	2	3	10	13	−3	5		0–1	3–3	—	0–3
4	(Japan) Gamba Osaka	6	1	1	4	7	13	−6	4		0–1	1–4	3–3	—

Source: AFC

==== Knockout stage ====
===== Round of 16 =====
Team 1	Agg.	Team 2	1st leg	2nd leg
Guangzhou Evergrande (China)	2–2 (a)	(Japan) Kashima Antlers	1–0	1–2
Shanghai SIPG (China)	5–3	(China) Jiangsu Suning	2–1	3–2

===== Quarter-finals =====
Team 1	Agg.	Team 2	1st leg	2nd leg
Shanghai SIPG (China)	5–5 (5–4 p)	(China) Guangzhou Evergrande	4–0	1–5 (a.e.t.)

===== Semi-finals =====
Team 1	Agg.	Team 2	1st leg	2nd leg
Shanghai SIPG (China)	1–2	(Japan) Urawa Red Diamonds	1–1	0–1

== Men's football ==
=== League season ===
Location of teams in 2017 China Football Leagues
Chinese Super League
China League One
China League Two
Beijing teams
Shanghai teams

==== Chinese Super League ====
Pos	Team	Pld	W	D	L	GF	GA	GD	Pts	Qualification or relegation
1	Guangzhou Evergrande Taobao (C)	30	20	4	6	69	42	+27	64	Qualification to Champions League group stage
2	Shanghai SIPG	30	17	7	6	72	39	+33	58	Qualification to Champions League play-off round
3	Tianjin Quanjian	30	15	9	6	46	33	+13	54	Qualification to Champions League play-off round
4	Hebei China Fortune	30	15	7	8	55	38	+17	52	
5	Guangzhou R&F	30	15	7	8	59	46	+13	52	
6	Shandong Luneng Taishan	30	13	10	7	49	33	+16	49	
7	Changchun Yatai	30	12	8	10	46	41	+5	44	
8	Guizhou Hengfeng Zhicheng	30	12	6	12	39	45	−6	42	
9	Beijing Sinobo Guoan	30	11	7	12	42	42	0	40	
10	Chongqing Dangdai Lifan	30	9	9	12	37	40	−3	36	
11	Shanghai Greenland Shenhua (Note: Shanghai Greenland Shenhua qualified for the 2018 AFC Champions League group stage as 2017 Chinese FA Cup winners.)	30	9	8	13	52	55	−3	35	Qualification to Champions League group stage
12	Jiangsu Suning	30	7	11	12	40	45	−5	32	
13	Tianjin TEDA	30	8	7	15	30	49	−19	31	
14	Henan Jianye	30	7	9	14	34	46	−12	30	
15	Yanbian Funde (R)	30	5	7	18	32	64	−32	22	Relegation to League One
16	Liaoning Whowin (R)	30	4	6	20	30	74	−44	18	Relegation to League One

Source: League table
Rules for classification: 1) Points; 2) Head-to-head points; 3) Head-to-head goal difference; 4) Head-to-head goals scored; 5) Reserve league points; 6) Goal difference; 7) Goals scored; 8) Disciplinary points (1 point for each yellow card, 3 points for each red card); 9) Draw
(C) Champions; (R) Relegated

==== China League One ====
Pos	Team	Pld	W	D	L	GF	GA	GD	Pts	Promotion, qualification or relegation
1	Dalian Yifang (C, P)	30	19	7	4	48	23	+25	64	Promotion to Super League
2	Beijing Renhe (P)	30	18	8	4	48	21	+27	62	Promotion to Super League
3	Shijiazhuang Ever Bright	30	14	12	4	48	34	+14	54	
4	Qingdao Huanghai	30	16	4	10	56	40	+16	52	
5	Wuhan Zall	30	13	8	9	47	40	+7	47	
6	Shenzhen F.C.	30	13	7	10	56	37	+19	46	
7	Shanghai Shenxin	30	10	10	10	53	42	+11	40	
8	Beijing Enterprises Group	30	11	4	15	43	50	−7	37	
9	Hangzhou Greentown	30	8	12	10	31	39	−8	36	
10	Nei Mongol Zhongyou	30	9	8	13	40	47	−7	35	
11	Xinjiang Tianshan Leopard	30	9	8	13	37	52	−15	35	
12	Meizhou Hakka	30	8	9	13	33	39	−6	33	
13	Zhejiang Yiteng	30	8	8	14	35	46	−11	32	
14	Dalian Transcendence	30	8	7	15	34	58	−24	31	
15	Baoding Yingli ETS (R)	30	8	7	15	41	51	−10	31	Relegation to League Two
16	Yunnan Lijiang (R)	30	4	9	17	31	62	−31	21	Relegation to League Two

Updated to match(es) played on 28 October 2017. Source: League table
Rules for classification: 1) Points; 2) Head-to-head points; 3) Head-to-head goal difference; 4) Head-to-head goals scored; 5) Reserve league points; 6) Goal difference; 7) Goals scored; 8) Disciplinary points (1 point for each yellow card, 3 points for each red card); 9) Draw
(C) Champions; (P) Promoted; (R) Relegated

==== China League Two ====
===== North Group =====
Pos	Team	Pld	W	D	L	GF	GA	GD	Pts	Promotion or relegation
1	Yinchuan Helanshan (Q)	22	14	3	5	34	14	+20	45	Qualification to Play-offs
2	Qingdao Jonoon (Q)	22	12	8	2	27	8	+19	44	Qualification to Play-offs
3	Heilongjiang Lava Spring (Q, C, P)	22	12	7	3	36	14	+22	43	Qualification to Play-offs
4	Shaanxi Chang'an Athletic (Q)	22	12	6	4	26	14	+12	42	Qualification to Play-offs
5	Hebei Elite	22	13	3	6	41	24	+17	42	9th–20th place Play-offs
6	Shenyang Urban	22	11	6	5	25	15	+10	39	9th–20th place Play-offs
7	Jiangsu Yancheng Dingli	22	6	7	9	21	30	−9	25	9th–20th place Play-offs
8	Beijing BIT	22	5	8	9	25	30	−5	23	9th–20th place Play-offs
9	Dalian Boyoung	22	4	8	10	19	31	−12	20	9th–20th place Play-offs
10	Jilin Baijia	22	3	10	9	15	28	−13	19	9th–20th place Play-offs
11	Shenyang Dongjin	22	1	7	14	11	34	−23	10	21st–24th place Play-offs
12	Baotou Nanjiao	22	2	1	19	14	52	−38	7	21st–24th place Play-offs

Updated to match(es) played on September 24, 2017. Source: fa.org.cn
Rules for classification: 1) Points; 2) Head-to-head points; 3) Head-to-head goal difference; 4) Head-to-head goals scored; 5) Goal difference; 6) Goals scored; 7) Disciplinary points (1 point for each yellow card, 3 points for each red card)
(C) Champions; (P) Promoted; (Q) Qualified for the phase indicated

===== South Group =====
Pos	Team	Pld	W	D	L	GF	GA	GD	Pts	Promotion or relegation
1	Shenzhen Ledman (Q)	22	16	4	2	49	12	+37	52	Qualification to Play-offs
2	Sichuan Longfor (Q)	22	14	5	3	37	16	+21	47	Qualification to Play-offs
3	Meizhou Meixian Techand (Q, P)	22	12	3	7	33	21	+12	39	Qualification to Play-offs
4	Nantong Zhiyun (Q)	22	11	5	6	22	15	+7	38	Qualification to Play-offs
5	Chengdu Qbao	22	9	8	5	22	18	+4	35	9th–20th place Play-offs
6	Suzhou Dongwu	22	10	5	7	24	15	+9	35	9th–20th place Play-offs
7	Jiangxi Liansheng	22	9	7	6	23	20	+3	34	9th–20th place Play-offs
8	Hunan Billows	22	8	4	10	28	28	0	28	9th–20th place Play-offs
9	Shanghai Sunfun	22	5	4	13	21	45	−24	19	9th–20th place Play-offs
10	Shanghai JuJu Sports	22	4	6	12	17	35	−18	18	9th–20th place Play-offs
11	Hainan Boying (O)	22	5	2	15	13	33	−20	17	21st–24th place Play-offs
12	Zhenjiang Huasa (O)	22	0	5	17	18	49	−31	5	21st–24th place Play-offs

Updated to match(es) played on September 24, 2017. Source: fa.org.cn
Rules for classification: 1) Points; 2) Head-to-head points; 3) Head-to-head goal difference; 4) Head-to-head goals scored; 5) Goal difference; 6) Goals scored; 7) Disciplinary points (1 point for each yellow card, 3 points for each red card)
(O) Play-off winners; (P) Promoted; (Q) Qualified for the phase indicated

=== Cup competitions ===
==== Chinese FA Super Cup ====
25 February 2017
20:00 UTC+8

Guangzhou Evergrande Taobao	1–0	Jiangsu Suning
Alan 35'

Olympic Sports Center, Chongqing
Attendance: 49,560
Referee: Wang Di

== Women's Football ==
=== League season ===
==== Chinese Women's Super League ====
League table

Pos	Team	Pld	W	D	L	GF	GA	GD	Pts	Relegation
1	Dalian Quanjian (C)	14	10	2	2	40	11	+29	32	
2	Changchun Rural Commercial Bank	14	9	2	3	26	9	+17	29	
3	Jiangsu Suning	14	8	3	3	32	14	+18	27	
4	Shanghai WFC	14	8	1	5	27	24	+3	25	
5	Tianjin Huisen	14	5	3	6	14	18	−4	18	
6	Beijing Enterprise Phoenix	14	3	3	8	10	34	−24	12	
7	Hebei China Fortune	14	1	4	9	11	32	−21	7	Super League Relegation Playoff
8	Shandong Sports Lottery (R)	14	1	4	9	10	28	−18	7	Relegated to League One

==== China Women's League One ====
League table

Pos	Team	Pld	W	D	L	GF	GA	GD	Pts	Promotion
1	Wuhan Jianghan University (C)(P)	14	10	2	2	40	10	+30	32	Promoted to Super League
2	Henan Huishang	14	9	1	4	33	11	+22	28	Super League Relegation Playoffs
3	Zhejiang Lander	14	8	1	5	35	17	+18	25	
4	Guangdong Suoka	14	7	2	5	27	18	+9	23	
5	PLA	14	5	3	6	26	16	+10	18	
6	Sichuan WFC	14	5	3	6	19	18	+1	18	
7	Shaanxi WFC	14	4	4	6	11	15	−4	16	
8	Nei Mongol Hengjun Beilian	14	0	0	14	1	87	−86	0	

==== Chinese Women's Super League Relegation Playoff ====
5 November 2017
16:00 UTC+8

Hebei China Fortune	3–3	Henan Huishang
Cui Xingchen 7'; Zang Wei 59', 79'		Cui Yazhen 55'; Lou Jiahui 74', 82'
Penalties
	1–4

=== Cup competitions ===
==== Chinese Women's Football Championship ====
===== Final =====
1 March 2017
15:00 UTC+8

Shanghai WFC	2–0	Changchun Rural Commercial Bank
Xiao Yuyi 42'; Yang Lina 84'

Haigeng Training Base, Kunming

==== Chinese FA Women's Cup ====
===== Final =====
21 June 2017
17:00 UTC+8

Jiangsu Suning	0–0 (a.e.t.)	Changchun Rural Commercial Bank
Penalties
Ni Mengjie (penalty scored); Wu Min (penalty missed); Wang Lisi (penalty scored); Herlovsen (penalty scored)	3–1	(penalty scored) Zhang Rui; (penalty missed) Ren Guixin; (penalty missed) Rafaelle; (penalty missed) Mei Xue

Weifang Sports Center Stadium, Weifang

==== Chinese FA Women's Super Cup ====
7 November 2017
14:00 UTC+8

Dalian Quanjian	5–3	Shanghai
Liu Jieru 2' (o.g.); Oshoala 19', 40'; Ma Xiaoxu 52'; Wang Shuang 80'		Xiao Yuyi 8'; Miao Siwen 57' (pen.); Tang Jiali 83'

Wuhan Sports Center Stadium, Wuhan
Referee: Mi Siyu
