= 2017 AFC Champions League group stage =

Football tournament group stage

The 2017 AFC Champions League group stage was played from 20 February to 10 May 2017. A total of 32 teams competed in the group stage to decide the 16 places in the knockout stage of the 2017 AFC Champions League.

== Draw ==
The draw for the group stage was held on 13 December 2016, 16:00 MYT (UTC+8), at the Hilton Petaling Jaya in Petaling Jaya, Malaysia. The 32 teams were drawn into eight groups of four: four groups each in the West Region (Groups A–D) and the East Region (Groups E–H). Teams from the same association could not be drawn into the same group.

The seeding of each team in the draw was determined by their association and their qualifying position within their association. The mechanism of the draw was as follows:

- For the West Region, a draw was held for the three associations with three direct entrants (United Arab Emirates, Saudi Arabia, Iran) to determine the seeds 1 placed in order for Groups A, B and C. The remaining teams were then allocated to the groups according to the rules set by AFC.
- For the East Region, a draw was held for the two associations with three direct entrants (South Korea, Japan) to determine the seeds 1 placed in order for Groups E and F. The remaining teams were then allocated to the groups according to the rules set by AFC.

The following 32 teams entered into the group stage draw, which included the 24 direct entrants and the eight winners of the play-off round of the qualifying play-offs, whose identity were not known at the time of the draw.

Region	Groups	Seed 1	Seed 2	Seed 3	Seed 4
West Region	A–D	(United Arab Emirates) Al-Ahli	(United Arab Emirates) Al-Jazira	(United Arab Emirates) Al-Ain	(United Arab Emirates) Al-Wahda (Play-off West 1)
West Region	A–D	(Saudi Arabia) Al-Ahli	(Saudi Arabia) Al-Hilal	(Saudi Arabia) Al-Taawoun	(Saudi Arabia) Al-Fateh (Play-off West 2)
West Region	A–D	(Iran) Esteghlal Khuzestan	(Iran) Zob Ahan	(Iran) Persepolis	(Iran) Esteghlal (Play-off West 3)
West Region	A–D	(Qatar) Al-Rayyan (Note: The seeding of the first and second group stage teams from Qatar and the first group stage team Uzbekistan were determined by draw.)	(Uzbekistan) Lokomotiv Tashkent	(Qatar) Lekhwiya	(Uzbekistan) Bunyodkor (Play-off West 4)
East Region	E–H	(South Korea) FC Seoul	(South Korea) Suwon Samsung Bluewings	~~(South Korea) Jeonbuk Hyundai Motors~~ (South Korea) Jeju United (Note: On 18 January 2017, Jeonbuk Hyundai Motors were excluded from the 2017 AFC Champions League due to a bribery scandal in the domestic K League Classic. As a result, Jeju United entered the group stage instead of the qualifying play-offs to replace them.)	(South Korea) Ulsan Hyundai (Play-off East 1)
East Region	E–H	(Japan) Kashima Antlers	(Japan) Urawa Red Diamonds (Note: The identity of the second and third group stage teams from Japan were not known at the time of the draw.)	(Japan) Kawasaki Frontale	(Japan) Gamba Osaka (Play-off East 2)
East Region	E–H	(China) Guangzhou Evergrande	(China) Jiangsu Suning	(Australia) Brisbane Roar (Play-off East 4)	(China) Shanghai SIPG (Play-off East 3)
East Region	E–H	(Australia) Adelaide United	(Thailand) Muangthong United (Note: The seeding of the first group stage teams from Thailand and Hong Kong were determined by draw.)	(Australia) Western Sydney Wanderers	(Hong Kong) Eastern

== Format ==
In the group stage, each group was played on a home-and-away round-robin basis. The winners and runners-up of each group advanced to the round of 16 of the knockout stage.

=== Tiebreakers ===
The teams were ranked according to points (3 points for a win, 1 point for a draw, 0 points for a loss). If tied on points, tiebreakers were applied in the following order (Regulations Article 10.5):

1. Points in head-to-head matches among tied teams;
2. Goal difference in head-to-head matches among tied teams;
3. Goals scored in head-to-head matches among tied teams;
4. Away goals scored in head-to-head matches among tied teams;
5. If more than two teams are tied, and after applying all head-to-head criteria above, a subset of teams are still tied, all head-to-head criteria above are reapplied exclusively to this subset of teams;
6. Goal difference in all group matches;
7. Goals scored in all group matches;
8. Penalty shoot-out if only two teams are tied and they met in the last round of the group;
9. Disciplinary points (yellow card = 1 point, red card as a result of two yellow cards = 3 points, direct red card = 3 points, yellow card followed by direct red card = 4 points);
10. Team from the higher-ranked association.

== Schedule ==
The schedule of each matchday was as follows. Matches in the West Region were played on Mondays and Tuesdays, while matches in the East Region were played on Tuesdays and Wednesdays.

Matchday	Dates	Matches
Matchday 1	20–22 February 2017	Team 1 vs. Team 4, Team 3 vs. Team 2
Matchday 2	27 February – 1 March 2017	Team 4 vs. Team 3, Team 2 vs. Team 1
Matchday 3	13–15 March 2017	Team 4 vs. Team 2, Team 1 vs. Team 3
Matchday 4	10–12 April 2017	Team 2 vs. Team 4, Team 3 vs. Team 1
Matchday 5	24–26 April 2017	Team 4 vs. Team 1, Team 2 vs. Team 3
Matchday 6	8–10 May 2017	Team 1 vs. Team 2, Team 3 vs. Team 4

== Groups ==
=== Group A ===
Pos	Team	Pld	W	D	L	GF	GA	GD	Pts	Qualification	AHL	EST	TAA	LOK
1	(United Arab Emirates) Al-Ahli	6	3	2	1	10	5	+5	11 (Note: Head-to-head results: Al-Ahli 2–1 Esteghlal, Esteghlal 1–1 Al-Ahli.)	Advance to knockout stage	—	2–1	0–0	4–0
2	(Iran) Esteghlal	6	3	2	1	10	5	+5	11	Advance to knockout stage	1–1	—	3–0	2–0
3	(Saudi Arabia) Al-Taawoun	6	1	2	3	7	12	−5	5 (Note: Head-to-head results: Al-Taawoun 1–0 Lokomotiv Tashkent, Lokomotiv Tashkent 4–4 Al-Taawoun.)		1–3	1–2	—	1–0
4	(Uzbekistan) Lokomotiv Tashkent	6	1	2	3	7	12	−5	5		2–0	1–1	4–4	—

Source: AFC
Rules for classification: Group stage tiebreakers
Notes:
20 February 2017
18:40 UTC+3

Al-Taawoun (Saudi Arabia)	1–0	(Uzbekistan) Lokomotiv Tashkent
Al-Absi 67'	Report

King Abdullah Sport City Stadium, Buraidah
Attendance: 25,879
Referee: Ahmed Al-Kaf (Oman)
20 February 2017
20:15 UTC+4

Al-Ahli (United Arab Emirates)	2–1	(Iran) Esteghlal
Diop 45+1', 90'	Report	Ebrahimi 74'

Al-Rashid Stadium, Dubai
Attendance: 5,300
Referee: Peter Green (Australia)

27 February 2017
16:00 UTC+5

Lokomotiv Tashkent (Uzbekistan)	2–0	(United Arab Emirates) Al-Ahli
Kutibaev 1'; Bikmaev 57'	Report

Lokomotiv Stadium, Tashkent
Attendance: 4,000
Referee: Fu Ming (China)
27 February 2017
19:30 UTC+4

Esteghlal (Iran)	3–0	(Saudi Arabia) Al-Taawoun
Rezaei 1'; M. Karimi 70'; Padovani 89'	Report

Sultan Qaboos Sports Complex, Muscat (Oman) (Note: Matches between teams from Iran and Saudi Arabia were played on neutral venues due to deterioration of Iran–Saudi Arabia relations.)
Attendance: 1,050
Referee: Hiroyuki Kimura (Japan)

13 March 2017
19:00 UTC+3:30

Esteghlal (Iran)	2–0	(Uzbekistan) Lokomotiv Tashkent
Esmaeili 37'; Ghorbani 84'	Report

Azadi Stadium, Tehran
Attendance: 42,369
Referee: Kim Jong-hyeok (South Korea)
13 March 2017
20:30 UTC+4

Al-Ahli (United Arab Emirates)	0–0	(Saudi Arabia) Al-Taawoun
	Report

Al-Rashid Stadium, Dubai
Attendance: 2,335
Referee: Mohanad Qasim Eesee Sarray (Iraq)

11 April 2017
16:00 UTC+5

Lokomotiv Tashkent (Uzbekistan)	1–1	(Iran) Esteghlal
Bikmaev 13'	Report	Rezaei 87'

Lokomotiv Stadium, Tashkent
Attendance: 3,327
Referee: Adham Makhadmeh (Jordan)
11 April 2017
19:05 UTC+3

Al-Taawoun (Saudi Arabia)	1–3	(United Arab Emirates) Al-Ahli
N'Diaye 63' (pen.)	Report	Diop 37', 59'; Everton 45'

King Abdullah Sport City Stadium, Buraidah
Attendance: 16,135
Referee: Liu Kwok Man (Hong Kong)

25 April 2017
17:00 UTC+5

Lokomotiv Tashkent (Uzbekistan)	4–4	(Saudi Arabia) Al-Taawoun
Bikmaev 20', 32' (pen.), 47'; Masharipov 81'	Report	Al-Sawat 18'; Al-Hussain 65'; N'Diaye 69'; Machado 90+1'

Lokomotiv Stadium, Tashkent
Attendance: 3,155
Referee: Abdulrahman Al-Jassim (Qatar)
25 April 2017
20:15 UTC+4:30

Esteghlal (Iran)	1–1	(United Arab Emirates) Al-Ahli
Rezaei 58'	Report	Sanqour 17'

Azadi Stadium, Tehran
Attendance: 76,428
Referee: Jumpei Iida (Japan)

9 May 2017
19:50 UTC+4

Al-Ahli (United Arab Emirates)	4–0	(Uzbekistan) Lokomotiv Tashkent
Khamis 28'; Al Hammadi 59'; Gyan 72'; Ribeiro 77'	Report

Al-Rashid Stadium, Dubai
Attendance: 1,416
Referee: Ali Abdulnabi (Bahrain)
9 May 2017
18:50 UTC+3

Al-Taawoun (Saudi Arabia)	1–2	(Iran) Esteghlal
Al-Saiari 36'	Report	Ansari 19'; Rezaei 76'

Hamad bin Khalifa Stadium, Doha (Qatar)
Attendance: 375
Referee: Hettikamkanamge Perera (Sri Lanka)

=== Group B ===
Pos	Team	Pld	W	D	L	GF	GA	GD	Pts	Qualification	LEK	ESK	FAT	JAZ
1	(Qatar) Lekhwiya	6	4	2	0	15	6	+9	14	Advance to knockout stage	—	2–1	4–1	3–0
2	(Iran) Esteghlal Khuzestan	6	2	3	1	6	5	+1	9	Advance to knockout stage	1–1	—	1–0	1–1
3	(Saudi Arabia) Al-Fateh	6	1	3	2	7	9	−2	6		2–2	1–1	—	3–1
4	(United Arab Emirates) Al-Jazira	6	0	2	4	3	11	−8	2		1–3	0–1	0–0	—

Source: AFC
Rules for classification: Group stage tiebreakers
20 February 2017
15:00 UTC+4

Esteghlal Khuzestan (Iran)	1–0	(Saudi Arabia) Al-Fateh
Alaei 80'	Report

Sultan Qaboos Sports Complex, Muscat (Oman)
Attendance: 300
Referee: Mohanad Qasim Eesee Sarray (Iraq)
20 February 2017
16:50 UTC+3

Lekhwiya (Qatar)	3–0	(United Arab Emirates) Al-Jazira
El-Arabi 11', 90'; Msakni 80'	Report

Abdullah bin Khalifa Stadium, Doha
Attendance: 2,836
Referee: Kim Jong-hyeok (South Korea)

27 February 2017
18:10 UTC+3

Al-Fateh (Saudi Arabia)	2–2	(Qatar) Lekhwiya
Nathan Júnior 40' (pen.); Al-Bishi 56'	Report	El-Arabi 18'; Nam Tae-hee 86'

Prince Abdullah bin Jalawi Stadium, Al-Hasa
Attendance: 7,141
Referee: Jumpei Iida (Japan)
27 February 2017
19:30 UTC+4

Al-Jazira (United Arab Emirates)	0–1	(Iran) Esteghlal Khuzestan
	Report	Nong 2'

Mohammed Bin Zayed Stadium, Abu Dhabi
Attendance: 2,322
Referee: Adham Makhadmeh (Jordan)

14 March 2017
17:00 UTC+3:30

Esteghlal Khuzestan (Iran)	1–1	(Qatar) Lekhwiya
Beyt Saeed 8' (pen.)	Report	Mohammad 11'

Ghadir Stadium, Ahvaz
Attendance: 16,600
Referee: Ma Ning (China)
14 March 2017
18:20 UTC+3

Al-Fateh (Saudi Arabia)	3–1	(United Arab Emirates) Al-Jazira
Al-Zaqaan 12', 51'; Al-Juahaim 45+1'	Report	Mabkhout 38'

Prince Abdullah bin Jalawi Stadium, Al-Hasa
Attendance: 4,514
Referee: Hettikamkanamge Perera (Sri Lanka)

10 April 2017
18:30 UTC+3

Lekhwiya (Qatar)	2–1	(Iran) Esteghlal Khuzestan
Nam Tae-hee 35'; Ali 43'	Report	Nong 9'

Abdullah bin Khalifa Stadium, Doha
Attendance: 2,506
Referee: Ahmed Al-Kaf (Oman)
10 April 2017
19:45 UTC+4

Al-Jazira (United Arab Emirates)	0–0	(Saudi Arabia) Al-Fateh
	Report

Mohammed Bin Zayed Stadium, Abu Dhabi
Attendance: 322
Referee: Fu Ming (China)

25 April 2017
18:30 UTC+3

Al-Fateh (Saudi Arabia)	1–1	(Iran) Esteghlal Khuzestan
Al-Zaqaan 85'	Report	Bahrani 90+1'

Thani bin Jassim Stadium, Al Rayyan (Qatar)
Attendance: 467
Referee: Ali Abdulnabi (Bahrain)
25 April 2017
20:00 UTC+4

Al-Jazira (United Arab Emirates)	1–3	(Qatar) Lekhwiya
Boussoufa 18' (pen.)	Report	Nam Tae-hee 27' (pen.), 62'; Msakni 77'

Mohammed Bin Zayed Stadium, Abu Dhabi
Attendance: 36
Referee: Ali Sabah (Iraq)

9 May 2017
20:00 UTC+4:30

Esteghlal Khuzestan (Iran)	1–1	(United Arab Emirates) Al-Jazira
Zobeydi 86'	Report	Al Hammadi 44'

Ghadir Stadium, Ahvaz
Attendance: 10,060
Referee: Ko Hyung-jin (South Korea)
9 May 2017
18:30 UTC+3

Lekhwiya (Qatar)	4–1	(Saudi Arabia) Al-Fateh
Musa 9'; Msakni 20'; Afif 27'; Chico 45+1'	Report	Chico 87' (o.g.)

Abdullah bin Khalifa Stadium, Doha
Attendance: 747
Referee: Adham Makhadmeh (Jordan)

=== Group C ===
Pos	Team	Pld	W	D	L	GF	GA	GD	Pts	Qualification	AIN	AHL	ZOB	BUN
1	(United Arab Emirates) Al-Ain	6	3	3	0	14	7	+7	12	Advance to knockout stage	—	2–2	1–1	3–0
2	(Saudi Arabia) Al-Ahli	6	3	2	1	10	7	+3	11	Advance to knockout stage	2–2	—	2–0	2–0
3	(Iran) Zob Ahan	6	2	1	3	6	9	−3	7		0–3	1–2	—	2–1
4	(Uzbekistan) Bunyodkor	6	1	0	5	5	12	−7	3		2–3	2–0	0–2	—

Source: AFC
Rules for classification: Group stage tiebreakers
21 February 2017
19:15 UTC+4

Al-Ain (United Arab Emirates)	1–1	(Iran) Zob Ahan
Ismail 76'	Report	Bengtson 57'

Hazza Bin Zayed Stadium, Al Ain
Attendance: 8,122
Referee: Ali Sabah (Iraq)
21 February 2017
20:15 UTC+3

Al-Ahli (Saudi Arabia)	2–0	(Uzbekistan) Bunyodkor
Al Somah 13'; Al-Moasher 53'	Report

King Abdullah Sports City, Jeddah
Attendance: 11,315
Referee: Ryuji Sato (Japan)

28 February 2017
18:00 UTC+5

Bunyodkor (Uzbekistan)	2–3	(United Arab Emirates) Al-Ain
Cemîrtan 10'; Khamdamov 43'	Report	O. Abdulrahman 8', 89' (pen.); Caio 15'

Bunyodkor Stadium, Tashkent
Attendance: 4,339
Referee: Jarred Gillett (Australia)
28 February 2017
19:15 UTC+4

Zob Ahan (Iran)	1–2	(Saudi Arabia) Al-Ahli
Rajabzadeh 45+2' (pen.)	Report	Asiri 29'; Al Somah 86'

Sultan Qaboos Sports Complex, Muscat (Oman)
Attendance: 7,000
Referee: Ko Hyung-jin (South Korea)

13 March 2017
18:00 UTC+5

Bunyodkor (Uzbekistan)	0–2	(Iran) Zob Ahan
	Report	Bengtson 55'; Tabrizi 90+4' (pen.)

Bunyodkor Stadium, Tashkent
Attendance: 2,507
Referee: Fahad Al-Marri (Qatar)
13 March 2017
20:30 UTC+3

Al-Ahli (Saudi Arabia)	2–2	(United Arab Emirates) Al-Ain
Balghaith 26'; Fetfatzidis 50'	Report	Al-Shamrani 28'; Balghaith 52' (o.g.)

King Abdullah Sports City, Jeddah
Attendance: 23,431
Referee: Adham Makhadmeh (Jordan)

11 April 2017
20:00 UTC+4:30

Zob Ahan (Iran)	2–1	(Uzbekistan) Bunyodkor
Mohammadzadeh 5'; Tabrizi 54'	Report	Nurmatov 72'

Foolad Shahr Stadium, Isfahan
Attendance: 3,833
Referee: Muhammad Taqi (Singapore)
11 April 2017
19:35 UTC+4

Al-Ain (United Arab Emirates)	2–2	(Saudi Arabia) Al-Ahli
Ismael 7'; O. Abdulrahman 85' (pen.)	Report	Al Somah 43', 89'

Hazza Bin Zayed Stadium, Al Ain
Attendance: 9,224
Referee: Ali Sabah (Iraq)

24 April 2017
19:00 UTC+5

Bunyodkor (Uzbekistan)	2–0	(Saudi Arabia) Al-Ahli
Komilov 8'; Shomurodov 54'	Report

Bunyodkor Stadium, Tashkent
Attendance: 1,307
Referee: Fu Ming (China)
24 April 2017
20:30 UTC+4:30

Zob Ahan (Iran)	0–3	(United Arab Emirates) Al-Ain
	Report	Asprilla 25'; O. Abdulrahman 59'; M. Abdulrahman 80'

Foolad Shahr Stadium, Isfahan
Attendance: 6,321
Referee: Hettikamkanamge Perera (Sri Lanka)

8 May 2017
18:40 UTC+3

Al-Ahli (Saudi Arabia)	2–0	(Iran) Zob Ahan
Asiri 63'; Kurdi 84'	Report

Thani bin Jassim Stadium, Al Rayyan (Qatar)
Attendance: 260
Referee: Ryuji Sato (Japan)
8 May 2017
19:40 UTC+4

Al-Ain (United Arab Emirates)	3–0	(Uzbekistan) Bunyodkor
Al-Shamrani 34'; O. Abdulrahman 76'; Diaky 90+1'	Report

Hazza Bin Zayed Stadium, Al Ain
Attendance: 6,244
Referee: Khamis Al-Marri (Qatar)

=== Group D ===
Pos	Team	Pld	W	D	L	GF	GA	GD	Pts	Qualification	HIL	PER	RAY	WAH
1	(Saudi Arabia) Al-Hilal	6	3	3	0	10	7	+3	12	Advance to knockout stage	—	0–0	2–1	1–0
2	(Iran) Persepolis	6	2	3	1	9	8	+1	9	Advance to knockout stage	1–1	—	0–0	4–2
3	(Qatar) Al-Rayyan	6	2	1	3	10	13	−3	7		3–4	3–1	—	2–1
4	(United Arab Emirates) Al-Wahda	6	1	1	4	12	13	−1	4		2–2	2–3	5–1	—

Source: AFC
Rules for classification: Group stage tiebreakers
21 February 2017
19:00 UTC+4

Persepolis (Iran)	1–1	(Saudi Arabia) Al-Hilal
Mosalman 68'	Report	Carlos Eduardo 82'

Sultan Qaboos Sports Complex, Muscat (Oman)
Attendance: 13,715
Referee: Hettikamkanamge Perera (Sri Lanka)
21 February 2017
18:15 UTC+3

Al-Rayyan (Qatar)	2–1	(United Arab Emirates) Al-Wahda
Viera 13'; Cáceres 60'	Report	Rim Chang-woo 35'

Jassim bin Hamad Stadium, Al Rayyan
Attendance: 6,967
Referee: Valentin Kovalenko (Uzbekistan)

28 February 2017
19:10 UTC+4

Al-Wahda (United Arab Emirates)	2–3	(Iran) Persepolis
Matar 58'; Valdivia 64'	Report	Amiri 4'; Taremi 80', 90'

Al Nahyan Stadium, Abu Dhabi
Attendance: 7,655
Referee: Muhammad Taqi (Singapore)
28 February 2017
19:45 UTC+3

Al-Hilal (Saudi Arabia)	2–1	(Qatar) Al-Rayyan
Carlos Eduardo 4'; Al-Shalhoub 90+4' (pen.)	Report	Tabata 79'

Prince Faisal bin Fahd Stadium, Riyadh
Attendance: 12,208
Referee: Chris Beath (Australia)

14 March 2017
19:15 UTC+4

Al-Wahda (United Arab Emirates)	2–2	(Saudi Arabia) Al-Hilal
Tagliabué 45+1'; Dzsudzsák 55'	Report	Al Abed 5'; Kharbin 69'

Al Nahyan Stadium, Abu Dhabi
Attendance: 5,853
Referee: Ryuji Sato (Japan)
14 March 2017
18:25 UTC+3

Al-Rayyan (Qatar)	3–1	(Iran) Persepolis
Tabata 19', 58' (pen.); García 88'	Report	Taremi 6'

Jassim bin Hamad Stadium, Al Rayyan
Attendance: 4,170
Referee: Fu Ming (China)

10 April 2017
19:00 UTC+4:30

Persepolis (Iran)	0–0	(Qatar) Al-Rayyan
	Report

Azadi Stadium, Tehran
Attendance: 57,130
Referee: Ryuji Sato (Japan)
10 April 2017
20:00 UTC+3

Al-Hilal (Saudi Arabia)	1–0	(United Arab Emirates) Al-Wahda
Carlos Eduardo 24' (pen.)	Report

Prince Faisal bin Fahd Stadium, Riyadh
Attendance: 6,721
Referee: Kim Jong-hyeok (South Korea)

24 April 2017
19:00 UTC+4

Al-Hilal (Saudi Arabia)	0–0	(Iran) Persepolis
	Report

Sultan Qaboos Sports Complex, Muscat (Oman)
Attendance: 10,177
Referee: Mohanad Qasim Eesee Sarray (Iraq)
24 April 2017
19:35 UTC+4

Al-Wahda (United Arab Emirates)	5–1	(Qatar) Al-Rayyan
Al-Akbari 34'; Dzsudzsák 43'; Sultan 52'; Tagliabué 72'; Ibrahim 87'	Report	García 21'

Al Nahyan Stadium, Abu Dhabi
Attendance: 936
Referee: Adham Makhadmeh (Jordan)

8 May 2017
18:25 UTC+3

Al-Rayyan (Qatar)	3–4	(Saudi Arabia) Al-Hilal
Soria 55'; Tabata 59'; García 83'	Report	Milesi 41', 73'; Kharbin 66', 84'

Jassim bin Hamad Stadium, Al Rayyan
Attendance: 4,934
Referee: Ravshan Irmatov (Uzbekistan)
8 May 2017
19:55 UTC+4:30

Persepolis (Iran)	4–2	(United Arab Emirates) Al-Wahda
Rafiei 17'; Taremi 20', 54', 70'	Report	Al-Akbari 34'; Tagliabué 51'

Azadi Stadium, Tehran
Attendance: 43,160
Referee: Fu Ming (China)

=== Group E ===
Pos	Team	Pld	W	D	L	GF	GA	GD	Pts	Qualification	KSA	MUA	ULS	BRI
1	(Japan) Kashima Antlers	6	4	0	2	13	5	+8	12	Advance to knockout stage	—	2–1	2–0	3–0
2	(Thailand) Muangthong United	6	3	2	1	7	3	+4	11	Advance to knockout stage	2–1	—	1–0	3–0
3	(South Korea) Ulsan Hyundai	6	2	1	3	9	9	0	7		0–4	0–0	—	6–0
4	(Australia) Brisbane Roar	6	1	1	4	4	16	−12	4		2–1	0–0	2–3	—

Source: AFC
Rules for classification: Group stage tiebreakers
21 February 2017
19:00 UTC+9

Kashima Antlers (Japan)	2–0	(South Korea) Ulsan Hyundai
Kanazaki 64'; Suzuki 82'	Report

Kashima Soccer Stadium, Kashima
Attendance: 7,860
Referee: Mohammed Abdulla Hassan Mohamed (United Arab Emirates)
21 February 2017
20:00 UTC+10

Brisbane Roar (Australia)	0–0	(Thailand) Muangthong United
	Report

Brisbane Stadium, Brisbane
Attendance: 4,536
Referee: Fahad Al-Marri (Qatar)

28 February 2017
19:30 UTC+9

Ulsan Hyundai (South Korea)	6–0	(Australia) Brisbane Roar
Kim In-sung 10', 68'; Oršić 13', 34'; Kovačec 55'; Lee Jong-ho 90+3'	Report

Ulsan Munsu Football Stadium, Ulsan
Attendance: 1,303
Referee: Turki Al-Khudhayr (Saudi Arabia)
28 February 2017
19:30 UTC+7

Muangthong United (Thailand)	2–1	(Japan) Kashima Antlers
Theerathon 12'; Xisco 90+4'	Report	Pedro Júnior 47'

Supachalasai National Stadium, Bangkok
Attendance: 12,569
Referee: Ilgiz Tantashev (Uzbekistan)

14 March 2017
19:00 UTC+9

Kashima Antlers (Japan)	3–0	(Australia) Brisbane Roar
Suzuki 43'; Ueda 76'; Endo 80'	Report

Kashima Soccer Stadium, Kashima
Attendance: 6,558
Referee: Alireza Faghani (Iran)
14 March 2017
19:30 UTC+9

Ulsan Hyundai (South Korea)	0–0	(Thailand) Muangthong United
	Report

Ulsan Munsu Football Stadium, Ulsan
Attendance: 1,327
Referee: Ali Abdulnabi (Bahrain)

12 April 2017
19:00 UTC+10

Brisbane Roar (Australia)	2–1	(Japan) Kashima Antlers
Maclaren 18'; Holman 49'	Report	Nagaki 79'

Brisbane Stadium, Brisbane
Attendance: 5,567
Referee: Wang Di (China)
12 April 2017
19:30 UTC+7

Muangthong United (Thailand)	1–0	(South Korea) Ulsan Hyundai
Teerasil 37'	Report

SCG Stadium, Nonthaburi
Attendance: 11,099
Referee: Alireza Faghani (Iran)

26 April 2017
19:30 UTC+9

Ulsan Hyundai (South Korea)	0–4	(Japan) Kashima Antlers
	Report	Kanazaki 52', 67'; Pedro Júnior 54'; Léo Silva 90'

Ulsan Munsu Football Stadium, Ulsan
Attendance: 1,194
Referee: Aziz Asimov (Uzbekistan)
26 April 2017
19:30 UTC+7

Muangthong United (Thailand)	3–0	(Australia) Brisbane Roar
Xisco 37'; Chanathip 83'; Teerasil 89'	Report

SCG Stadium, Nonthaburi
Attendance: 11,807
Referee: Fahad Al-Mirdasi (Saudi Arabia)

10 May 2017
19:00 UTC+9

Kashima Antlers (Japan)	2–1	(Thailand) Muangthong United
Suzuki 19', 60'	Report	Teerasil 45'

Kashima Soccer Stadium, Kashima
Attendance: 7,928
Referee: Abdulrahman Al-Jassim (Qatar)
10 May 2017
20:00 UTC+10

Brisbane Roar (Australia)	2–3	(South Korea) Ulsan Hyundai
Maclaren 18', 37'	Report	Young 9' (o.g.); Nam Hee-cheol 54'; Kim Yong-jin 76'

Brisbane Stadium, Brisbane
Attendance: 3,245
Referee: Mohanad Qasim Eesee Sarray (Iraq)

=== Group F ===
Pos	Team	Pld	W	D	L	GF	GA	GD	Pts	Qualification	URA	SSI	SEO	WSW
1	(Japan) Urawa Red Diamonds	6	4	0	2	18	7	+11	12 (Note: Head-to-head results: Shanghai SIPG 3–2 Urawa Red Diamonds, Urawa Red Diamonds 1–0 Shanghai SIPG (Urawa Red Diamonds won on away goals).)	Advance to knockout stage	—	1–0	5–2	6–1
2	(China) Shanghai SIPG	6	4	0	2	15	9	+6	12	Advance to knockout stage	3–2	—	4–2	5–1
3	(South Korea) FC Seoul	6	2	0	4	10	15	−5	6 (Note: Head-to-head results: FC Seoul 2–3 Western Sydney Wanderers, Western Sydney Wanderers 2–3 FC Seoul (tied on head-to-head results, ranked on total goal difference).)		1–0	0–1	—	2–3
4	(Australia) Western Sydney Wanderers	6	2	0	4	10	22	−12	6		0–4	3–2	2–3	—

Source: AFC
Rules for classification: Group stage tiebreakers
Notes:
21 February 2017
19:00 UTC+11

Western Sydney Wanderers (Australia)	0–4	(Japan) Urawa Red Diamonds
	Report	Koroki 56'; Lee 58'; Makino 68'; Rafael Silva 86'

Campbelltown Stadium, Sydney
Attendance: 5,590
Referee: Ravshan Irmatov (Uzbekistan)
21 February 2017
19:30 UTC+9

FC Seoul (South Korea)	0–1	(China) Shanghai SIPG
	Report	Hulk 53'

Seoul World Cup Stadium, Seoul
Attendance: 18,764
Referee: Abdulrahman Al-Jassim (Qatar)

28 February 2017
19:30 UTC+9

Urawa Red Diamonds (Japan)	5–2	(South Korea) FC Seoul
Muto 9'; Lee 11'; Sekine 15'; Ugajin 21'; Komai 45'	Report	Park Chu-young 14'; Damjanović 90+2'

Saitama Stadium 2002, Saitama
Attendance: 18,727
Referee: Liu Kwok Man (Hong Kong)
28 February 2017
19:30 UTC+8

Shanghai SIPG (China)	5–1	(Australia) Western Sydney Wanderers
Hulk 2'; Oscar 17'; Shi Ke 25'; Elkeson 27'; Wu Lei 75'	Report	Nichols 20'

Shanghai Stadium, Shanghai
Attendance: 28,090
Referee: Ahmed Al-Kaf (Oman)

15 March 2017
19:30 UTC+9

FC Seoul (South Korea)	2–3	(Australia) Western Sydney Wanderers
Yun Il-lok 66', 71'	Report	Scott 24'; Antonis 40' (pen.); Sotirio 63'

Seoul World Cup Stadium, Seoul
Attendance: 4,769
Referee: Ammar Al-Jeneibi (United Arab Emirates)
15 March 2017
19:30 UTC+8

Shanghai SIPG (China)	3–2	(Japan) Urawa Red Diamonds
Shi Ke 10'; Elkeson 45'; Hulk 52'	Report	Rafael Silva 72' (pen.); Endo 84'

Shanghai Stadium, Shanghai
Attendance: 35,333
Referee: Fahad Al-Mirdasi (Saudi Arabia)

11 April 2017
20:00 UTC+10

Western Sydney Wanderers (Australia)	2–3	(South Korea) FC Seoul
Antonis 77'; Scott 90+2'	Report	Lee Seok-hyun 4'; Damjanović 42' (pen.), 71'

Campbelltown Stadium, Sydney
Attendance: 5,356
Referee: Nivon Robesh Gamini (Sri Lanka)
11 April 2017
19:30 UTC+9

Urawa Red Diamonds (Japan)	1–0	(China) Shanghai SIPG
Rafael Silva 44'	Report

Saitama Stadium 2002, Saitama
Attendance: 21,858
Referee: Mohammed Abdulla Hassan (United Arab Emirates)

26 April 2017
19:30 UTC+9

Urawa Red Diamonds (Japan)	6–1	(Australia) Western Sydney Wanderers
Sekine 14'; Ljubijankić 18'; Lee 43'; Rafael Silva 71', 80'; Koroki 90+4'	Report	Kusukami 66'

Saitama Stadium 2002, Saitama
Attendance: 19,467
Referee: Khamis Al-Marri (Qatar)
26 April 2017
19:30 UTC+8

Shanghai SIPG (China)	4–2	(South Korea) FC Seoul
Hulk 27'; Zhang Wei 32'; Wu Lei 45'; Oscar 74'	Report	Maurinho 11'; Park Chu-young 70'

Shanghai Stadium, Shanghai
Attendance: 35,003
Referee: Ravshan Irmatov (Uzbekistan)

10 May 2017
19:00 UTC+9

FC Seoul (South Korea)	1–0	(Japan) Urawa Red Diamonds
Yoon Seung-won 38'	Report

Seoul World Cup Stadium, Seoul
Attendance: 4,933
Referee: Alireza Faghani (Iran)
10 May 2017
20:00 UTC+10

Western Sydney Wanderers (Australia)	3–2	(China) Shanghai SIPG
Kusukami 3'; Lustica 6'; Sotirio 89'	Report	Wu Lei 1'; Elkeson 23' (pen.)

Campbelltown Stadium, Sydney
Attendance: 5,271
Referee: Turki Al-Khudhayr (Saudi Arabia)

=== Group G ===
Pos	Team	Pld	W	D	L	GF	GA	GD	Pts	Qualification	KAW	GZE	SSB	EAS
1	(Japan) Kawasaki Frontale	6	2	4	0	8	3	+5	10 (Note: Head-to-head results: Guangzhou Evergrande 1–1 Kawasaki Frontale, Kawasaki Frontale 0–0 Guangzhou Evergrande (Kawasaki Frontale won on away goals).)	Advance to knockout stage	—	0–0	1–1	4–0
2	(China) Guangzhou Evergrande	6	2	4	0	18	5	+13	10	Advance to knockout stage	1–1	—	2–2	7–0
3	(South Korea) Suwon Samsung Bluewings	6	2	3	1	11	6	+5	9		0–1	2–2	—	5–0
4	(Hong Kong) Eastern	6	0	1	5	1	24	−23	1		1–1	0–6	0–1	—

Source: AFC
Rules for classification: Group stage tiebreakers
Notes:
22 February 2017
19:00 UTC+9

Kawasaki Frontale (Japan)	1–1	(South Korea) Suwon Samsung Bluewings
Kobayashi 10'	Report	Taniguchi 23' (o.g.)

Todoroki Athletics Stadium, Kawasaki
Attendance: 11,150
Referee: Ali Abdulnabi (Bahrain)
22 February 2017
20:00 UTC+8

Guangzhou Evergrande (China)	7–0	(Hong Kong) Eastern
Goulart 5' (pen.); Wang Shangyuan 22', 85'; Liao Lisheng 33', 47'; Alan 65'; Paulinho 83'	Report

Tianhe Stadium, Guangzhou
Attendance: 38,631
Referee: Chris Beath (Australia)

1 March 2017
19:00 UTC+9

Suwon Samsung Bluewings (South Korea)	2–2	(China) Guangzhou Evergrande
Santos 15'; Johnathan 32'	Report	Goulart 25'; Alan 81'

Suwon World Cup Stadium, Suwon
Attendance: 9,228
Referee: Fahad Al-Mirdasi (Saudi Arabia)
1 March 2017
20:00 UTC+8

Eastern (Hong Kong)	1–1	(Japan) Kawasaki Frontale
Bleda 14' (pen.)	Report	Itakura 52'

Mong Kok Stadium, Hong Kong
Attendance: 5,787
Referee: Mohanad Qasim Eesee Sarray (Iraq)

14 March 2017
20:00 UTC+8

Eastern (Hong Kong)	0–1	(South Korea) Suwon Samsung Bluewings
	Report	Johnathan 78'

Mong Kok Stadium, Hong Kong
Attendance: 5,882
Referee: Mohammed Abdulla Hassan Mohamed (United Arab Emirates)
14 March 2017
20:00 UTC+8

Guangzhou Evergrande (China)	1–1	(Japan) Kawasaki Frontale
Alan 26'	Report	Kobayashi 90+4' (pen.)

Tianhe Stadium, Guangzhou
Attendance: 38,532
Referee: Abdulrahman Al-Jassim (Qatar)

12 April 2017
19:00 UTC+9

Suwon Samsung Bluewings (South Korea)	5–0	(Hong Kong) Eastern
Yeom Ki-hun 37'; Ko Seung-beom 63', 79'; Johnathan 74', 76'	Report

Suwon World Cup Stadium, Suwon
Attendance: 2,758
Referee: Fahad Al-Marri (Qatar)
12 April 2017
19:00 UTC+9

Kawasaki Frontale (Japan)	0–0	(China) Guangzhou Evergrande
	Report

Todoroki Athletics Stadium, Kawasaki
Attendance: 13,481
Referee: Valentin Kovalenko (Uzbekistan)

25 April 2017
19:00 UTC+9

Suwon Samsung Bluewings (South Korea)	0–1	(Japan) Kawasaki Frontale
	Report	Nara 48'

Suwon World Cup Stadium, Suwon
Attendance: 3,642
Referee: Jarred Gillett (Australia)
25 April 2017
20:00 UTC+8

Eastern (Hong Kong)	0–6	(China) Guangzhou Evergrande
	Report	Paulinho 8', 82'; Mitchell 40' (o.g.); Alan 50', 71'; Yu Hanchao 90+2'

Mong Kok Stadium, Hong Kong
Attendance: 5,916
Referee: Rowan Arumughan (India)

9 May 2017
18:30 UTC+8

Guangzhou Evergrande (China)	2–2	(South Korea) Suwon Samsung Bluewings
Goulart 17', 68'	Report	Yeom Ki-hun 9'; Kim Jung-woo 79'

Tianhe Stadium, Guangzhou
Attendance: 38,576
Referee: Ali Sabah (Iraq)
9 May 2017
19:30 UTC+9

Kawasaki Frontale (Japan)	4–0	(Hong Kong) Eastern
Rhayner 28'; Taniguchi 45'; Hasegawa 49'; Nara 53'	Report

Todoroki Athletics Stadium, Kawasaki
Attendance: 11,235
Referee: Ammar Al-Jeneibi (United Arab Emirates)

=== Group H ===
Pos	Team	Pld	W	D	L	GF	GA	GD	Pts	Qualification	JIA	JEJ	ADE	GAM
1	(China) Jiangsu Suning	6	5	0	1	9	3	+6	15	Advance to knockout stage	—	1–2	2–1	3–0
2	(South Korea) Jeju United	6	3	1	2	12	9	+3	10	Advance to knockout stage	0–1	—	1–3	2–0
3	(Australia) Adelaide United	6	1	2	3	10	13	−3	5		0–1	3–3	—	0–3
4	(Japan) Gamba Osaka	6	1	1	4	7	13	−6	4		0–1	1–4	3–3	—

Source: AFC
Rules for classification: Group stage tiebreakers
22 February 2017
19:30 UTC+10:30

Adelaide United (Australia)	0–3	(Japan) Gamba Osaka
	Report	Nagasawa 21'; Konno 45+1'; McGowan 81' (o.g.)

Hindmarsh Stadium, Adelaide
Attendance: 5,071
Referee: Fahad Al-Mirdasi (Saudi Arabia)
22 February 2017
20:00 UTC+9

Jeju United (South Korea)	0–1	(China) Jiangsu Suning
	Report	Ramires 90'

Jeju World Cup Stadium, Seogwipo
Attendance: 3,688
Referee: Alireza Faghani (Iran)

1 March 2017
19:00 UTC+9

Gamba Osaka (Japan)	1–4	(South Korea) Jeju United
Ademilson 90' (pen.)	Report	Endō 43' (o.g.); Lee Chang-min 45+1', 72'; Toscano 51'

Suita City Football Stadium, Suita
Attendance: 8,211
Referee: Ammar Al-Jeneibi (United Arab Emirates)
1 March 2017
19:35 UTC+8

Jiangsu Suning (China)	2–1	(Australia) Adelaide United
Teixeira 14', 72'	Report	Babalj 90+3'

Nanjing Olympic Sports Centre, Nanjing
Attendance: 41,033
Referee: Ravshan Irmatov (Uzbekistan)

15 March 2017
19:30 UTC+10:30

Adelaide United (Australia)	3–3	(South Korea) Jeju United
Diawara 51' (pen.); Cirio 72'; Ochieng 85'	Report	Mendy 61'; Toscano 71'; Kwon Soon-hyung 84'

Hindmarsh Stadium, Adelaide
Attendance: 3,539
Referee: Khamis Al-Marri (Qatar)
15 March 2017
19:00 UTC+9

Gamba Osaka (Japan)	0–1	(China) Jiangsu Suning
	Report	Ramires 39'

Suita City Football Stadium, Suita
Attendance: 11,836
Referee: Muhammad Taqi (Singapore)

11 April 2017
20:00 UTC+9

Jeju United (South Korea)	1–3	(Australia) Adelaide United
Cruz 8'	Report	Kim Jae-sung 7'; McGowan 50'; McGree 65'

Jeju World Cup Stadium, Seogwipo
Attendance: 2,289
Referee: Ali Abdulnabi (Bahrain)
11 April 2017
19:35 UTC+8

Jiangsu Suning (China)	3–0	(Japan) Gamba Osaka
Teixeira 3'; Ramires 7'; Hong Jeong-ho 43'	Report

Nanjing Olympic Sports Centre, Nanjing
Attendance: 37,926
Referee: Turki Al-Khudhayr (Saudi Arabia)

25 April 2017
19:00 UTC+9

Gamba Osaka (Japan)	3–3	(Australia) Adelaide United
Nagasawa 6', 77'; Dōan 13'	Report	Cirio 43'; O'Doherty 54'; Diawara 90+2'

Suita City Football Stadium, Suita
Attendance: 9,209
Referee: Alireza Faghani (Iran)
25 April 2017
19:35 UTC+8

Jiangsu Suning (China)	1–2	(South Korea) Jeju United
Ramires 27'	Report	Cruz 34'; Lee Chang-min 48'

Nanjing Olympic Sports Centre, Nanjing
Attendance: 27,619
Referee: Ahmed Al-Kaf (Oman)

9 May 2017
19:30 UTC+9:30

Adelaide United (Australia)	0–1	(China) Jiangsu Suning
	Report	Ji Xiang 82'

Hindmarsh Stadium, Adelaide
Attendance: 6,797
Referee: Mohammed Abdulla Hassan Mohamed (United Arab Emirates)
9 May 2017
19:00 UTC+9

Jeju United (South Korea)	2–0	(Japan) Gamba Osaka
Chung Woon 29'; Hwang Il-su 66'	Report

Jeju World Cup Stadium, Seogwipo
Attendance: 3,256
Referee: Valentin Kovalenko (Uzbekistan)
