= 2017 AFC Champions League knockout stage =

2017 Champions League

The 2017 AFC Champions League knockout stage was played from 22 May to 25 November 2017. A total of 16 teams competed in the knockout stage to decide the champions of the 2017 AFC Champions League.

== Qualified teams ==
The winners and runners-up of each of the eight groups in the group stage advanced to the round of 16, with both West Region (Groups A–D) and East Region (Groups E–H) having eight qualified teams.

Region	Group	Winners	Runners-up
West Region	A	(United Arab Emirates) Al-Ahli	(Iran) Esteghlal
West Region	B	(Qatar) Lekhwiya	(Iran) Esteghlal Khuzestan
West Region	C	(United Arab Emirates) Al-Ain	(Saudi Arabia) Al-Ahli
West Region	D	(Saudi Arabia) Al-Hilal	(Iran) Persepolis
East Region	E	(Japan) Kashima Antlers	(Thailand) Muangthong United
East Region	F	(Japan) Urawa Red Diamonds	(China) Shanghai SIPG
East Region	G	(Japan) Kawasaki Frontale	(China) Guangzhou Evergrande
East Region	H	(China) Jiangsu Suning	(South Korea) Jeju United

== Format ==
In the knockout stage, the 16 teams played a single-elimination tournament, with the teams split into the two regions until the final. Each tie was played on a home-and-away two-legged basis. The away goals rule, extra time (away goals would not apply in extra time) and penalty shoot-out were used to decide the winner if necessary (Regulations Article 11.3).

== Schedule ==
The schedule of each round was as follows. Matches in the West Region were played on Mondays and Tuesdays, while matches in the East Region were played on Tuesdays and Wednesdays.

Round	First leg	Second leg
Round of 16	22–24 May 2017	29–31 May 2017
Quarter-finals	21–23 August 2017	11–13 September 2017
Semi-finals	26–27 September 2017	17–18 October 2017
Final	18 November 2017	25 November 2017

== Bracket ==
The bracket of the knockout stage was determined as follows:

Round	Matchups
Round of 16	(Group winners host second leg) West Region: Runner-up Group A vs. Winner Group C; Runner-up Group C vs. Winner Group A; Runner-up Group B vs. Winner Group D; Runner-up Group D vs. Winner Group B; East Region: Runner-up Group E vs. Winner Group G; Runner-up Group G vs. Winner Group E; Runner-up Group F vs. Winner Group H; Runner-up Group H vs. Winner Group F
Quarter-finals	(Matchups and order of legs decided by draw, involving four round of 16 winners each in West Region and East Region) West Region: QF1; QF2; East Region: QF3; QF4
Semi-finals	(Winners QF1 and QF3 host first leg, Winners QF2 and QF4 host second leg) West Region: SF1: Winner QF1 vs. Winner QF2; East Region: SF2: Winner QF3 vs. Winner QF4
Final	(Winner SF1 host first leg, Winner SF2 host second leg, as reversed from previous season's final): Winner SF1 vs. Winner SF2

The bracket was decided after the draw for the knockout stage, which was held on 6 June 2017, 16:00 MYT (UTC+8), at the JW Marriott Hotel Kuala Lumpur in Kuala Lumpur, Malaysia.

Round of 16	Quarter-finals
(Iran) Esteghlal	1	1	2
(United Arab Emirates) Al-Ain	0	6	6
(United Arab Emirates) Al-Ain	0	0	0
(Saudi Arabia) Al-Hilal	0	3	3
(Iran) Esteghlal Khuzestan	1	1	2
(Saudi Arabia) Al-Hilal	2	2	4
West Region
(Iran) Persepolis	0	1	1
(Qatar) Lekhwiya	0	0	0
(Iran) Persepolis	2	3	5
(Saudi Arabia) Al-Ahli	2	1	3
(Saudi Arabia) Al-Ahli	1	3	4
(United Arab Emirates) Al-Ahli	1	1	2
(China) Shanghai SIPG	2	3	5
(China) Jiangsu Suning	1	2	3
(China) Shanghai SIPG (p)	4	1	5 (5)
(China) Guangzhou Evergrande	0	5	5 (4)
(China) Guangzhou Evergrande (a)	1	1	2
(Japan) Kashima Antlers	0	2	2
East Region
(Thailand) Muangthong United	1	1	2
(Japan) Kawasaki Frontale	3	4	7
(Japan) Kawasaki Frontale	3	1	4
(Japan) Urawa Red Diamonds	1	4	5
(South Korea) Jeju United	2	0	2
(Japan) Urawa Red Diamonds (a.e.t.)	0	3	3

Semi-finals
(Saudi Arabia) Al-Hilal	4	2	6
(Iran) Persepolis	0	2	2
(China) Shanghai SIPG	1	0	1
(Japan) Urawa Red Diamonds	1	1	2

Final
(Saudi Arabia) Al-Hilal	1	0	1
(Japan) Urawa Red Diamonds	1	1	2

== Round of 16 ==
In the round of 16, the winners of one group played the runners-up of another group from the same region, with the matchups determined by the group stage draw, and the group winners hosting the second leg.

West Region
Team 1	Agg.	Team 2	1st leg	2nd leg
Esteghlal (Iran)	2–6	(United Arab Emirates) Al-Ain	1–0	1–6
Al-Ahli (Saudi Arabia)	4–2	(United Arab Emirates) Al-Ahli	1–1	3–1
Esteghlal Khuzestan (Iran)	2–4	(Saudi Arabia) Al-Hilal	1–2	1–2
Persepolis (Iran)	1–0	(Qatar) Lekhwiya	0–0	1–0

East Region
Team 1	Agg.	Team 2	1st leg	2nd leg
Muangthong United (Thailand)	2–7	(Japan) Kawasaki Frontale	1–3	1–4
Guangzhou Evergrande (China)	2–2 (a)	(Japan) Kashima Antlers	1–0	1–2
Shanghai SIPG (China)	5–3	(China) Jiangsu Suning	2–1	3–2
Jeju United (South Korea)	2–3	(Japan) Urawa Red Diamonds	2–0	0–3 (a.e.t.)

=== West Region ===
22 May 2017
20:45 UTC+4:30

Esteghlal (Iran)	1–0	(United Arab Emirates) Al-Ain
Rezaei 90+2' (pen.)	Report

Azadi Stadium, Tehran
Attendance: 67,202
Referee: Fu Ming (China)
29 May 2017
22:45 UTC+4

Al-Ain (United Arab Emirates)	6–1	(Iran) Esteghlal
Caio 27', 33'; O. Abdulrahman 49', 60'; Lee Myung-joo 56'; Al-Shamrani 75'	Report	Rezaei 83'

Hazza Bin Zayed Stadium, Al Ain
Attendance: 11,226
Referee: Ko Hyung-jin (South Korea)

Al-Ain won 6–2 on aggregate.

22 May 2017
20:45 UTC+3

Al-Ahli (Saudi Arabia)	1–1	(United Arab Emirates) Al-Ahli
Asiri 38'	Report	Esmaeel 21'

King Abdullah Sports City, Jeddah
Attendance: 17,323
Referee: Ali Sabah (Iraq)
29 May 2017
23:00 UTC+4

Al-Ahli (United Arab Emirates)	1–3	(Saudi Arabia) Al-Ahli
Gyan 90+1' (pen.)	Report	Al-Jassim 18'; Al-Mogahwi 24'; Abdul-Amir 72' (pen.)

Al-Rashid Stadium, Dubai
Attendance: 3,993
Referee: Chris Beath (Australia)

Al-Ahli (KSA) won 4–2 on aggregate.

23 May 2017
20:00 UTC+4

Esteghlal Khuzestan (Iran)	1–2	(Saudi Arabia) Al-Hilal
Al-Hafith 42' (o.g.)	Report	Al-Zori 52'; Carlos Eduardo 57'

Al-Seeb Stadium, Seeb (Oman) (Note: Matches between teams from Iran and Saudi Arabia were played on neutral venues due to deterioration of Iran–Saudi Arabia relations.)
Attendance: 2,670
Referee: Ali Abdulnabi (Bahrain)
30 May 2017
22:30 UTC+3

Al-Hilal (Saudi Arabia)	2–1	(Iran) Esteghlal Khuzestan
Kharbin 16'; Al-Dawsari 82'	Report	Nong 12'

Thani bin Jassim Stadium, Al Rayyan (Qatar)
Attendance: 1,620
Referee: Jumpei Iida (Japan)

Al-Hilal won 4–2 on aggregate.

23 May 2017
19:30 UTC+4:30

Persepolis (Iran)	0–0	(Qatar) Lekhwiya
	Report

Azadi Stadium, Tehran
Attendance: 40 (Note: The Persepolis v Lekhwiya match was played behind closed doors due to spectator misconduct during Persepolis's home match against Al-Wahda on 8 May 2017.)
Referee: Valentin Kovalenko (Uzbekistan)
30 May 2017
22:00 UTC+3

Lekhwiya (Qatar)	0–1	(Iran) Persepolis
	Report	Chico 24' (o.g.)

Jassim bin Hamad Stadium, Al Rayyan
Attendance: 1,700
Referee: Ma Ning (China)

Persepolis won 1–0 on aggregate.

=== East Region ===
23 May 2017
19:30 UTC+7

Muangthong United (Thailand)	1–3	(Japan) Kawasaki Frontale
Teerasil 45+2'	Report	Nakamura 66'; Kobayashi 69'; Abe 89'

SCG Stadium, Nonthaburi
Attendance: 12,500
Referee: Khamis Al-Marri (Qatar)
30 May 2017
19:00 UTC+9

Kawasaki Frontale (Japan)	4–1	(Thailand) Muangthong United
Kobayashi 31'; Hasegawa 32'; Eduardo Neto 40'; Rhayner 79'	Report	Teerasil 89'

Todoroki Athletics Stadium, Kawasaki
Attendance: 11,931
Referee: Alireza Faghani (Iran)

Kawasaki Frontale won 7–2 on aggregate.

23 May 2017
20:00 UTC+8

Guangzhou Evergrande (China)	1–0	(Japan) Kashima Antlers
Paulinho 75'	Report

Tianhe Stadium, Guangzhou
Attendance: 39,863
Referee: Adham Makhadmeh (Jordan)
30 May 2017
19:00 UTC+9

Kashima Antlers (Japan)	2–1	(China) Guangzhou Evergrande
Pedro Júnior 28'; Kanazaki 90+1'	Report	Paulinho 55'

Kashima Soccer Stadium, Kashima
Attendance: 11,388
Referee: Ravshan Irmatov (Uzbekistan)

2–2 on aggregate. Guangzhou Evergrande won on away goals.

24 May 2017
20:00 UTC+8

Shanghai SIPG (China)	2–1	(China) Jiangsu Suning
Hulk 33' (pen.); Ahmedov 45+1'	Report	Martínez 8'

Shanghai Stadium, Shanghai
Attendance: 23,093
Referee: Mohanad Qasim Eesee Sarray (Iraq)
31 May 2017
20:00 UTC+8

Jiangsu Suning (China)	2–3	(China) Shanghai SIPG
Hong Jeong-ho 75'; Wu Xi 90+3'	Report	Elkeson 34'; Yang Xiaotian 43' (o.g.); Hulk 90+4'

Nanjing Olympic Sports Centre, Nanjing
Attendance: 37,269
Referee: Fahad Al-Mirdasi (Saudi Arabia)

Shanghai SIPG won 5–3 on aggregate.

24 May 2017
15:00 UTC+9

Jeju United (South Korea)	2–0	(Japan) Urawa Red Diamonds
Toscano 7'; Jin Seong-wook 90+2'	Report

Jeju Stadium, Jeju
Attendance: 1,913
Referee: Aziz Asimov (Uzbekistan)
31 May 2017
19:30 UTC+9

Urawa Red Diamonds (Japan)	3–0 (a.e.t.)	(South Korea) Jeju United
Koroki 18'; Lee 34'; Moriwaki 114'	Report

Saitama Stadium 2002, Saitama
Attendance: 19,149
Referee: Liu Kwok Man (Hong Kong)

Urawa Red Diamonds won 3–2 on aggregate.

== Quarter-finals ==
The draw for the quarter-finals was held on 6 June 2017. In the quarter-finals, the four teams from the West Region played in two ties, and the four teams from the East Region played in two ties, with the matchups and order of legs decided by draw, without any seeding or country protection.

West Region
Team 1	Agg.	Team 2	1st leg	2nd leg
Al-Ain (United Arab Emirates)	0–3	(Saudi Arabia) Al-Hilal	0–0	0–3
Persepolis (Iran)	5–3	(Saudi Arabia) Al-Ahli	2–2	3–1

East Region
Team 1	Agg.	Team 2	1st leg	2nd leg
Shanghai SIPG (China)	5–5 (5–4 p)	(China) Guangzhou Evergrande	4–0	1–5 (a.e.t.)
Kawasaki Frontale (Japan)	4–5	(Japan) Urawa Red Diamonds	3–1	1–4

=== West Region ===
21 August 2017
19:50 UTC+4

Al-Ain (United Arab Emirates)	0–0	(Saudi Arabia) Al-Hilal
	Report

Hazza Bin Zayed Stadium, Al Ain
Attendance: 21,223
Referee: Peter Green (Australia)
11 September 2017
20:00 UTC+3

Al-Hilal (Saudi Arabia)	3–0	(United Arab Emirates) Al-Ain
Carlos Eduardo 42', 45+1', 74'	Report

King Fahd International Stadium, Riyadh
Attendance: 42,146
Referee: Ravshan Irmatov (Uzbekistan)

Al Hilal won 3–0 on aggregate.

22 August 2017
20:00 UTC+4

Persepolis (Iran)	2–2	(Saudi Arabia) Al-Ahli
Khalilzadeh 71'; Mensha 84'	Report	Al Somah 2'; Leonardo 58'

Sultan Qaboos Sports Complex, Muscat (Oman)
Attendance: 6,500
Referee: Adham Makhadmeh (Jordan)
12 September 2017
19:15 UTC+4

Al-Ahli (Saudi Arabia)	1–3	(Iran) Persepolis
Al-Amri 52'	Report	Alipour 5'; Mensha 83' (pen.); Taremi 90+4' (pen.)

Mohammed Bin Zayed Stadium, Abu Dhabi (United Arab Emirates)
Attendance: 5,820
Referee: Ma Ning (China)

Persepolis won 5–3 on aggregate.

=== East Region ===
22 August 2017
20:00 UTC+8

Shanghai SIPG (China)	4–0	(China) Guangzhou Evergrande
Hulk 39' (pen.); Wang Shenchao 45+1'; Wu Lei 62', 65'	Report

Shanghai Stadium, Shanghai
Attendance: 36,503
Referee: Nawaf Shukralla (Bahrain)
12 September 2017
20:00 UTC+8

Guangzhou Evergrande (China)	5–1 (a.e.t.)	(China) Shanghai SIPG
Alan 21', 35'; Goulart 83', 90+1', 117' (pen.)	Report	Hulk 111'
Penalties
Goulart (penalty missed); Alan (penalty scored); Liao Lisheng (penalty scored); Muriqui (penalty scored); Zheng Zhi (penalty scored)	4–5	(penalty scored) Hulk; (penalty scored) Oscar; (penalty scored) Wu Lei; (penalty scored) Ahmedov; (penalty scored) Yu Hai

Tianhe Stadium, Guangzhou
Attendance: 39,972
Referee: Alireza Faghani (Iran)

5–5 on aggregate. Shanghai SIPG won 5–4 on penalties.

23 August 2017
19:00 UTC+9

Kawasaki Frontale (Japan)	3–1	(Japan) Urawa Red Diamonds
Kobayashi 33', 85'; Elsinho 50'	Report	Muto 76'

Todoroki Athletics Stadium, Kawasaki
Attendance: 18,080
Referee: Mohammed Abdulla Hassan Mohamed (United Arab Emirates)
13 September 2017
19:30 UTC+9

Urawa Red Diamonds (Japan)	4–1	(Japan) Kawasaki Frontale
Koroki 35'; Ljubijankić 70'; Rafael Silva 84'; Takagi 86'	Report	Elsinho 19'

Saitama Stadium 2002, Saitama
Attendance: 26,785
Referee: Fahad Al-Mirdasi (Saudi Arabia)

Urawa Red Diamonds won 5–4 on aggregate.

== Semi-finals ==
In the semi-finals, the two quarter-final winners from the West Region played each other, and the two quarter-final winners from the East Region played each other, with the order of legs determined by the quarter-final draw.

West Region
Team 1	Agg.	Team 2	1st leg	2nd leg
Al-Hilal (Saudi Arabia)	6–2	(Iran) Persepolis	4–0	2–2

East Region
Team 1	Agg.	Team 2	1st leg	2nd leg
Shanghai SIPG (China)	1–2	(Japan) Urawa Red Diamonds	1–1	0–1

=== West Region ===
26 September 2017
20:00 UTC+4

Al-Hilal (Saudi Arabia)	4–0	(Iran) Persepolis
Kharbin 31', 54', 81'; Al-Shahrani 40'	Report

Mohammed Bin Zayed Stadium, Abu Dhabi (United Arab Emirates)
Attendance: 11,321
Referee: Kim Jong-hyeok (South Korea)
17 October 2017
20:00 UTC+4

Persepolis (Iran)	2–2	(Saudi Arabia) Al-Hilal
Mensha 16', 61'	Report	Kharbin 30' (pen.), 76'

Sultan Qaboos Sports Complex, Muscat (Oman)
Attendance: 3,250
Referee: Ahmed Al-Kaf (Oman)

Al Hilal won 6–2 on aggregate.

=== East Region ===
27 September 2017
20:00 UTC+8

Shanghai SIPG (China)	1–1	(Japan) Urawa Red Diamonds
Hulk 15'	Report	Kashiwagi 27'

Shanghai Stadium, Shanghai
Attendance: 33,513
Referee: Abdulrahman Al-Jassim (Qatar)
18 October 2017
19:30 UTC+9

Urawa Red Diamonds (Japan)	1–0	(China) Shanghai SIPG
Rafael Silva 12'	Report

Saitama Stadium 2002, Saitama
Attendance: 44,375
Referee: Chris Beath (Australia)

Urawa Red Diamonds won 2–1 on aggregate.

== Final ==
In the final, the two semi-final winners played each other, with the order of legs (first leg hosted by team from the West Region, second leg hosted by team from the East Region) reversed from the previous season's final.

18 November 2017
19:15 UTC+3

Al-Hilal (Saudi Arabia)	1–1	(Japan) Urawa Red Diamonds
Kharbin 37'	Report	Rafael Silva 7'

King Fahd International Stadium, Riyadh
Attendance: 59,136
Referee: Adham Makhadmeh (Jordan)
25 November 2017
19:15 UTC+9

Urawa Red Diamonds (Japan)	1–0	(Saudi Arabia) Al-Hilal
Rafael Silva 88'	Report

Saitama Stadium 2002, Saitama
Attendance: 57,727
Referee: Ravshan Irmatov (Uzbekistan)

Urawa Red Diamonds won 2–1 on aggregate.
