= 2017 AFC Champions League qualifying play-offs =

Champions League

The 2017 AFC Champions League qualifying play-offs were played from 24 January to 8 February 2017. A total of 23 teams competed in the qualifying play-offs to decide eight of the 32 places in the group stage of the 2017 AFC Champions League.

== Teams ==
The following 23 teams, split into two regions (West Region and East Region), entered the qualifying play-offs, consisting of three rounds:

- 2 teams entered in the preliminary round 1.
- 11 teams entered in the preliminary round 2.
- 10 teams entered in the play-off round.

Region	Teams entering in play-off round	Teams entering in preliminary round 2	Teams entering in preliminary round 1
West Region	(United Arab Emirates) Al-Wahda; (Saudi Arabia) Al-Fateh; (Iran) Esteghlal; (Qatar) El Jaish; (Qatar) Al-Sadd; (Uzbekistan) Bunyodkor	(Uzbekistan) Nasaf Qarshi; (Jordan) Al-Wehdat; (India) Bengaluru FC; (Bahrain) Al-Hidd	
East Region	~~(South Korea) Jeju United~~ (Note: On 18 January 2017, Jeonbuk Hyundai Motors were excluded from the 2017 AFC Champions League due to bribery scandal. As a result, Jeju United entered the group stage instead of the qualifying play-offs to replace them, while Ulsan Hyundai entered the qualifying play-offs to replace Jeju United.); (South Korea) Ulsan Hyundai; (Japan) Gamba Osaka (Note: The identity of the play-off team from Japan was not known at the time of the group stage draw.); (China) Shanghai SIPG; (China) Shanghai Shenhua	(Australia) Brisbane Roar; (Thailand) Sukhothai; (Thailand) Bangkok United; (Hong Kong) Kitchee; (Vietnam) Hà Nội; (Malaysia) Johor Darul Ta'zim; (Myanmar) Yadanarbon	(Philippines) Global; (Singapore) Tampines Rovers

== Format ==
In the qualifying play-offs, each tie was played as a single match. Extra time and penalty shoot-out were used to decide the winner if necessary (Regulations Article 9.2). The eight winners of the play-off round advanced to the group stage to join the 24 direct entrants. All losers in each round from associations with only play-off slots entered the AFC Cup group stage.

== Schedule ==
The schedule of each round was as follows.

Round	Match date
Preliminary round 1	24 January 2017
Preliminary round 2	25 & 31 January 2017
Play-off round	7–8 February 2017

== Bracket ==
The bracket of the qualifying play-offs for each region was determined by the AFC based on the association ranking of each team, with the team from the higher-ranked association hosting the match. Teams from the same association could not be placed into the same play-off.

=== Play-off West 1 ===
- (United Arab Emirates) Al-Wahda advanced to Group D.

Preliminary round 1	Preliminary round 2		Play-off round
			(United Arab Emirates) Al-Wahda	3
			(Jordan) Al-Wehdat	0
	(Jordan) Al-Wehdat	2
	(India) Bengaluru FC	1

=== Play-off West 2 ===
- (Saudi Arabia) Al-Fateh advanced to Group B.

Preliminary round 1	Preliminary round 2		Play-off round
			(Saudi Arabia) Al-Fateh	1
			(Uzbekistan) Nasaf Qarshi	0
	(Uzbekistan) Nasaf Qarshi	4
	(Bahrain) Al-Hidd	0

=== Play-off West 3 ===
- (Iran) Esteghlal advanced to Group A.

Preliminary round 1	Preliminary round 2	Play-off round
		(Iran) Esteghlal (p)	0 (4)
		(Qatar) Al-Sadd	0 (3)

=== Play-off West 4 ===
- (Uzbekistan) Bunyodkor advanced to Group C.

Preliminary round 1	Preliminary round 2	Play-off round
		(Qatar) El Jaish	0 (1)
		(Uzbekistan) Bunyodkor (p)	0 (3)

=== Play-off East 1 ===
- (South Korea) Ulsan Hyundai advanced to Group E.

Preliminary round 1	Preliminary round 2		Play-off round
			(South Korea) Ulsan Hyundai (p)	1 (4)
			(Hong Kong) Kitchee	1 (3)
	(Hong Kong) Kitchee (a.e.t.)	3
	(Vietnam) Hà Nội	2

=== Play-off East 2 ===
- (Japan) Gamba Osaka advanced to Group H.

Preliminary round 1	Preliminary round 2		Play-off round
			(Japan) Gamba Osaka	3
			(Malaysia) Johor Darul Ta'zim	0
	(Thailand) Bangkok United	1 (4)
	(Malaysia) Johor Darul Ta'zim (p)	1 (5)

=== Play-off East 3 ===
- (China) Shanghai SIPG advanced to Group F.

Preliminary round 1	Preliminary round 2		Play-off round
			(China) Shanghai SIPG	3
			(Thailand) Sukhothai	0
	(Thailand) Sukhothai	5
	(Myanmar) Yadanarbon	0

=== Play-off East 4 ===
- (Australia) Brisbane Roar advanced to Group E.

Preliminary round 1		Preliminary round 2		Play-off round
				(China) Shanghai Shenhua	0
				(Australia) Brisbane Roar	2
		(Australia) Brisbane Roar	6
(Philippines) Global	2	(Philippines) Global	0
(Singapore) Tampines Rovers	0

== Preliminary round 1 ==
A total of 2 teams played in the preliminary round 1.

East Region
Team 1	Score	Team 2
Global (Philippines)	2–0	(Singapore) Tampines Rovers

=== East Region ===
24 January 2017
19:30 UTC+8

Global (Philippines)	2–0	(Singapore) Tampines Rovers
Azzawi 61'; Bahadoran 73'	Report

Rizal Memorial Stadium, Manila
Attendance: 1,120
Referee: Liu Kwok Man (Hong Kong)

== Preliminary round 2 ==
A total of 12 teams played in the preliminary round 2: 11 teams which entered in this round, and 1 winner of the preliminary round 1.

West Region
Team 1	Score	Team 2
Al-Wehdat (Jordan)	2–1	(India) Bengaluru FC
Nasaf Qarshi (Uzbekistan)	4–0	(Bahrain) Al-Hidd

East Region
Team 1	Score	Team 2
Kitchee (Hong Kong)	3–2 (a.e.t.)	(Vietnam) Hà Nội
Bangkok United (Thailand)	1–1 (a.e.t.) (4–5 p)	(Malaysia) Johor Darul Ta'zim
Sukhothai (Thailand)	5–0	(Myanmar) Yadanarbon
Brisbane Roar (Australia)	6–0	(Philippines) Global

=== West Region ===
31 January 2017
18:00 UTC+2

Al-Wehdat (Jordan)	2–1	(India) Bengaluru FC
Wridat 48'; Faisal 65' (pen.)	Report	Chhetri 68'

King Abdullah II Stadium, Amman
Attendance: 10,000
Referee: Nagor Amir Noor Mohamed (Malaysia)

31 January 2017
16:00 UTC+5

Nasaf Qarshi (Uzbekistan)	4–0	(Bahrain) Al-Hidd
Erkinov 16'; Golban 26'; Narzullaev 77'; Ćeran 90+1'	Report

Bunyodkor Stadium, Tashkent
Attendance: 2,888
Referee: Nivon Robesh Gamini (Sri Lanka)

=== East Region ===
25 January 2017 (Note: The Kitchee v Hà Nội match was brought forward from 31 January 2017 due to Kitchee's participation in the 2017 Lunar New Year Cup.)
20:00 UTC+8

Kitchee (Hong Kong)	3–2 (a.e.t.)	(Vietnam) Hà Nội
Sandro 85'; Akande 109'; Lam Ka Wai 120+3'	Report	Marronkle 73', 115'

Hong Kong Stadium, Hong Kong
Attendance: 3,778
Referee: Jumpei Iida (Japan)

31 January 2017
19:00 UTC+7

Bangkok United (Thailand)	1–1 (a.e.t.)	(Malaysia) Johor Darul Ta'zim
Okwunwanne 120+1'	Report	Safiq 108'
Penalties
Teeratep (penalty scored); Bošković (penalty missed); Gjurovski (penalty scored); Macena (penalty scored); Okwunwanne (penalty scored); Anthony (penalty missed)	4–5	(penalty scored) Safiq; (penalty missed) António; (penalty scored) Fadhli; (penalty scored) Amirul; (penalty scored) Hazwan; (penalty scored) Nazmi

Thammasat Stadium, Pathum Thani
Attendance: 4,502
Referee: Wang Di (China)

31 January 2017
19:00 UTC+7

Sukhothai (Thailand)	5–0	(Myanmar) Yadanarbon
Katano 11'; Lursan 16'; Adrović 61' (pen.), 74'; Weerasak 90'	Report

Thung Thalay Luang Stadium, Sukhothai
Attendance: 4,865
Referee: Kim Dong-jin (South Korea)

31 January 2017
19:00 UTC+10

Brisbane Roar (Australia)	6–0	(Philippines) Global
Borrello 12', 26', 30', 80'; Arana 35', 65'	Report

Brisbane Stadium, Brisbane
Attendance: 3,657
Referee: Khamis Al-Marri (Qatar)

== Play-off round ==
A total of 16 teams played in the play-off round: 10 teams which entered in this round, and 6 winners of the preliminary round 2.

West Region
Team 1	Score	Team 2
Al-Wahda (United Arab Emirates)	3–0	(Jordan) Al-Wehdat
Al-Fateh (Saudi Arabia)	1–0	(Uzbekistan) Nasaf Qarshi
Esteghlal (Iran)	0–0 (a.e.t.) (4–3 p)	(Qatar) Al-Sadd
El Jaish (Qatar)	0–0 (a.e.t.) (1–3 p)	(Uzbekistan) Bunyodkor

East Region
Team 1	Score	Team 2
Ulsan Hyundai (South Korea)	1–1 (a.e.t.) (4–3 p)	(Hong Kong) Kitchee
Gamba Osaka (Japan)	3–0	(Malaysia) Johor Darul Ta'zim
Shanghai SIPG (China)	3–0	(Thailand) Sukhothai
Shanghai Shenhua (China)	0–2	(Australia) Brisbane Roar

=== West Region ===
7 February 2017
20:15 UTC+4

Al-Wahda (United Arab Emirates)	3–0	(Jordan) Al-Wehdat
Rashed 2'; Tagliabué 24', 82'	Report

Al Nahyan Stadium, Abu Dhabi
Attendance: 10,061
Referee: Jarred Gillett (Australia)

7 February 2017
18:00 UTC+3

Al-Fateh (Saudi Arabia)	1–0	(Uzbekistan) Nasaf Qarshi
Ukra 45+1'	Report

Prince Abdullah bin Jalawi Stadium, Al-Hasa
Attendance: 7,439
Referee: Ko Hyung-jin (South Korea)

7 February 2017
19:00 UTC+3:30

Esteghlal (Iran)	0–0 (a.e.t.)	(Qatar) Al-Sadd
	Report
Penalties
Rezaei (penalty scored); Ebrahimi (penalty missed); Ghorbani (penalty scored); Esmaeili (penalty scored); Heydari (penalty scored)	4–3	(penalty scored) Al-Haidos; (penalty scored) Xavi; (penalty missed) Majid; (penalty missed) Kasola; (penalty scored) Boundjah

Azadi Stadium, Tehran
Attendance: 74,560
Referee: Ahmed Al-Kaf (Oman)

7 February 2017
18:15 UTC+3

El Jaish (Qatar)	0–0 (a.e.t.)	(Uzbekistan) Bunyodkor
	Report
Penalties
Romarinho (penalty missed); Rashidov (penalty missed); Mothnani (penalty scored); Siddiq (penalty missed)	1–3	(penalty scored) Khamdamov; (penalty scored) Ashurmatov; (penalty scored) Shomurodov

Abdullah bin Khalifa Stadium, Doha
Attendance: 1,150
Referee: Adham Makhadmeh (Jordan)

=== East Region ===
7 February 2017
19:30 UTC+9

Ulsan Hyundai (South Korea)	1–1 (a.e.t.)	(Hong Kong) Kitchee
Kim Sung-hwan 45+1'	Report	Kim Bong-jin 47'
Penalties
Kovačec (penalty scored); Lee Ki-je (penalty missed); Lee Jong-ho (penalty scored); Lee Yeong-jae (penalty scored); Kim In-sung (penalty scored)	4–3	(penalty missed) Akande; (penalty scored) Sandro; (penalty scored) Vadócz; (penalty scored) Hélio; (penalty missed) Fernando

Ulsan Munsu Football Stadium, Ulsan
Attendance: 2,843
Referee: Hettikamkanamge Perera (Sri Lanka)

7 February 2017
19:00 UTC+9

Gamba Osaka (Japan)	3–0	(Malaysia) Johor Darul Ta'zim
Ademilson 26'; Nagasawa 29'; Miura 70'	Report

Suita City Football Stadium, Suita
Attendance: 8,149
Referee: Turki Al-Khudhayr (Saudi Arabia)

7 February 2017
19:30 UTC+8

Shanghai SIPG (China)	3–0	(Thailand) Sukhothai
Oscar 34'; Elkeson 39'; Kiattisak 58' (o.g.)	Report

Shanghai Stadium, Shanghai
Attendance: 25,860
Referee: Muhammad Taqi (Singapore)

8 February 2017
19:45 UTC+8

Shanghai Shenhua (China)	0–2	(Australia) Brisbane Roar
	Report	Borrello 2'; Oar 41'

Hongkou Football Stadium, Shanghai
Attendance: 23,980
Referee: Valentin Kovalenko (Uzbekistan)
