= Alterosa =

- Municipality
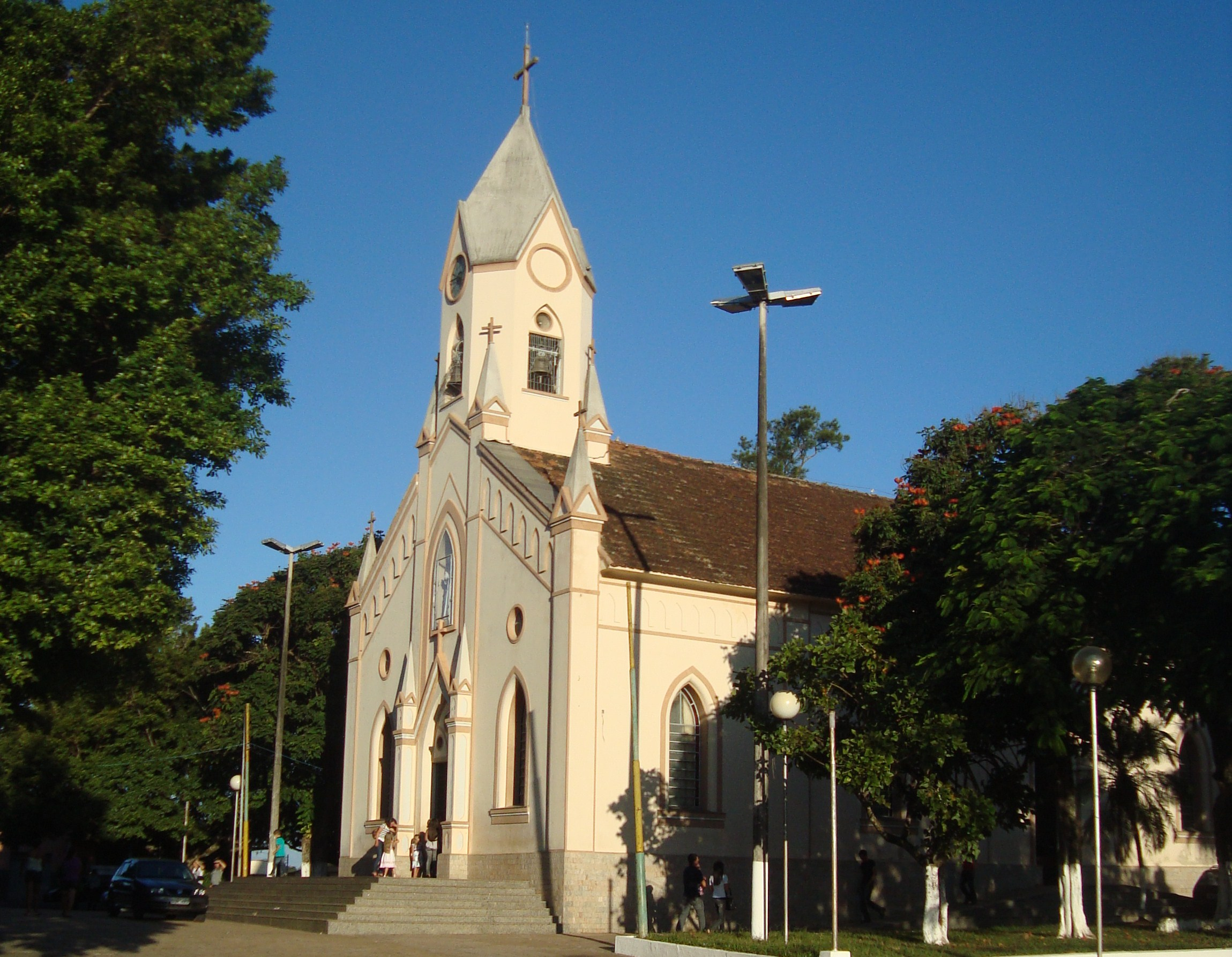

- Flag Coat of arms

- Location of Alterosa in Minas Gerais

- Location in Brazil
- Coordinates: 21°15′S 46°08′W
- Country: Brazil
- Region: Southeast
- State: Minas Gerais
- Founded: 17 December 1938

Government
  - Mayor: Hermes de Souza Silva (PSB; –2020)
  - Vice-mayor: Abimael

Area
  - Total: 366.101 km^{2} (141.352 sq mi)
- Elevation: 848 m (2,782 ft)

Population (2020)
  - Total: 14,517
- Demonym: Alterosense
- Website: www.alterosa.mg.gov.br

Alterosa is a Brazilian municipality in the South of the state of Minas Gerais. According to latest data from IBGE (2020), its population is estimated to be 14,517. The inhabitants of the city usually travel to the nearest city, Alfenas, when they are in need of more sophisticated supplies.

Alterosa was founded on 17 December 1938.

== History ==
It is said that Alterosa was one of the first populated places in the South of Minas Gerais. By the year of 1700, the residents took notice of the small river that became known as Ribeirão São Joaquim. José Rodrigues Moreira, a Portuguese man coming from Espírito Santo, marked the development of the city. In that occasion, the people living there called the city São Joaquim da Serra Negra, due to the existence of a hill in the surroundings.

On 28 June 1850, a very influent Baron (Barão Silva) turned Alterosa to a municipality, after the building of a Parish.

The name Alterosa means "High Majesty".

== Geography ==
Located in the margins of the Furnas Lake, the municipality of Alterosa belongs to the administrative region of Alfenas/Varginha.

It is situated in 21° 14' 45" of the south latitude and 46° 08' 30" of west longitude, in the South of the State of Minas Gerais. Areado is in the south of Alterosa, Alfenas in the east; Carmo do Rio Claro in the northeast, Conceição da Aparecida in the north, Nova Resende in the west and Monte Belo in the southwest. Temperatures range from 0° to 30º degrees Celsius. 75% of Alterosa's surface is undulated and 15% is mountainous.

=== Districts ===
The district of Cavacos is part of Alterosa.

== Economy ==
Alterosa has 1.300 of rural properties, approximately 25 acres each. In general, Alterosa's activities include the production of milk, meat, coffee, corn, and most recently, potatoes.

Alterosa is one of the seventeen municipalities in Minas Gerais that has a Usina de Tratamento de Resíduos Urbanos, a company that takes care of the disposal of rubbish for the citizens.

== Education ==
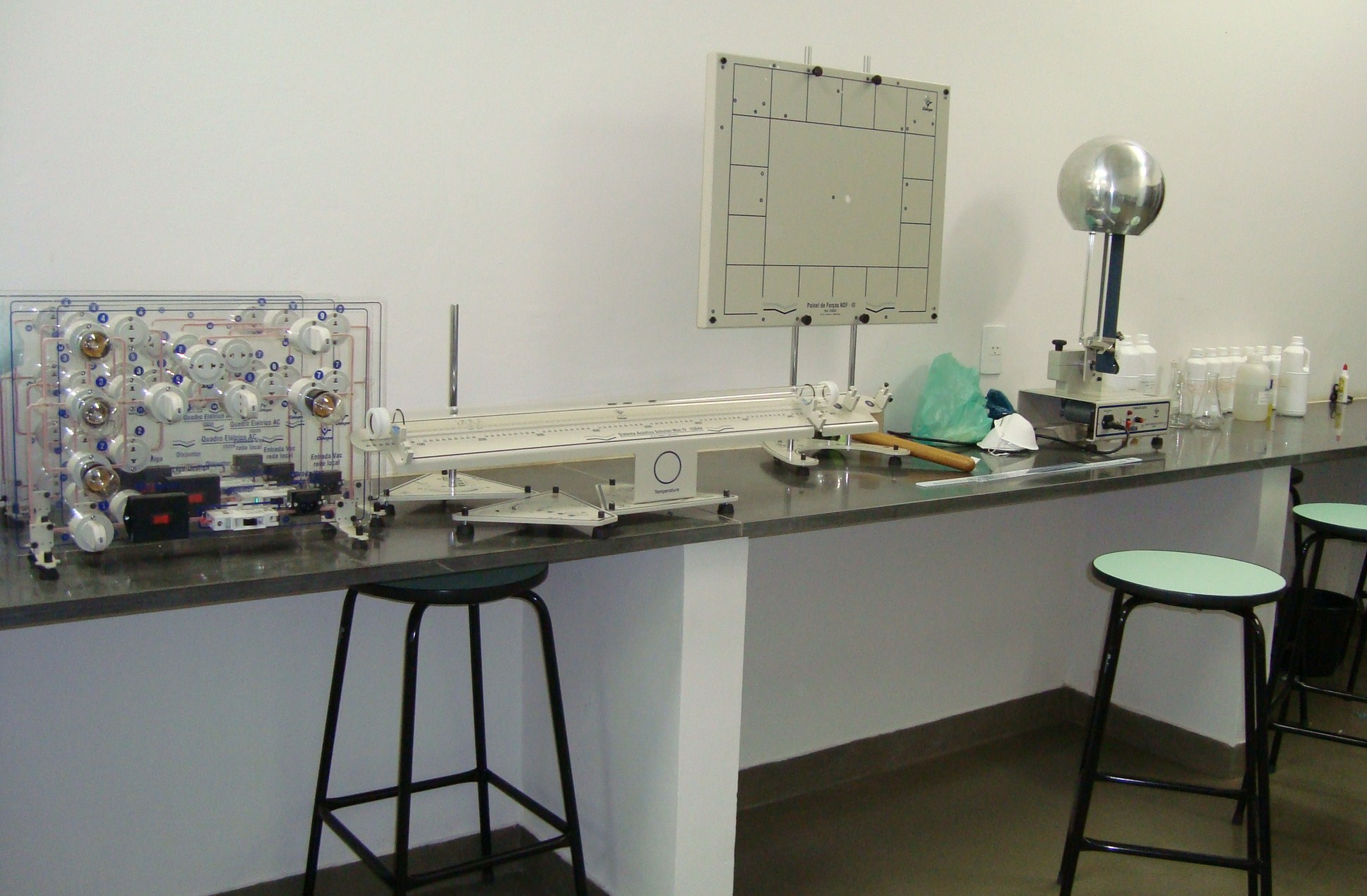
Laboratório de Física e Química do Polo de Apoio Presencial da Universidade Aberta do Brasil em Alterosa

=== Schools ===
The Prefecture of Alterosa is responsible for the four Schools existing in the city, three of them being:

- E. E. Bolivar Boanerges da Silveira
- E. E. Deputado Jales Machado
- E. E. Martins de Andrada

== Events ==
- February: Carnaval
- June: Festa Junina
- July: Festa do Peão
- August: Motorcycle owners communion
- December: City's birthday

== Communication ==
Alterosa is home of two radio stations: Serra Negra FM 102.7 and Boas Novas FM 87.9 (a Protestant radio station).

== Financial institutions ==
There are three banks in Alterosa: Banco do Brasil, Banco Bradesco and Cooperosa.
