= Marcelo Toscano =

Brazilian footballer (born 1985)

Personal information
- Full name: Marcelo Aparecido Toscano
- Date of birth: 12 May 1985 (age 41)
- Place of birth: Areado, Brazil
- Height: 1.84 m (6 ft 1/2 in)
- Position: Striker

Senior career*
Years	Team	Apps	(Gls)
2006–2009	Paulista	35	(5)
2006	→ Mirassol (loan)		
2006–2007	→ Maccabi Ahi Nazareth (loan)	29	(7)
2008	→ União São João (loan)	21	(8)
2008–2009	→ Lausanne (loan)	5	(0)
2009–2010	Paraná	45	(18)
2010–2012	Vitória Guimarães	61	(12)
2013	Figueirense	27	(8)
2014–2015	Comercial-SP	10	(3)
2014	Vila Nova	10	(0)
2014	Cuiabá	12	(3)
2015	Mirassol	18	(13)
2015	América Mineiro	35	(14)
2016–2017	Jeju United FC	50	(17)
2017–2018	Omiya Ardija	30	(1)
2019–2021	América Mineiro	79	(6)
2020	→ Mirassol (loan)	5	(0)
2022	Paysandu	1	(0)
2024	Thrissur Magic		
- * Club domestic league appearances and goals

Marcelo Aparecido Toscano (born 12 May 1985) is a Brazilian professional footballer who last played for the Super League Kerala club Thrissur Magic. Mainly a striker, he can also play as a winger.

== Club career ==
Born in Areado, Minas Gerais, Toscano was a São Vicente youth graduate. Initially a forward, he was converted to a right back during his time at Paulista, mainly due to the lack of goals.

Back as a striker at Paraná, Toscano scored ten goals in 2009 Campeonato Brasileiro Série B, being the club's top goalscorer. On 20 August 2010 he moved abroad for the first time in his career, after agreeing to a four-year deal with Primeira Liga side Vitória de Guimarães.

Toscano made his debut in the main category of Portuguese football on 28 August, starting and scoring a hat-trick in a 3–1 away win against C.D. Nacional. On 21 December 2012 he rescinded his contract, and signed for Figueirense on the following day.

Toscano appeared rarely for Figueira, and subsequently joined Comercial de Ribeirão Preto. On 14 April 2014 he moved to Vila Nova, but rescinded his link only two months later.

Toscano finished the year with Cuiabá, scoring three goals in Série C. In November 2014 he joined Mirassol, and was the top goalscorer in 2015 Campeonato Paulista Série A2.

On 16 April 2015 Toscano moved to Série B side América Mineiro.

Having successfully gotten América Mineiro promoted to the Série A, Toscano signed for Jeju United FC on 7 December 2015. After one and a half seasons playing for Jeju, he transferred to Omiya Ardija in the J. League Division 1 in June, 2017. He finished his time at Jeju with 49 league appearances and 17 goals.

On 29 July 2017 Toscano made his first appearance against Vissel Kobe scoring a goal on his debut however the game concluded with 3–1 away defeat. In his first season with Omiya Ardija they were relegated to Japan's second division J2 League.

On 1 January 2019 Toscano resigned with Série B side América Mineiro to a two-year contract.

On 27 December 2019 Toscano was loaned out to Mirassol until the end of December 2020.

== Honours ==
Vitória de Guimarães

- Taça de Portugal: 2012–13
