= Areado =

Brazilian municipality

Coordinates: 21°21′32″S 46°08′45″W

- Municipality
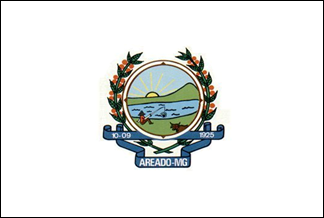
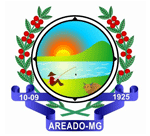
- Flag Coat of arms
- Interactive map of Areado
- Country: Brazil
- State: Minas Gerais
- Region: Southeast
- Time zone: UTC−3 (BRT)

Location of Areado within Minas Gerais

Areado is a Brazilian municipality in the state of Minas Gerais. As of 2020, its population was estimated to be 15,181. Most of the population lives in the city. The estimated population living in the city was 9,790. This city is the most urban city among the small cities nearby.

The city has an area of 281 square kilometers. The population density is about 46, which is far more than the nearest city, Alterosa, which has a population density of just 37.

The city is located near the Furnas' dam.

== See also ==
- List of municipalities in Minas Gerais
