= Rafael Silva (footballer, born 1992) =

Brazilian footballer

Personal information
- Full name: Rafael da Silva
- Date of birth: 4 April 1992 (age 34)
- Place of birth: São Paulo, Brazil
- Height: 1.79 m (5 ft 10 in)
- Position: Forward

Team information
- Current team: Vila Nova
- Number: 9

Youth career
- Corinthians

Senior career*
Years	Team	Apps	(Gls)
2012	Coritiba	7	(0)
2013–2014	Lugano	29	(12)
2014–2016	Albirex Niigata	47	(19)
2017	Urawa Red Diamonds	25	(12)
2018–2022	Wuhan Yangtze River	42	(31)
2022	Cruzeiro	16	(6)
2023	Jeonbuk Hyundai Motors	25	(3)
2024–2025	Cruzeiro	12	(3)
2025	Mirassol	1	(0)
2025	→ América Mineiro (loan)	10	(0)
2026–	Vila Nova	13	(2)
- * Club domestic league appearances and goals as of 14 April 2026

Rafael da Silva (Brazilian Portuguese: [ʁafaˈɛw dɐ ˈsiwvɐ]; born 4 April 1992) is a Brazilian professional footballer who plays as a forward for Série B club Vila Nova.

== Early life ==
Rafael was born in São Paulo.

== Club career ==
Rafael Silva started his professional football career with Campeonato Brasileiro Série A side Coritiba in the 2012 league season. He would make his debut on 8 April 2012 against Cianorte in the Campeonato Paranaense in a 3–1 victory. This would be followed by his first goal for the club on 29 April 2012 against Roma Apucarana in the Campeonato Paranaense in a 3–1 win.

Rafael joined Albirex Niigata in August 2014 from Swiss Challenge League club Lugano. He made his debut for the club in a 2–0 away loss to Sanfrecce Hiroshima on 20 September 2014. He scored his first goal for the club against Kawasaki Frontale on 5 October. After three seasons with Albirex Niigata he would move to another Japanese club in Urawa Red Diamonds where in his debut season he immediately established himself as a vital member of the team that went on to win the 2017 AFC Champions League.

On 3 February 2018, Rafael transferred to second tier Chinese football club Wuhan Zall. He would make his debut and score his first goal for the club on 11 March 2018 in a league game against Shanghai Shenxin in a 1–0 victory. He would go on to establish himself as a vital member of the team and he would win the division as well as gaining promotion at the end of the 2018 China League One campaign.

== Career statistics ==
As of match played on 23 November 2025

Appearances and goals by club, season and competition
Club	Season	League			State League		National Cup		League Cup		Continental		Other		Total	
Club	Season	Division	Apps	Goals	Apps	Goals	Apps	Goals	Apps	Goals	Apps	Goals	Apps	Goals	Apps	Goals
Coritiba	2012	Série A	7	0	2 (Note: Appearance(s) in Campeonato Paranaense)	1	3	0	—		—		—		12	1
Coritiba	2013	Série A	0	0	8	0	—		—		0	0	—		8	0
Coritiba	Total		7	0	10	1	3	0	—		0	0	—		20	1
Lugano	2013–14	Swiss Challenge League	26	9	—		1	0	—		—		—		27	9
Lugano	2014–15	Swiss Challenge League	3	3	—		0	0	—		—		—		3	3
Lugano	Total		29	12	—		1	0	—		—		—		30	12
Albirex Niigata	2014	J1 League	7	1	—		0	0	—		—		—		7	1
Albirex Niigata	2015	J1 League	17	7	—		2	1	9	2	—		—		28	10
Albirex Niigata	2016	J1 League	23	11	—		0	0	2	0	—		—		25	11
Albirex Niigata	Total		47	19	—		2	1	11	2	—		—		60	22
Urawa Red Diamonds	2017	J1 League	25	12	—		1	0	2	0	11	9	3	0	42	21
Wuhan Zall/ Wuhan	2018	China League One	23	22	—		0	0	—		—		—		23	22
Wuhan Zall/ Wuhan	2019	Chinese Super League	15	8	—		0	0	—		—		—		15	8
Wuhan Zall/ Wuhan	2020	Chinese Super League	0	0	—		0	0	—		—		0 (Note: Appearance(s) in CSL Relegation play-offs)	0	0	0
Wuhan Zall/ Wuhan	2021	Chinese Super League	4	1	—		0	0	—		—		—		4	1
Wuhan Zall/ Wuhan	Total		42	31	—		0	0	—		—		0	0	42	31
Cruzeiro	2022	Série B	16	6	—		2	0	—		—		—		18	6
Jeonbuk Hyundai Motors	2023	K League 1	24	3	—		1	0	–		0	0	—		25	3
Cruzeiro	2024	Série A	9	3	3	0	0	0	—		5	1	—		17	4
Mirassol	2025	Série A	0	0	1	0	—		—		—		—		1	0
América Mineiro (loan)	2025	Série B	10	0	—		—		—		—		—		10	0
Career total			209	86	14	1	9	1	13	2	16	10	3	0	264	100

== Honours ==
=== Club ===
Coritiba

- Campeonato Paranaense: 2012, 2013

Urawa Red Diamonds

- AFC Champions League: 2017

Wuhan Zall

- China League One: 2018
