= Rhayner =

Brazilian footballer

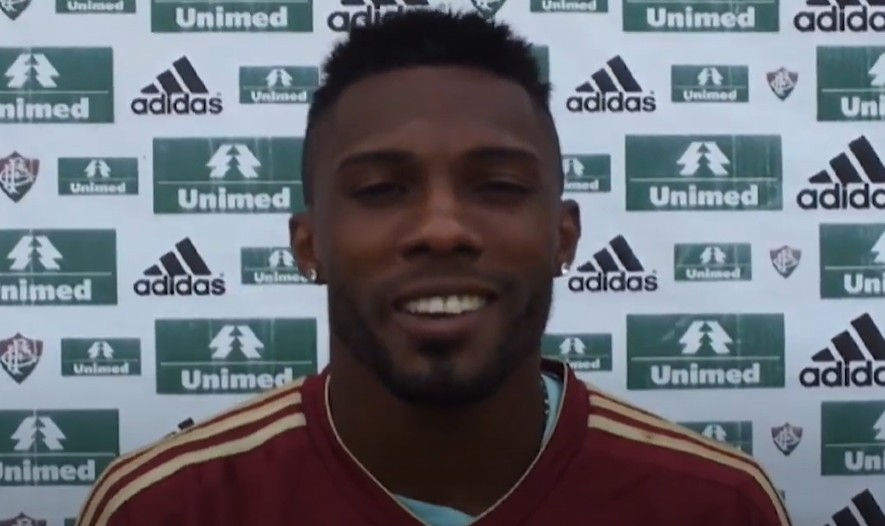
- Rhayner in 2013

Personal information
- Full name: Rhayner Santos Nascimento
- Date of birth: 5 September 1990 (age 36)
- Place of birth: Serra, Brazil
- Height: 1.79 m (5 ft 10 in)
- Position: Attacking midfielder

Team information
- Current team: CSA (on loan from Tombense)

Youth career
- 2008–2009: Laranjeiras
- 2008–2009: → Grêmio Prudente (loan)
- 2009: Grêmio Prudente

Senior career*
Years	Team	Apps	(Gls)
2009–2011	Grêmio Prudente	9	(2)
2009	→ Marília (loan)		
2010	→ Cascavel (loan)		
2011	Figueirense	14	(0)
2012	Linense	0	(0)
2012	Náutico	34	(0)
2013	Fluminense	22	(1)
2014	Bahia	12	(0)
2015	Vitória	31	(6)
2016–2017	Ponte Preta	23	(2)
2017	→ Kawasaki Frontale (loan)	26	(3)
2018	Vitória	20	(1)
2019–	Tombense	1	(0)
2019–2021	→ Sanfrecce Hiroshima (loan)	42	(2)
2022	→ Yokohama FC (loan)	21	(0)
2023–	→ CSA (loan)	0	(0)
- * Club domestic league appearances and goals as of 24 June 2023

Rhayner Santos Nascimento (born 5 September 1990), simply known as Rhayner, is a Brazilian professional footballer who plays as an attacking midfielder for CSA on loan from Tombense.

== Career ==
Rhayner started his professional career Grêmio Prudente where he left in the beginning of 2011. On 15 May 2011, he joined the Brazilian Série A side Figueirense on a free transfer from Grêmio Barueri/Prudente, in Figueirense, he played 24 games total scoring 1 goal. In 2012, he tried his luck in São Paulo state championship on Linense, a local club. Also in 2012 Rhayner signed for Náutico, there he played 34 games and he made one goal! For the 2013 season he signed for Brazilian champion Fluminense.

In March 2019, he joined Sanfrecce Hiroshima on loan until December 2019.

== Career statistics ==
As of 30 July 2023

Appearances and goals by club, season and competition
Club	Season	League			State League		National cup		League cup		Continental		Other		Total	
Club	Season	Division	Apps	Goals	Apps	Goals	Apps	Goals	Apps	Goals	Apps	Goals	Apps	Goals	Apps	Goals
Grêmio Prudente	2010	Série A	9	2	–		–		–		–		–		9	2
Grêmio Prudente	2011	Série B	–		12	1	3	0	–		–		–		15	1
Grêmio Prudente	Total		9	2	12	1	3	0	0	0	0	0	0	0	24	3
Tombense	2012	–			6	0	–		–		–		–		6	0
Figueirense (loan)	2011	Série A	14	0	–		–		–		–		–		14	0
Linense (loan)	2012	–			6	0	–		–		–		–		6	0
Náutico (loan)	2012	Série A	34	0	–		–		–		–		–		34	0
Fluminense (loan)	2013	Série A	22	1	16	2	0	0	–		9	1	–		47	4
Bahia (loan)	2014	Série A	12	0	10	2	1	0	–		2	0	5	2	30	4
Vitória (loan)	2015	Série B	31	6	4	0	2	0	–		–		5	2	30	4
Ponte Preta (loan)	2016	Série B	23	2	10	0	4	0	–		–		–		37	2
Kawasaki Frontale (loan)	2017	J1 League	14	1	–		3	0	2	0	7	2	–		26	3
Vitória	2018	Série A	20	1	3	0	6	0	–		–		4	1	33	1
Tombense	2023	Série B	1	0	0	0	0	0	–		–		1	0		
Sanfrecce Hiroshima (loan)	2019	J1 League	24	2	–		2	1	2	0	0	0	–		28	3
Sanfrecce Hiroshima (loan)	2020	J1 League	18	0	–		–		2	0	–		–		20	0
Sanfrecce Hiroshima (loan)	2021	J1 League	26	1	–		1	0	4	0	–		–		31	1
Sanfrecce Hiroshima (loan)	Total		68	3	0	0	3	1	8	0	0	0	0	0	79	4
Yokohama FC (loan)	2022	J2 League	21	0	–		0	0	–		–		–		21	0
CSA (loan)	2023	Série C	3	0	–		–		–		–		–		3	0
Career total			272	16	67	5	22	1	10	0	18	3	14	5	378	25
