= Hettikamkanamge Perera =

Sri Lankan football referee

- Full name: Crishantha Dilan Perera Hettikankanamge
- Born: 19 September 1978 (age 48); Kalutara, Sri Lanka

Domestic
Years	League	Role

International
Years	League	Role
2004–	FIFA listed	Referee

Crishantha Dilan Perera Hettikankanamge (born 19 September 1978) is a Sri Lankan professional football referee. He has been a full international for FIFA since 2004. He refereed some matches in AFC Champions League.

== AFC Asian Cup ==
2019 AFC Asian Cup – United Arab Emirates
Date	Match	Venue	Round
13 January 2019	North Korea – Qatar	Al Ain	Group stage

Preceded by (Qatar) Abdulrahman Al-Jassim	AFC Cup final match referees 2019 (Sri Lanka) Hettikamkanamge Perera	Succeeded by Incumbent
