= Khamis Al-Marri =

Qatari football referee

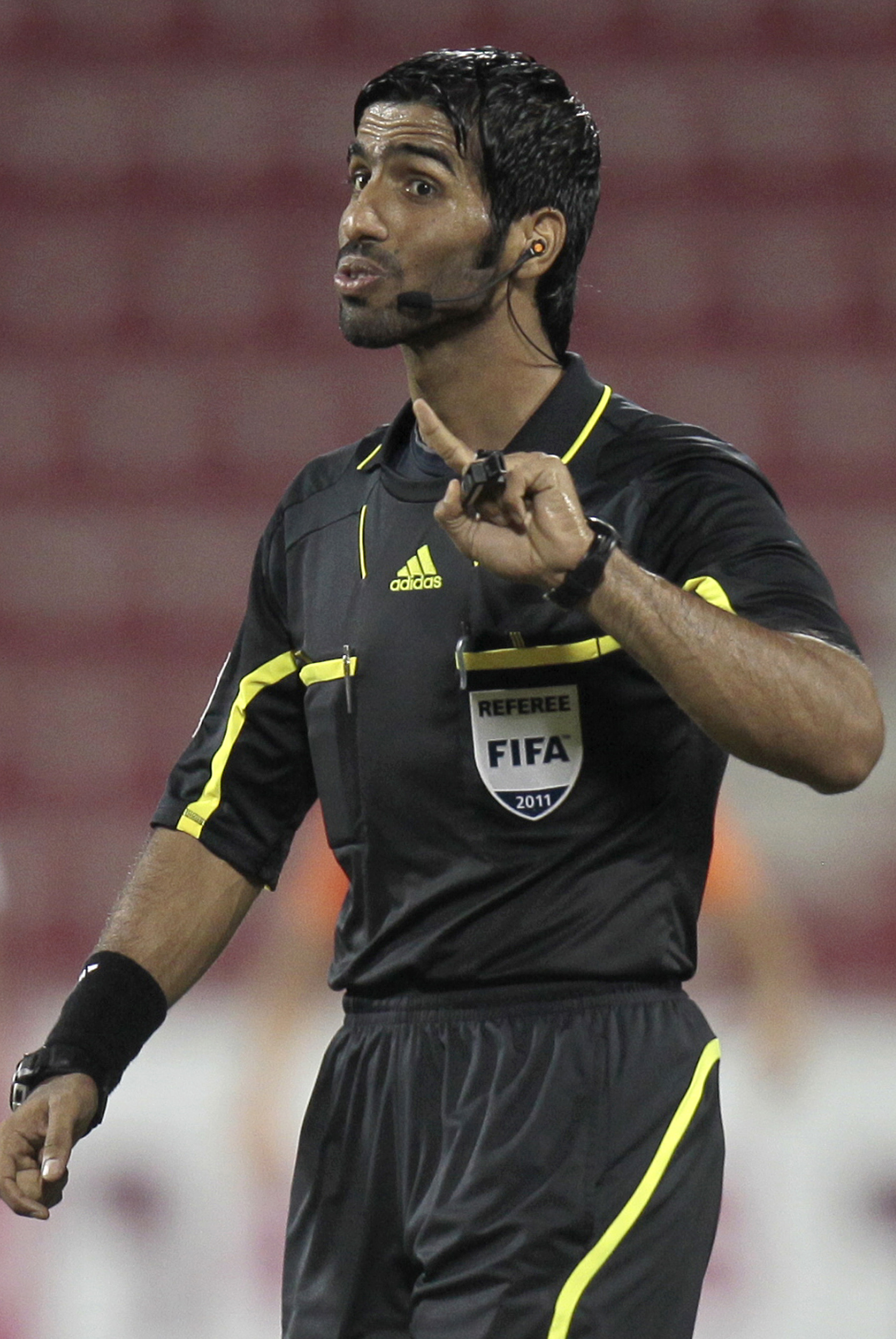
- Al-Marri in 2011
- Full name: Khamis Mohammed Al-Marri
- Born: 6 July 1984 (age 42); Qatar

International
Years	League	Role
2010–2025	FIFA	Referee
2023-	FIFA	Video assistant referee

Khamis Mohammed Al-Marri (born 6 July 1984) is a Qatari football referee and video match official who has been a listed international referee for FIFA and the AFC since 2010. He also officiates in the Qatar Stars League. In recent international competitions he has worked mainly as a video assistant referee, including at the 2024 Summer Olympics, the 2025 FIFA Club World Cup and the 2026 FIFA World Cup. He was the Support Video Assistant Referee for the 2026 FIFA World Cup Final.

== Career ==
Al-Marri was summoned for the 2018 FIFA World Cup qualification in Russia as part of the AFC contingent, working 12 matches beginning with a match between Nepal and India.

He was also summoned at the 2019 AFC Asian Cup in the United Arab Emirates.

Al-Marri was once again summoned at the 2023 AFC Asian Cup in Qatar.

In July 2024 Al-Marri was named among the match officials for the football tournament at the 2024 Summer Olympics in Paris, where he was part of the video assistant referee team.

At the 2025 FIFA Club World Cup in the United States he served as a video assistant referee, including the quarter-final between Chelsea and Palmeiras on 4 July 2025, which the website ILoveQatar reported as his third video-assistant appointment of the tournament.

In 2025 he was one of four Qatari officials selected by FIFA for the 2025 FIFA Arab Cup in Qatar.

In April 2026 Al-Marri was named one of the video assistant referees for the 2026 FIFA World Cup, part of a four-strong Qatari contingent that also included assistant referees Taleb Al-Marri and Saud Al-Maqaleh. During the tournament he was appointed video assistant referee for the group-stage match between Portugal and DR Congo, behind an all-Qatari officiating team led by Abdulrahman Al-Jassim. He was later named the SVAR for the final.
