= 2015–16 Southern District RSA season =

KC Southern
2015–16 season
- Chairman: Wong Ling Sun
- Head coach: Cheng Siu Chung
- Home ground: Aberdeen Sports Ground (Capacity: 4,000)
- Premier League: 4th
- Senior Shield: TBC
- FA Cup: TBC
Home colours	Away colours

The 2015–16 season is Southern Districtn RSA's 14th competitive season and the first season in the Hong Kong Premier League, the top-tier division in Hong Kong football, since 2014. Southern will compete in the Premier League, Senior Challenge Shield and FA Cup in this season.

== Key events ==
- 5 May 2015: Former head coach Fung Hoi Man confirmed his departure at the end of 2014–15 season.
- 8 May 2015: The club appointed former Kitchee assistant coach Cheng Siu Chung as their head coach.
- 2 June 2015: Hong Kong goalkeeper Tse Tak Him joins the club from Sun Pegasus for free.
- 3 June 2015: Hong Konbg defender Sham Kwok Fai joins the club from Sun Pegasus for free. On the other hand, Spanish free agent striker Jonathan Carril re-joins the club.
- 6 June 2015: Brazilian defender Tomas Maronesi joins the club from Wong Tai Sin on a free transfer.
- 10 June 2015: Hong Kong midfielder Leung Tsz Chun joins the club from Eastern for an undisclosed fee.
- 12 June 2015: Hong Kong striker James Stephen Gee Ha joins the club from Biu Chun Rangers for an undisclosed fee.
- 20 June 2015: Hong Kong defender Shay Spitz joins the club from Biu Chun Rangers on a free transfer.
- 20 June 2015: The club extended contracts with three players, including Lam Ho Kwan, Lo Wai Tat, Kwok Ting Him.
- 24 June 2015: The club extended contract with goalkeeper Wong Tsz Him.
- 25 June 2015: Brazilian winger Wellingsson de Souza joins the club from I-Sky Yuen Long on a free transfer.
- 5 July 2015: Spanish defender Diego Garrido Garcia joins the club from La Roda CF on a free transfer.
- 11 July 2015: Hong Kong midfielder Luk Chi Ho Michael joins the club from Eastern for an undisclosed fee.
- 13 July 2015: Spanish midfielder José María Díaz Muñoz re-joins the club from YFCMD on a free transfer.
- 13 July 2015: Hong Kong midfielder Emmet Wan, Ho Chuck Hang and defender Wang Hecun join the club on loan from Kitchee until the end of the season.
- 15 July 2015: Hong Kong defender Chan Cham Hei joins the club from Lung Moon on a free transfer.
- 1 August 2015: Hong Kong defender Chan Kong Pan joins the club from Sun Pegasus on a free transfer.
- 22 September 2015: Hong Kong defender Leung Robson Augusto Ka Hai joins the club from Kitchee on loan until the end of the season.

== Players ==
=== Squad information ===
N	P	Nat.	Name	Date of birth	Age	Since	Previous club	Notes
1	GK	(Hong Kong)	Wong Tsz Him^{LP}	5 June 1990	25	2014	(Hong Kong) Sunray Cave JC Sun Hei	
2	DF	(Hong Kong)	Sham Kwok Fai^{LP}	30 May 1984	31	2015	(Hong Kong) Sun Pegasus	
3	DF	(Hong Kong)	Shay Spitz^{LP}	27 January 1988	27	2015	(Hong Kong) Biu Chun Rangers	Second nationality: United States
4	DF	(Hong Kong)	Chan Cham Hei^{LP}	17 June 1991	24	2015	(Hong Kong) Lung Moon	
5	DF	(Spain)	Diego Garrido Garcia^{FP}	20 June 1984	31	2015	(Spain) La Roda	
6	MF	(Spain)	José María Díaz Muñoz^{FP}	4 July 1982	33	2015	(Hong Kong) YFCMD	
7	MF	(Hong Kong)	Leung Tsz Chun^{LP}	19 May 1985	30	2015	(Hong Kong) Eastern	
8	MF	(Hong Kong)	Luk Michael Chi Ho^{LP}	22 August 1986	29	2015	(Hong Kong) Eastern	
9	FW	(Spain)	Jonathan Carril^{FP}	28 February 1984	31	2015	Free Agent	
11	FW	(Brazil)	Wellingsson de Souza^{FP}	7 September 1989	25	2015	(Hong Kong) I-Sky Yuen Long	
12	MF	(Hong Kong)	Ho Chuck Hang^{LP}	May 1997	18	2015	(Hong Kong) Kitchee	On loan from Kitchee
13	DF	(Hong Kong)	Lam Ho Kwan^{LP}	7 April 1987	27	2004	Youth system	Team captain
14	FW	(Hong Kong)	James Stephen Gee Ha^{FP}	26 December 1992	22	2015	(Hong Kong) Biu Chun Rangers	
15	MF	(Hong Kong)	Kwok Ting Him^{LP}	28 December 1994	20	2009	Youth system	
16	MF	(Hong Kong)	Emmet Wan^{LP}	13 March 1992	23	2015	(Hong Kong) Kitchee	On loan from Kitchee
17	MF	(Hong Kong)	Lo Wai Tat^{LP}	21 September 1985	28	2004	Youth system	
18	DF	(Hong Kong)	Wang Hecun^{LP}	26 December 1996	18	2015	(Hong Kong) Kitchee	On loan from Kitchee
19	DF	(Hong Kong)	Chan Kong Pan^{LP}	13 April 1996	19	2015	(Hong Kong) Sun Pegasus	
22	DF	(Brazil)	Tomas Maronesi^{FP}	7 April 1985	30	2015	(Hong Kong) Wong Tai Sin	
29	GK	(Hong Kong)	Tse Tak Him^{LP}	10 February 1985	30	2015	(Hong Kong) Sun Pegasus	
30	DF	(Hong Kong)	Leung Robson Augusto Ka Hai^{LP}	22 April 1993	22	2008	Youth system	Second nationality: Brazil; On loan from Kitchee

Last update: 1 August 2015
Source: Southern District RSA
Ordered by squad number.
^{LP}Local player; ^{FP}Foreign player; ^{NR}Non-registered player

== Transfers ==
=== In ===
==== Summer ====
No.	Pos	Player	Transferred From	Fee	Date	Source
29	GK	(Hong Kong) Tse Tak Him	(Hong Kong) Sun Pegasus	Free transfer	2 June 2015	
2	DF	(Hong Kong) Sham Kwok Keung	(Hong Kong) Sun Pegasus	Free transfer	3 June 2015	
9	FW	(Spain) Jonathan Carril	Free Agent	Free transfer	3 June 2015	
6	DF	(Brazil) Tomas Maronesi	(Hong Kong) Wong Tai Sin	Free transfer	6 June 2015	
7	MF	(Hong Kong) Leung Tsz Chun	(Hong Kong) Eastern	Undisclosed	10 June 2015	
14	FW	(Hong Kong) James Stephen Gee Ha	(Hong Kong) Biu Chun Rangers	Undisclosed	12 June 2015	
3	DF	(Hong Kong) Shay Spitz	(Hong Kong) Biu Chun Rangers	Free transfer	20 June 2015	
11	FW	(Brazil) Wellingsson de Souza	(Hong Kong) I-Sky Yuen Long	Free transfer	25 June 2015	
5	DF	(Spain) Diego Garrido Garcia	(Spain) La Roda	Free transfer	5 July 2015	
8	MF	(Hong Kong) Luk Michael Chi Ho	(Hong Kong) Eastern	Free transfer	11 July 2015	
6	MF	(Spain) José María Díaz Muñoz	(Hong Kong) YFCMD	Free transfer	13 July 2015	
4	DF	(Hong Kong) Chan Cham Hei	(Hong Kong) Lung Moon	Free transfer	15 July 2015	
19	DF	(Hong Kong) Chan Kong Pan	(Hong Kong) Sun Pegasus	Free transfer	1 August 2015	

=== Out ===
==== Summer ====
No.	Pos	Player	Transferred To	Fee	Date	Source
1	GK	(Hong Kong) Cheng Ting Hei	Unattached	Free transfer	30 May 2015	
2	DF	(Hong Kong) To Philip Michael	Unattached	Free transfer	30 May 2015	
3	DF	(Hong Kong) Chau Chi Ming	Unattached	Free transfer	30 May 2015	
4	DF	(Spain) Lander Panera Arteagabeitia	Unattached	Free transfer	30 May 2015	
5	MF	(Hong Kong) Ho Min Tong	Unattached	Free transfer	30 May 2015	
6	DF	(Hong Kong) Chiu Kwok Keung	Unattached	Free transfer	30 May 2015	
8	MF	(Hong Kong) Yau Tsing On	Unattached	Free transfer	30 May 2015	
9	MF	(Hong Kong) Ko Chun	Unattached	Free transfer	30 May 2015	
13	DF	(Hong Kong) Ha Shing Chi	Unattached	Free transfer	30 May 2015	
14	MF	(Hong Kong) Chow Ka Wa	Unattached	Free transfer	30 May 2015	
15	DF	(Hong Kong) Lee Kai Chi	Unattached	Free transfer	30 May 2015	
16	DF	(Hong Kong) Leung Kam Fai	Unattached	Free transfer	30 May 2015	
17	FW	(Hong Kong) Ho Chun Hin	Unattached	Free transfer	30 May 2015	
18	MF	(Hong Kong) Leung Kai Ho	Unattached	Free transfer	30 May 2015	
19	DF	(Hong Kong) Chui Yiu Chung	Unattached	Free transfer	30 May 2015	
23	MF	(Hong Kong) Ng Siu Fai	Unattached	Free transfer	30 May 2015	
24	GK	(Hong Kong) Tung Ho Yin	Unattached	Free transfer	30 May 2015	
28	FW	(Hong Kong) Tang Chi Chung	Unattached	Free transfer	30 May 2015	
32	FW	(Cameroon) Pierre Olivier Bakalag	Unattached	Free transfer	30 May 2015	

=== Loan in ===
==== Summer ====
No.	Pos	Player	Loaned From	Start	End	Source
12	MF	(Hong Kong) Ho Chuck Hang	(Hong Kong) Kitchee	13 July 2015	30 May 2016	
16	MF	(Hong Kong) Emmet Wan	(Hong Kong) Kitchee	13 July 2015	30 May 2016	
18	DF	(Hong Kong) Wang Hecun	(Hong Kong) Kitchee	13 July 2015	30 May 2016	
30	DF	(Hong Kong) Leung Robson Augusto Ka Hai	(Hong Kong) Kitchee	22 September 2015	30 May 2016	

=== Loan out ===
==== Summer ====
No.	Pos	Player	Loaned To	Start	End	Source

== Club ==
=== Coaching staff ===
Position	Staff
Head Coach	(Hong Kong) Cheng Siu Chung
Goalkeeper Coach	(Hong Kong) Tung Ho Yin

Last updated: 18 July 2015
Source: Southern District RSA

== Squad statistics ==
=== Overall stats ===
	League	Senior Shield	FA Cup	Total Stats
Games played	0	0	0	0
Games won	0	0	0	0
Games drawn	0	0	0	0
Games lost	0	0	0	0
Goals for	0	0	0	0
Goals against	0	0	0	0
Players used	0	0	0	0
Yellow cards	0	0	0	0
Red cards	0	0	0	0

Last updated: 18 July 2015
Source: Player Stats

=== Squad stats ===
				Total				Hong Kong Premier League		Senior Shield		FA Cup		
N	Pos.	Name	Nat.	GS	App	Gls	Min	App	Gls	App	Gls	App	Gls	Notes
1	GK	Wong Tsz Him	(Hong Kong)											(−) GA
29	GK	Tse Tak Him	(Hong Kong)											(−) GA
2	RB	Sham Kwok Fai	(Hong Kong)											
3	LB	Shay Spitz	(Hong Kong)											
4	LB	Chan Cham Hei	(Hong Kong)											
5	CB	Diego Garrido Garcia	(Spain)											
13	CB	Lam Ho Kwan	(Hong Kong)											
18	LB	Wang Hecun	(Hong Kong)											
19	RB	Chan Kong Pan	(Hong Kong)											
22	CB	Tomas Maronesi	(Brazil)											
6	DM	José María Díaz Muñoz	(Spain)											
7	RM	Leung Tsz Chun	(Hong Kong)											
8	CM	Luk Michael Chi Ho	(Hong Kong)											
12	RM	Ho Chuck Hang	(Hong Kong)											
15	AM	Kwok Ting Him	(Hong Kong)											
16	CM	Emmet Wan	(Hong Kong)											
17	CM	Lo Wai Tat	(Hong Kong)											
9	ST	Jonathan Carril	(Spain)											
11	LW	Wellingsson de Souza	(Hong Kong)											
14	RW	James Ha	(Hong Kong)											

Last updated: 1 August 2015
Ordered by Position
0 shown as blank

=== Top scorers ===
Last updated: 18 July 2015.
Source: Hong Kong Football Association

The list is sorted by shirt number when total goals are equal.

Rnk	Pos	No.	Player	Premier League	Senior Shield	FA Cup	Total
Own goals							
TOTALS							

=== Disciplinary record ===
Includes all competitive matches.Players listed below made at least one appearance for Southern first squad during the season.

N	P	Nat.	Name	League			Shield			FA Cup			Others			Total			Notes
N	P	Nat.	Name	Yellow card	Second yellow card	Red card	Yellow card	Second yellow card	Red card	Yellow card	Second yellow card	Red card	Yellow card	Second yellow card	Red card	Yellow card	Second yellow card	Red card	Notes

Last updated: 18 July 2015
Source: Competitive matches
Ordered by (red card) , (second yellow card) and (yellow card)
(yellow card) = Number of bookings; (second yellow card) = Number of sending offs after a second yellow card; (red card) = Number of sending offs by a direct red card.

=== Substitution record ===
Includes all competitive matches.

			League		Shield		FA Cup		Others		Total	
No.	Pos	Name	subson	subsoff	subson	subsoff	subson	subsoff	subson	subsoff	subson	subsoff
Goalkeepers
1	GK	Wong Tsz Him	0	0	0	0	0	0	0	0	0	0
29	GK	Tse Tak Him	0	0	0	0	0	0	0	0	0	0
Defenders
2	RB	Sham Kwok Fai	0	0	0	0	0	0	0	0	0	0
3	LB	Shay Spitz	0	0	0	0	0	0	0	0	0	0
4	LB	Chan Cham Hei	0	0	0	0	0	0	0	0	0	0
5	CB	Garrido	0	0	0	0	0	0	0	0	0	0
13	CB	Lam Ho Kwan	0	0	0	0	0	0	0	0	0	0
18	LB	Wang Hecun	0	0	0	0	0	0	0	0	0	0
19	RB	Chan Kong Pan	0	0	0	0	0	0	0	0	0	0
22	CB	Tomas	0	0	0	0	0	0	0	0	0	0
Midfielders
6	DM	Díaz	0	0	0	0	0	0	0	0	0	0
6	RM	Leung Tsz Chun	0	0	0	0	0	0	0	0	0	0
18	CM	Luk Michael Chi Ho	0	0	0	0	0	0	0	0	0	0
12	RM	Ho Chuck Hang	0	0	0	0	0	0	0	0	0	0
15	AM	Kwok Ting Him	0	0	0	0	0	0	0	0	0	0
16	CM	Emmet Wan	0	0	0	0	0	0	0	0	0	0
17	CM	Lo Wai Tat	0	0	0	0	0	0	0	0	0	0
Forwards
9	CF	Carril	0	0	0	0	0	0	0	0	0	0
11	LW	Souza	0	0	0	0	0	0	0	0	0	0
14	RW	James Ha	0	0	0	0	0	0	0	0	0	0

Last updated: 1 August 2015

=== Captains ===
No.	P	Name	Country	No. games	Notes

Last updated: 18 July 2015
Source: Competitive match reports.
Competitive matches only
Matches started as captain only
Country: FIFA nationality; No.: Squad number; P: Position; Name: Player name; No. Games: Number of games started as captain.

== Competitions ==
=== Overall ===
Competition	Started round	Current position / round	Final position / round	First match	Last match
Hong Kong Premier League	—	4th		12 September 2015	
Senior Shield	—	—			
FA Cup	—	—			

Updated to match played 15 July 2015
Source: Competitions

=== First Division League ===
==== Classification ====
Pos	Team	Pld	W	D	L	GF	GA	GD	Pts	Qualification or relegation
2	Kitchee	16	11	4	1	32	11	+21	37	Qualification to season play-off and Champions League preliminary round 2
3	South China	16	9	2	5	26	21	+5	29	Qualification to season play-off (Note: Since the winners of the Senior Shield, Eastern, and the winners of the League Cup, Kitchee, qualified for AFC competitions and the Season Play-off respectively based on league position, the spots awarded to the Senior Shield winner and the League Cup winner for the Season Play-off were awarded to the third and fourth placed team in the league. Pegasus qualified as winners of the FA Cup.)
4	Southern	16	6	5	5	26	21	+5	23	Qualification to season play-off
5	Pegasus	16	4	5	7	22	27	−5	17	Qualification to season play-off
6	Dreams Metro Gallery	16	4	4	8	19	30	−11	16	Relegation to First Division (Note: Both Dreams Metro Gallery and Wong Tai Sin did not apply for the next season's Hong Kong Premier League Licence.)

Source: Hong Kong Football Association
Rules for classification: 1) Points; 2) Head-to-head points; 3) Head-to-head goal difference; 4) Head-to-head goals scored; 5) Goal difference; 6) Goals scored; 7) Fair-play points; 8) Drawing lots (Play-off if the winner has to be decided)

==== Results summary ====
Overall								Home						Away					
Pld	W	D	L	GF	GA	GD	Pts	W	D	L	GF	GA	GD	W	D	L	GF	GA	GD
0	0	0	0	0	0	0	0	0	0	0	0	0	0	0	0	0	0	0	0

Last updated: 18 July 2015.
Source: Premier League

== Matches ==
Win Draw Loss Void

=== Pre-season friendlies ===
24 July 2015	KC Southern (Hong Kong)	4–0	(Hong Kong) Citizen	Kowloon City, Kowloon
12:00 (UTC+8)	Díaz (2); Carril; Souza			Stadium: Kowloon Tsai Park

30 July 2015	KC Southern (Hong Kong)	6–0	Hong Kong U18	Lam Tin, Kowloon
10:15 (UTC+8)	Díaz 17', 67'; Carril 22'; Souza 26'; Michael Luk 35'; Lo Wai Tat 60'			Stadium: Sai Tso Wan Recreation Ground

7 August 2015	Guangzhou R&F B (China)	0–1	(Hong Kong) KC Southern	Guangzhou, China
16:30 (UTC+8)		Report	Tomas 90'	Stadium: Sanshui Baining Football Training Ground
