= 2015–16 Hong Kong Pegasus FC season =

Pegasus
2015–16 season
- Chairman: Canny Leung
- Head Coach: Lee Chi Kin
- Home Ground: Hong Kong Stadium (Capacity: 40,000)
- Premier League: 6th
- Senior Shield: TBC
- FA Cup: TBC
Home colours	Away colours

The 2015–16 season is Pegasus's 8th season in the top-tier division in Hong Kong football. Pegasus will compete in the Premier League, Senior Challenge Shield, FA Cup and League Cup in this season.

== Key events ==
- 27 May 2015: Hong Kong defender Deng Jinghuang announces his retirement from football.
- 1 June 2015: Hong Kong midfielder Ju Yingzhi leaves the club and joins Eastern on a free transfer.
- 2 June 2015: Hong Kong goalkeeper Tse Tak Him leaves the club and joins KC Southern for free.
- 3 June 2015: Hong Kong defender Sham Kwok Fai leaves the club and joins KC Southern for free.
- 4 June 2015: Hong Kong defender Tong Kin Man leaves the club and joins Kitchee on a free transfer.
- 9 June 2015: Hong Kong striker Chan Man Fai leaves the club and joins South China on a free transfer.
- 10 June 2015: Hong Kong So Wai Chuen announces his retirement from football.
- 19 June 2015: Hong Kong goalkeeper Ho Kwok Chuen leaves the club and joins Eastern on a free transfer.
- 23 June 2015: Nigerian defender Festus Baise leaves the club and joins Eastern on a free transfer.
- 24 June 2015: Australian goalkeeper Jerrad Tyson leaves the club and joins Perth Glory on a free transfer.
- 30 June 2015: Hong Kong midfielder Lee Hong Lim leaves the club and joins Eastern on a free transfer.
- 3 July 2015: Hong Kong midfielder Ip Chung Long and striker Yip Tsz Chun leave the club and join Yuen Long on a free transfer.
- 8 July 2015: The club announces their squad list for the season.
- 15 July 2015: Hong Kong striker Sham Kwok Keung leaves the club and joins Kitchee on a free transfer.
- 1 August 2015: Hong Kong defender Chan Kong Pan leaves the club and joins KC Southern on a free transfer.
- 20 August 2015: Brazilian midfielder João Emir Porto Pereira joins the club on a free transfer.

== Players ==
=== Squad information ===
N	P	Nat.	Name	Date of birth	Age	Since	Previous club	Notes
1	GK	(North Macedonia)	Kristijan Naumovski^{FP}	17 September 1988	27	2015	(Romania) FC Dinamo București	
3	DF	(Brazil)	Eduardo Praes^{FP}	3 November 1988	27	2015	(Brazil) EC Pelotas	
5	DF	(Hong Kong)	Leung Kwun Chung^{LP}	1 April 1992	23	2015	(Hong Kong) YFCMD	Team vice captain
6	MF	(Serbia)	Dušan Martinović^{FP}	22 December 1987	28	2015	(Serbia) FK Jagodina	
7	FW	(Hong Kong)	Wong Wai^{LP}	17 September 1992	23	2015	(Hong Kong) YFCMD	
8	MF	(Hong Kong)	Lee Ka Yiu^{LP}	10 April 1992	23	2015	(Hong Kong) YFCMD	
9	MF	(Hong Kong)	Lo Kong Wai^{LP}	19 June 1992	23	2015	(Hong Kong) South China	
10	FW	(Montenegro)	Admir Adrović^{FP}	8 May 1988	27	2015	(Bahrain) Al-Muharraq	
11	FW	(Croatia)	Ivan Miličević^{FP}	11 February 1988	27	2015	(Croatia) NK Istra 1961	
12	DF	(Hong Kong)	Leung Nok Hang^{LP}	14 November 1994	21	2015	(Hong Kong) YFCMD	
13	DF	(Hong Kong)	Wong Chun Ho^{LP}	31 May 1990	25	2015	(Hong Kong) YFCMD	
14	DF	(Hong Kong)	Fong Pak Lun^{LP}	14 April 1993	22	2015	(Hong Kong) YFCMD	
15	DF	(Hong Kong)	Fung Hing Wa^{LP}	12 December 1992	23	2015	(Hong Kong) YFCMD	
16	MF	(Hong Kong)	Tan Chun Lok^{LP}	5 January 1996	19	2015	(Hong Kong) YFCMD	
17	MF	(Hong Kong)	Chan Pak Hang^{LP}	21 November 1992	23	2012	(Hong Kong) South China	
18	DF	(Hong Kong)	Kwok Kin Pong^{LP}	30 March 1987	28	2015	(Hong Kong) Eastern	Team captain
19	MF	(Hong Kong)	Wong Lok^{LP}	23 October 1996	19	2015	(Hong Kong) Happy Valley	
20	MF	(Hong Kong)	Chan Pak Hei^{LP}	26 March 1997	18	2015	Youth system	
22	DF	(Hong Kong)	Wu Chun Ming^{LP}	21 November 1997	18	2015	Youth system	
23	FW	(Hong Kong)	Jaimes McKee^{LP}	14 April 1987	28	2011	(Hong Kong) HKFC	
26	MF	(Hong Kong)	Lee Ka Ho^{LP}	26 April 1993	22	2015	(Hong Kong) YFCMD	
30	GK	(Hong Kong)	Wong Tsz Chung^{LP}	16 June 1995	20	2015	(Hong Kong) Sunray Cave JC Sun Hei	
31	FW	(Hong Kong)	Cheng Lai Hin^{LP}	31 March 1986	29	2015	(Hong Kong) South China	
88	GK	(Hong Kong)	Yuen Ho Chun^{LP}	19 July 1995	20	2015	(Hong Kong) Wofoo Tai Po	
89	MF	(Brazil)	João Emir Porto Pereira^{LP}	17 March 1989	26	2015	Free agent	

As of 10 September 2015

Source: Pegasus FC
Ordered by squad number.
^{LP}Local player; ^{FP}Foreign player; ^{NR}Non-registered player

== Transfers ==
=== In ===
==== Summer ====
No.	Pos	Player	Transferred From	Fee	Date	Source
1	GK	(North Macedonia) Kristijan Naumovski	(Romania) FC Dinamo București	Free transfer	8 July 2015	
3	DF	(Brazil) Eduardo Praes	(Brazil) EC Pelotas	Free transfer	8 July 2015	
5	DF	(Hong Kong) Leung Kwun Chung	(Hong Kong) YFCMD	Free transfer	8 July 2015	
6	MF	(Serbia) Dušan Martinović	(Serbia) FK Jagodina	Free transfer	8 July 2015	
7	MF	(Hong Kong) Wong Wai	(Hong Kong) YFCMD	Free transfer	8 July 2015	
8	MF	(Hong Kong) Lee Ka Yiu	(Hong Kong) YFCMD	Free transfer	8 July 2015	
9	MF	(Hong Kong) Lo Kong Wai	(Hong Kong) South China	Free transfer	8 July 2015	
10	FW	(Montenegro) Admir Adrović	(Bahrain) Al-Muharraq	Free transfer	8 July 2015	
11	FW	(Croatia) Ivan Miličević	(Croatia) NK Istra 1961	Free transfer	8 July 2015	
12	DF	(Hong Kong) Leung Nok Hang	(Hong Kong) YFCMD	Free transfer	8 July 2015	
13	DF	(Hong Kong) Wong Chun Ho	(Hong Kong) YFCMD	Free transfer	8 July 2015	
14	DF	(Hong Kong) Fong Pak Lun	(Hong Kong) YFCMD	Free transfer	8 July 2015	
15	DF	(Hong Kong) Fung Hing Wa	(Hong Kong) YFCMD	Free transfer	8 July 2015	
16	MF	(Hong Kong) Tan Chun Lok	(Hong Kong) YFCMD	Free transfer	8 July 2015	
18	DF	(Hong Kong) Kwok Kin Pong	(Hong Kong) Eastern	Free transfer	8 July 2015	
19	MF	(Hong Kong) Wong Lok	(Hong Kong) Happy Valley	Free transfer	8 July 2015	
26	MF	(Hong Kong) Lee Ka Ho	(Hong Kong) YFCMD	Free transfer	8 July 2015	
30	GK	(Hong Kong) Wong Tsz Chung	(Hong Kong) Sunray Cave JC Sun Hei	Free transfer	8 July 2015	
31	FW	(Hong Kong) Cheng Lai Hin	(Hong Kong) South China	Free transfer	8 July 2015	
88	GK	(Hong Kong) Yuen Ho Chun	(Hong Kong) Wofoo Tai Po	Free transfer	8 July 2015	
89	MF	(Brazil) João Emir Porto Pereira	Free agent	Free transfer	20 August 2015	

=== Out ===
==== Summer ====
No.	Pos	Player	Transferred To	Fee	Date	Source
4	DF	(Hong Kong) Deng Jinghuang	Retired	N/A	27 May 2015	
7	FW	(Romania) Petrișor Voinea	(Romania) FC Petrolul Ploiești	Free transfer	31 May 2015	
9	FW	(Bosnia and Herzegovina) Admir Raščić	(Bosnia and Herzegovina) FK Olimpic	Free transfer	31 May 2015	
20	DF	(Serbia) Igor Miović		End of contract	31 May 2015	
24	MF	(Hong Kong) Ju Yingzhi	(Hong Kong) Eastern	Free transfer	1 June 2015	
29	GK	(Hong Kong) Tse Tak Him	(Hong Kong) KC Southern	Free transfer	2 June 2015	
2	DF	(Hong Kong) Sham Kwok Fai	(Hong Kong) KC Southern	Free transfer	3 June 2015	
21	DF	(Hong Kong) Tong Kin Man	(Hong Kong) Kitchee	Free transfer	4 June 2015	
19	FW	(Hong Kong) Chan Man Fai	(Hong Kong) South China	Free transfer	9 June 2015	
33	DF	(Hong Kong) So Wai Chuen	Retired	N/A	10 June 2015	
16	GK	(Hong Kong) Ho Kwok Chuen	(Hong Kong) Eastern	Free transfer	19 June 2015	
77	DF	(Hong Kong) Festus Baise	(Hong Kong) Eastern	Free transfer	23 June 2015	
1	GK	(Australia) Jerrad Tyson	(Australia) Perth Glory	Free transfer	24 June 2015	
11	MF	(Hong Kong) Lee Hong Lim	(Hong Kong) Eastern	Free transfer	30 June 2015	
25	MF	(Hong Kong) Ip Chung Long	(Hong Kong) Yuen Long	Free transfer	3 July 2015	
38	FW	(Hong Kong) Yip Tsz Chun	(Hong Kong) Yuen Long	Free transfer	3 July 2015	
18	FW	(Hong Kong) Sham Kwok Keung	(Hong Kong) Kitchee	Free transfer	15 July 2015	
34	DF	(Hong Kong) Chan Kong Pan	(Hong Kong) KC Southern	Free transfer	1 August 2015	

=== Loan In ===
==== Summer ====
No.	Pos	Player	Loaned From	Start	End	Source

=== Loan Out ===
==== Summer ====
No.	Pos	Player	Loaned To	Start	End	Source

== Club ==
=== Coaching staff ===
Position	Staff
Head Coach	(Hong Kong) Lee Chi Kin
Assistant Coach	(Hong Kong) Lee Hang Wui
Assistant Coach	(Hong Kong) Wong Tsz Fung
Assistant Coach	(Hong Kong) Lee Hong Lim
Goalkeeper Coach	(Hong Kong) Fan Chun Yip

Last updated: 10 September 2015
Source: Pegasus FC

== Squad statistics ==
=== Overall Stats ===
	League	Senior Shield	FA Cup	Total Stats
Games played	0	0	0	0
Games won	0	0	0	0
Games drawn	0	0	0	0
Games lost	0	0	0	0
Goals for	0	0	0	0
Goals against	0	0	0	0
Players used	0	0	0	0
Yellow cards	0	0	0	0
Red cards	0	0	0	0

Last updated: 25 July 2015
Source: Player Stats

=== Appearances and goals ===
Key

No. = Squad number

Pos. = Playing position

Nat. = Nationality

Apps = Appearances

GK = Goalkeeper

DF = Defender

MF = Midfielder

FW = Forward

Numbers in parentheses denote appearances as substitute. Players with number struck through and marked † left the club during the playing season.

As of 25 July 2015

No.	Pos.	Nat.	Name	Premier League		Senior Shield		FA Cup		League Cup		Others		Total	
No.	Pos.	Nat.	Name	Apps	Goals	Apps	Goals	Apps	Goals	Apps	Goals	Apps	Goals	Apps	Goals
1	GK	MKD	Kristijan Naumovski	0	0	0	0	0	0	0	0	0	0	0	0
3	DF	BRA	Eduardo Praes	0	0	0	0	0	0	0	0	0	0	0	0
5	DF	HKG	Leung Kwun Chung	0	0	0	0	0	0	0	0	0	0	0	0
6	MF	SER	Dušan Martinović	0	0	0	0	0	0	0	0	0	0	0	0
7	MF	HKG	Wong Wai	0	0	0	0	0	0	0	0	0	0	0	0
8	MF	HKG	Lee Ka Yiu	0	0	0	0	0	0	0	0	0	0	0	0
9	MF	HKG	Lo Kong Wai	0	0	0	0	0	0	0	0	0	0	0	0
10	MF	MNE	Admir Adrović	0	0	0	0	0	0	0	0	0	0	0	0
11	FW	CRO	Ivan Miličević	0	0	0	0	0	0	0	0	0	0	0	0
12	DF	HKG	Leung Nok Hang	0	0	0	0	0	0	0	0	0	0	0	0
13	DF	HKG	Wong Chun Ho	0	0	0	0	0	0	0	0	0	0	0	0
14	DF	HKG	Fong Pak Lun	0	0	0	0	0	0	0	0	0	0	0	0
15	DF	HKG	Fung Hing Wa	0	0	0	0	0	0	0	0	0	0	0	0
16	MF	HKG	Tan Chun Lok	0	0	0	0	0	0	0	0	0	0	0	0
17	MF	HKG	Chan Pak Hang	0	0	0	0	0	0	0	0	0	0	0	0
18	DF	HKG	Kwok Kin Pong	0	0	0	0	0	0	0	0	0	0	0	0
19	MF	HKG	Wong Lok	0	0	0	0	0	0	0	0	0	0	0	0
20	MF	HKG	Chan Pak Hei	0	0	0	0	0	0	0	0	0	0	0	0
22	DF	HKG	Wu Chun Ming	0	0	0	0	0	0	0	0	0	0	0	0
23	FW	HKG	Jaimes McKee	0	0	0	0	0	0	0	0	0	0	0	0
26	DF	HKG	Lee Ka Ho	0	0	0	0	0	0	0	0	0	0	0	0
30	GK	HKG	Wong Tsz Chun	0	0	0	0	0	0	0	0	0	0	0	0
31	FW	HKG	Cheng Lai Hin	0	0	0	0	0	0	0	0	0	0	0	0
88	GK	HKG	Yuen Ho Chun	0	0	0	0	0	0	0	0	0	0	0	0
89	MF	BRA	João Emir Porto Pereira	0	0	0	0	0	0	0	0	0	0	0	0

=== Top scorers ===
Last updated: 25 July 2015.
Source: Hong Kong Football Association

The list is sorted by shirt number when total goals are equal.

Rnk	Pos	No.	Player	Premier League	Senior Shield	FA Cup	Total
Own goals							
TOTALS							

=== Disciplinary record ===
Includes all competitive matches.Players listed below made at least one appearance for Southern first squad during the season.

N	P	Nat.	Name	League			Shield			FA Cup			Others			Total			Notes
N	P	Nat.	Name	Yellow card	Second yellow card	Red card	Yellow card	Second yellow card	Red card	Yellow card	Second yellow card	Red card	Yellow card	Second yellow card	Red card	Yellow card	Second yellow card	Red card	Notes

Last updated: 25 July 2015
Source: Competitive matches
Ordered by (red card) , (second yellow card) and (yellow card)
(yellow card) = Number of bookings; (second yellow card) = Number of sending offs after a second yellow card; (red card) = Number of sending offs by a direct red card.

=== Substitution Record ===
Includes all competitive matches.

			League		Shield		FA Cup		Others		Total	
No.	Pos	Name	subson	subsoff	subson	subsoff	subson	subsoff	subson	subsoff	subson	subsoff
Goalkeepers
1	GK	Kristijan Naumovski	0	0	0	0	0	0	0	0	0	0
30	GK	Wong Tsz Chung	0	0	0	0	0	0	0	0	0	0
88	GK	Yuen Ho Chun	0	0	0	0	0	0	0	0	0	0
Defenders
3	CB	Eduardo Praes	0	0	0	0	0	0	0	0	0	0
5	CB	Leung Kwun Chung	0	0	0	0	0	0	0	0	0	0
12	CB	Leung Nok Hang	0	0	0	0	0	0	0	0	0	0
13	RB	Wong Chun Ho	0	0	0	0	0	0	0	0	0	0
14	LB	Fong Pak Lun	0	0	0	0	0	0	0	0	0	0
15	CB	Fung Hing Wa	0	0	0	0	0	0	0	0	0	0
18	LB	Kwok Kin Pong	0	0	0	0	0	0	0	0	0	0
22	RB	Wu Chun Ming	0	0	0	0	0	0	0	0	0	0
Midfielders
6	DM	Dušan Martinović	0	0	0	0	0	0	0	0	0	0
8	RM	Lee Ka Yiu	0	0	0	0	0	0	0	0	0	0
9	LM	Lo Kong Wai	0	0	0	0	0	0	0	0	0	0
16	AM	Tan Chun Lok	0	0	0	0	0	0	0	0	0	0
17	RM	Chan Pak Hang	0	0	0	0	0	0	0	0	0	0
19	RM	Wong Lok	0	0	0	0	0	0	0	0	0	0
20	CM	Chan Pak Hei	0	0	0	0	0	0	0	0	0	0
26	LM	Lee Ka Ho	0	0	0	0	0	0	0	0	0	0
89	AM	João Emir Porto Pereira	0	0	0	0	0	0	0	0	0	0
Forwards
7	CF	Wong Wai	0	0	0	0	0	0	0	0	0	0
10	CF	Admir Adrović	0	0	0	0	0	0	0	0	0	0
11	CF	Ivan Miličević	0	0	0	0	0	0	0	0	0	0
23	CF	Jaimes McKee	0	0	0	0	0	0	0	0	0	0
31	CF	Cheng Lai Hin	0	0	0	0	0	0	0	0	0	0

Last updated: 25 July 2015

=== Captains ===
No.	P	Name	Country	No. games	Notes

Last updated: 25 July 2015
Source: Competitive match reports.
Competitive matches only
Matches started as captain only
Country: FIFA nationality; No.: Squad number; P: Position; Name: Player name; No. Games: Number of games started as captain.

== Competitions ==
=== Overall ===
Competition	Started round	Current position / round	Final position / round	First match	Last match
Hong Kong Premier League	—	4th		12 September 2015	
Senior Shield	—	—			
FA Cup	—	—			

Updated to match played 25 July 2015
Source: Competitions

=== First Division League ===
==== Classification ====
Pos	Team	Pld	W	D	L	GF	GA	GD	Pts	Qualification or relegation
3	South China	16	9	2	5	26	21	+5	29	Qualification to season play-off (Note: Since the winners of the Senior Shield, Eastern, and the winners of the League Cup, Kitchee, qualified for AFC competitions and the Season Play-off respectively based on league position, the spots awarded to the Senior Shield winner and the League Cup winner for the Season Play-off were awarded to the third and fourth placed team in the league. Pegasus qualified as winners of the FA Cup.)
4	Southern	16	6	5	5	26	21	+5	23	Qualification to season play-off
5	Pegasus	16	4	5	7	22	27	−5	17	Qualification to season play-off
6	Dreams Metro Gallery	16	4	4	8	19	30	−11	16	Relegation to First Division (Note: Both Dreams Metro Gallery and Wong Tai Sin did not apply for the next season's Hong Kong Premier League Licence.)
7	Yuen Long	16	3	6	7	21	32	−11	15	

Source: Hong Kong Football Association
Rules for classification: 1) Points; 2) Head-to-head points; 3) Head-to-head goal difference; 4) Head-to-head goals scored; 5) Goal difference; 6) Goals scored; 7) Fair-play points; 8) Drawing lots (Play-off if the winner has to be decided)

==== Results summary ====
Overall								Home						Away					
Pld	W	D	L	GF	GA	GD	Pts	W	D	L	GF	GA	GD	W	D	L	GF	GA	GD
0	0	0	0	0	0	0	0	0	0	0	0	0	0	0	0	0	0	0	0

Last updated: 25 July 2015.
Source: Premier League
