= 2015–16 Hong Kong season play-off =

Tournament details
- Country: Hong Kong
- Teams: 4

Final positions
- Champions: Kitchee
- Runner-up: Southern
- AFC Champions League: Kitchee

Tournament statistics
- Matches played: 3
- Goals scored: 10 (3.33 per match)
- Attendance: 3,851 (1,284 per match)

2015–16 season play-off for the 2015–16 Hong Kong football season is the 4th season of the tournament.

The play-off semi-finals are played in one match each, contested by the teams who finished in 2nd place in the Premier League table, the winners of the Senior Challenge Shield, the champions of the FA Cup and the champions of the League Cup. The winners of the semi-finals go through to the final, with the winner of the final gaining participation for the 2017 AFC Champions League qualifying play-off.

As Eastern won the Senior Shield and Kitchee won the League Cup, as well as coming in 2nd place in the Premier League, teams therefore finishing in 3rd and 4th place in the Hong Kong Premier League entered.

== Qualified ==
=== Premier League ===
Pos	Team	Pld	W	D	L	GF	GA	GD	Pts	Qualification or relegation
1	Eastern	16	12	2	2	35	13	+22	38	Qualification to Champions League group stage
2	Kitchee	16	11	4	1	32	11	+21	37	Qualification to season play-off and Champions League preliminary round 2
3	South China	16	9	2	5	26	21	+5	29	Qualification to season play-off (Note: Since the winners of the Senior Shield, Eastern, and the winners of the League Cup, Kitchee, qualified for AFC competitions and the Season Play-off respectively based on league position, the spots awarded to the Senior Shield winner and the League Cup winner for the Season Play-off were awarded to the third and fourth placed team in the league. Pegasus qualified as winners of the FA Cup.)
4	Southern	16	6	5	5	26	21	+5	23	Qualification to season play-off
5	Pegasus	16	4	5	7	22	27	−5	17	Qualification to season play-off
6	Dreams Metro Gallery	16	4	4	8	19	30	−11	16	Relegation to First Division (Note: Both Dreams Metro Gallery and Wong Tai Sin did not apply for the next season's Hong Kong Premier League Licence.)
7	Yuen Long	16	3	6	7	21	32	−11	15	
8	Rangers	16	2	5	9	15	29	−14	11 (Note: Rangers wins head-to-head against Wong Tai Sin.)	
9	Wong Tai Sin	16	2	5	9	17	29	−12	11	Relegation to First Division

Source: Hong Kong Football Association
Rules for classification: 1) Points; 2) Head-to-head points; 3) Head-to-head goal difference; 4) Head-to-head goals scored; 5) Goal difference; 6) Goals scored; 7) Fair-play points; 8) Drawing lots (Play-off if the winner has to be decided)

=== Senior Challenge Shield ===
The winners of the Senior Challenge Shield will guarantee a place in the play-off.

Winners:

- Eastern

=== FA Cup ===
The winners of the FA Cup will guarantee a place in the play-off.

Winners:

- Pegasus

=== League Cup ===
The winners of the League Cup will guarantee a place in the play-off.

Winners:

- Kitchee

== Calendar ==
Round	Draw Date	Date	Matches	Clubs
Semi-finals	15 May 2016	21–22 May 2016 at Mong Kok Stadium	2	4 → 2
Final	15 May 2016	28 May 2016 at Mong Kok Stadium	1	2 → 1

== Bracket ==
Semi-finals
South China	1
Southern	2
Pegasus	1
Kitchee	4

Final
Southern	0
Kitchee	2

== Fixtures and results ==
=== Semi-finals ===
21 May 2016	South China	1–2	Southern	Mong Kok Stadium, Kowloon
15:00 UTC+8	Griffiths 77' (pen.)	Report	Luk 25'; Wellingsson 62'	Attendance: 1,177; Referee: Lau Fong Hei

22 May 2016	Pegasus	1–4	Kitchee	Mong Kok Stadium, Kowloon
20:00 UTC+8	Emir 61'	Report	Sandro 2', 4'; Annan 42'; Lum 70'	Attendance: 1,179; Referee: Tong Kui Sum

=== Final ===
28 May 2016	Southern	0–2	Kitchee	Mong Kok Stadium, Kowloon
15:00 UTC+8		Report	Akande 32'; Lam Ka Wai 89'	Attendance: 1,495; Referee: Ho Wai Sing
