= 2015–16 Hong Kong Senior Shield =

Tournament details
- Country: Hong Kong
- Teams: 9

Final positions
- Champions: Eastern (10th title)
- Runners-up: Southern

Tournament statistics
- Matches played: 8
- Goals scored: 25 (3.13 per match)
- Attendance: 13,773 (1,722 per match)
- Top goal scorer(s): Andrew Barisic (Eastern); James Ha (Southern) (4 goals)

2015–16 Hong Kong Senior Shield (officially known as 2015–16 HKFA Canbo Senior Shield due to sponsorship reasons) was the 114th season of one of the Asian oldest football knockout competitions, Hong Kong Senior Shield. Only nine teams entered this edition, with one game being played in first round before the quarter-final stage. The competition was only open to teams that play in the 2015–16 Hong Kong Premier League. Eastern won their 10th title on 24 January 2016.

== Calendar ==
| Stage | Round | Date |
|---|---|---|
| Knockout | First round | 23 September 2015 |
| Knockout | Quarter-final | 3 – 4 October 2015 |
| Knockout | Semi-final | 26 – 27 December 2015 |
| Knockout | Final | 24 January 2016 |

== Bracket ==
First round
Dreams Metro Gallery | 1
**Southern (p)** | **2***

Quarter-finals
Wong Tai Sin | 1
**Southern** | **5**
**Kitchee** | **1**
Pegasus | 0
**Eastern** | **2**
Rangers | 0
**South China** | **4**
Yuen Long | 0

Semi-finals
**Southern** | **2**
Kitchee | 1
**Eastern (p)** | **2 (4)**
South China | 2 (3)

Final
Southern | 0
**Eastern** | **2**

Bold = winner
* = after extra time, ( ) = penalty shootout score

== Fixtures and results ==
=== First round ===
| 23 September 2015 | Dreams Metro Gallery | **1–2** (a.e.t.) | **Southern** | Kowloon Bay, Hong Kong |
| 20:00 UTC+8 | Ngue 38' | Report | Wellingsson 58'; Garrido 114' | Stadium: Kowloon Bay Park; Attendance: 277; Referee: Lau Fong Hei |

=== Quarter-finals ===
| 3 October 2015 | **Kitchee** | **1–0** | Pegasus | Mong Kok, Hong Kong |
| 14:30 UTC+8 | Huang Yang 88' | Report | | Stadium: Mong Kok Stadium; Attendance: 1,431; Referee: Ho Wai Sing |

| 3 October 2015 | Wong Tai Sin | **1–5** | **Southern** | Tsing Yi, Hong Kong |
| 17:30 UTC+8 | Nakamura 80' | Report | Tomas 10'; Ha 12', 41'; Garrido 59'; Wellingsson 65' (pen.) | Stadium: Tsing Yi Sports Ground; Attendance: 241; Referee: Tang Hing Fu |

| 4 October 2015 | **South China** | **4–0** | Yuen Long | Mong Kok, Hong Kong |
| 14:30 UTC+8 | Liang Zicheng 9', 77'; Leung Chun Pong 81'; Awal 90' | Report | | Stadium: Mong Kok Stadium; Attendance: 976; Referee: Lau Fong Hei |

| 4 October 2015 | **Eastern** | **2–0** | Rangers | Tsing Yi, Hong Kong |
| 17:30 UTC+8 | Barisic 19' (pen.), 74' | Report | | Stadium: Tsing Yi Sports Ground; Attendance: 810; Referee: Ng Chiu Kok |

=== Semi-finals ===
| 26 December 2015 | **Southern** | **2–1** | Kitchee | Mong Kok, Hong Kong |
| 15:00 UTC+8 | Ha 33', 49' | Report | Belencoso 90+1' | Stadium: Mong Kok Stadium; Attendance: 1,733; Referee: Ng Chiu Kok |

| 27 December 2015 | **Eastern** | **2–2** (a.e.t.) (**4–3** p) | South China | Mong Kok, Hong Kong |
| 15:00 UTC+8 | Diego 80'; Barisic 96' | Report | Carlos 20'; Barisic 93' (o.g.) | Stadium: Mong Kok Stadium; Attendance: 3,748; Referee: Ho Wai Sing |
| | **Penalties** |
| | Barisic (penalty missed); Giovane (penalty scored); Nägelein (penalty scored); Lugo (penalty scored); Roberto (penalty scored) | | (penalty missed) Chan Siu Ki; (penalty scored) Lucas; (penalty missed) Tse; (penalty scored) Mora; (penalty scored) Cheung Kin Fung |

=== Final ===
| 24 January 2016 | Southern | **0–2** | **Eastern** | So Kon Po, Hong Kong |
| 15:00 UTC+8 | | Report | Xu Deshuai 61'; Barisic 85' | Stadium: Hong Kong Stadium; Attendance: 4,557; Referee: Liu Kwok Man |
