= Dušan Martinović =

Serbian footballer

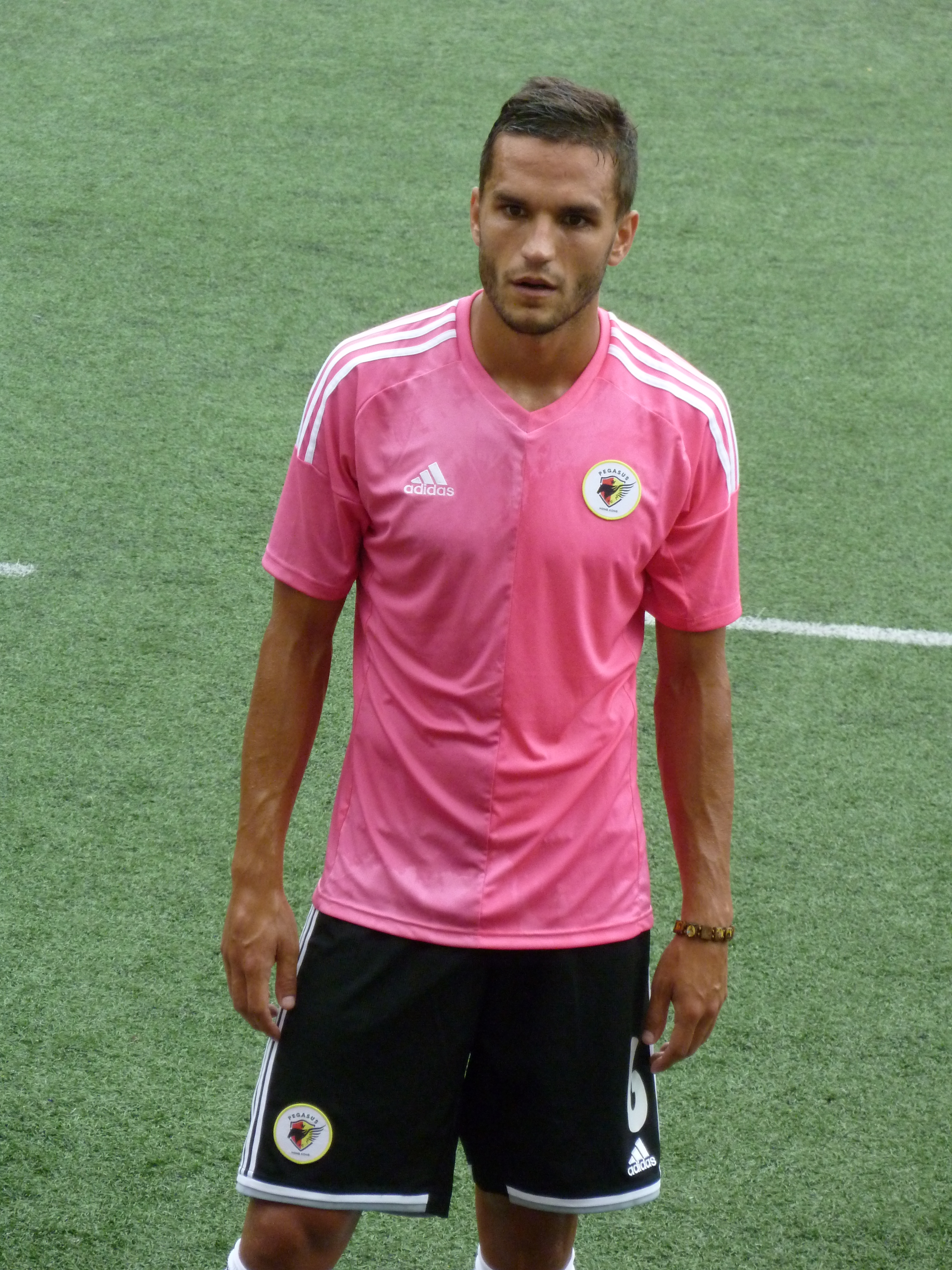

Personal information
- Full name: Dušan Martinović
- Date of birth: 22 December 1987 (age 38)
- Place of birth: Šabac, SFR Yugoslavia
- Height: 1.82 m (5 ft 11 1/2 in)
- Position: Defensive midfielder

Youth career
- Mačva Bogatić
- OFK Beograd

Senior career*
Years	Team	Apps	(Gls)
2005–2006	→ Jedinstvo Paraćin (loan)		
2007–2008	→ Palilulac Beograd (loan)	35	(1)
2008–2009	Kolubara	16	(1)
2009	→ Napredak Kruševac (loan)	14	(1)
2009	Napredak Kruševac	15	(1)
2010–2013	Borac Čačak	60	(3)
2014–2015	Jagodina	33	(4)
2015	Pegasus	0	(0)
2015–2016	Jagodina	17	(2)
2016–2019	Radnik Bijeljina	47	(7)
- * Club domestic league appearances and goals as of 10 April 2019

Dušan Martinović (Serbian Cyrillic: Душан Мартиновић; born 22 December 1987) is a Serbian retired football midfielder who most recently played for FK Radnik Bijeljina.

== Career ==
He has started in local club in his hometown, and later he moved to OFK Beograd, where he passed through youth teams. After his youth career, he played for Jedinstvo Paraćin and Palilulac Beograd in the third level football leagues in Serbia. Then he moved to Kolubara.

=== Kolubara ===
Martinović played for Kolubara in first part of season 2008–09. He made 16 appearances, and scored 1 goal.

=== Napredak Kruševac ===
In 2009, he played for Napredak Kruševac in Jelen SuperLiga, but second part on season 2008–09 he was on loan from Kolubara. For Napredak, he played 29 times and scored two goals.

=== Borac Čačak ===
In second half of season 2009–10 he played for 10 times.

In season 2010–11, he played 5 matches, and then, he injured his ligaments and missed the rest of season.

In season 2011–12, he played just 8 times. Borac was relegated to Serbian First League.

In 2012–13, Martinović was one of the best and most important players for Borac Čačak. After the end of season, he was on trial at Partizan, but not signed.

For first half of season, he made 11 appearances. Then, he left the club.

=== Jagodina ===
In a winter break off-season 2013–14, he signed with Jagodina.

== Career statistics ==
Club	Season	League		Cup		Europe		Other		Total	
Club	Season	Apps	Goals	Apps	Goals	Apps	Goals	Apps	Goals	Apps	Goals
Palilulac Beograd	2006–07	14	0	0	0	0	0	0	0	14	0
Palilulac Beograd	2007–08	21	1	0	0	0	0	0	0	21	1
Palilulac Beograd	Total	35	1	0	0	0	0	0	0	35	1
Kolubara	2008–09	16	1	0	0	0	0	0	0	16	1
Kolubara	Total	16	1	0	0	0	0	0	0	16	1
Napredak	2008–09	14	1	0	0	0	0	0	0	14	1
Napredak	2009–10	15	1	0	0	0	0	0	0	15	1
Napredak	Total	29	2	0	0	0	0	0	0	29	2
Borac Čačak	2009–10	11	0	0	0	0	0	0	0	11	0
Borac Čačak	2010–11	5	0	0	0	0	0	0	0	5	0
Borac Čačak	2011–12	7	0	1	0	0	0	0	0	8	1
Borac Čačak	2012–13	26	3	3	0	0	0	0	0	29	3
Borac Čačak	2013–14	11	0	0	0	0	0	0	0	11	0
Borac Čačak	Total	60	3	4	0	0	0	0	0	64	3
Jagodina	2013–14	9	1	1	0	0	0	0	0	10	1
Jagodina	2014–15	24	3	4	0	2	0	0	0	30	3
Jagodina	2015–16	17	2	2	0	0	0	0	0	19	2
Jagodina	Total	50	6	7	0	2	0	0	0	59	6
Career total		190	13	11	0	2	0	0	0	203	13

Statistics accurate as of 12 May 2016
