= 2017 AFC Champions League =

26th edition of premier club football tournament organized by the AFC

Tournament details
- Dates: Qualifying: 24 January – 8 February 2017; Competition proper: 20 February – 25 November 2017
- Teams: Competition proper: 32; Total: 47 (from 19 associations)

Final positions
- Champions: (Japan) Urawa Red Diamonds (2nd title)
- Runners-up: (Saudi Arabia) Al-Hilal

Tournament statistics
- Matches played: 126
- Goals scored: 394 (3.13 per match)
- Attendance: 1,779,826 (14,126 per match)
- Top scorer(s): Omar Kharbin (10 goals)
- Best player: Yōsuke Kashiwagi
- Fair play award: (Japan) Urawa Red Diamonds

The 2017 AFC Champions League was the 36th edition of Asia's premier club football tournament organized by the Asian Football Confederation (AFC), and the 15th under the current AFC Champions League title.

Urawa Red Diamonds defeated Al-Hilal in the final to win their second AFC Champions League title, and qualified as the AFC representative at the 2017 FIFA Club World Cup in the United Arab Emirates.

Jeonbuk Hyundai Motors were the defending champions, but they were excluded from the 2017 season due to a bribery scandal in the domestic K League Classic. Jeonbuk appealed to the Court of Arbitration for Sport, but their request for provisional measures was rejected on 3 February.

== Association team allocation ==
The AFC Competitions Committee proposed a revamp of the AFC club competitions on 25 January 2014, which was ratified by the AFC Executive Committee on 16 April 2014. The 46 AFC member associations (excluding the associate member Northern Mariana Islands) are ranked based on their national team's and clubs' performance over the last four years in AFC competitions, with the allocation of slots for the 2017 and 2018 editions of the AFC club competitions determined by the 2016 AFC rankings (Entry Manual Article 2.2):

- The associations are split into two regions:
  - West Region consists of the associations from the West Asian Football Federation (WAFF), the Central Asian Football Association (CAFA), and the South Asian Football Federation (SAFF).
  - East Region consists of the associations from the ASEAN Football Federation (AFF) and the East Asian Football Federation (EAFF).
- In each region, there are four groups in the group stage, including a total of 12 direct slots, with the 4 remaining slots filled through play-offs.
- The top 12 associations in each region as per the AFC rankings are eligible to enter the AFC Champions League, as long as they fulfill the AFC Champions League criteria.
- The top six associations in each region get at least one direct slot in the group stage, while the remaining associations get only play-off slots (as well as AFC Cup group stage slots):
  - The associations ranked 1st and 2nd each get three direct slots and one play-off slot.
  - The associations ranked 3rd and 4th each get two direct slots and two play-off slots.
  - The associations ranked 5th each get one direct slot and two play-off slots.
  - The associations ranked 6th each get one direct slot and one play-off slot.
  - The associations ranked 7th to 12th each get one play-off slot.
- The maximum number of slots for each association is one-third of the total number of eligible teams in the top division.
- If any association gives up its direct slots, they are redistributed to the highest eligible association, with each association limited to a maximum of three direct slots.
- If any association gives up its play-off slots, they are annulled and not redistributed to any other association.

For the 2017 AFC Champions League, the associations were allocated slots according to their association ranking published on 30 November 2016, which takes into account their performance in the AFC Champions League and the AFC Cup, as well as their national team's FIFA World Rankings, during the period between 2013 and 2016.

The slot allocation was announced on 7 December 2016, with India and Maldives returning to the West Region. The final slot allocation, after unused slots were redistributed, was announced on 12 December 2016.

Participation for 2017 AFC Champions League
Participating
Not participating

West Region
Rank		Member Association	Points	Slots			
Rank		Member Association	Points	Group stage	Play-off		
Region	AFC	Member Association	Points	Group stage	Play-off round	Prelim. round 2	Prelim. round 1
1	2	(United Arab Emirates) United Arab Emirates	87.555	3	1	0	0
2	3	(Saudi Arabia) Saudi Arabia	84.698	3	1	0	0
3	4	Iran	78.908	3	1	0	0
4	5	Qatar	78.171	2	2	0	0
5	9	Uzbekistan	56.876	1	1	1	0
6	10	Iraq	37.240	0	0	0	0
7	11	Kuwait	36.457	0	0	0	0
8	13	Syria	34.257	0	0	0	0
9	15	Jordan	31.213	0	0	1	0
10	18	India	27.930	0	0	1	0
11	19	Bahrain	27.353	0	0	1	0
12	20	Lebanon	22.077	0	0	0	0
Total				12	6	4	0
Total				12	10		
Total				22			

East Region
Rank		Member Association	Points	Slots			
Rank		Member Association	Points	Group stage	Play-off		
Region	AFC	Member Association	Points	Group stage	Play-off round	Prelim. round 2	Prelim. round 1
1	1	(South Korea) South Korea	96.311	3	1	0	0
2	6	Japan	75.807	3	1	0	0
3	7	China	72.719	2	2	0	0
4	8	Australia	72.599	2	0	1	0
5	12	Thailand	34.753	1	0	2	0
6	14	(Hong Kong) Hong Kong	31.797	1	0	1	0
7	16	Vietnam	29.273	0	0	1	0
8	17	Malaysia	28.865	0	0	1	0
9	21	Indonesia	20.372	0	0	0	0
10	24	Myanmar	17.220	0	0	1	0
11	25	Philippines	17.188	0	0	0	1
12	27	Singapore	13.664	0	0	0	1
Total				12	4	7	2
Total				12	13		
Total				25			

Notes

1. Iraq (IRQ): Iraq did not fulfill the AFC Champions League criteria.
2. Kuwait (KUW): Kuwait could not enter due to FIFA's suspension of the Kuwait Football Association at the entry deadline.
3. Syria (SYR): Syria did not fulfill the AFC Champions League criteria.
4. Lebanon (LIB): Lebanon did not fulfill the AFC Champions League criteria.
5. Australia (AUS): The top division run by the Football Federation Australia, the A-League, only had nine Australia-based teams in the 2015–16 season, so Australia could only get a maximum of three total slots (Entry Manual 5.4).
6. Indonesia (IDN): Indonesia did not submit any entry.

== Teams ==
The following 47 teams from 19 associations entered the competition.

In the following table, the number of appearances and last appearance count only those since the 2002–03 season (including qualifying rounds), when the competition was rebranded as the AFC Champions League.

West Region
Team	Qualifying method	App	Last App
Group stage direct entrants (Groups A–D)
(United Arab Emirates) Al-Ahli	2015–16 UAE Pro-League champions	7th	2015
(United Arab Emirates) Al-Jazira	2015–16 UAE President's Cup winners	9th	2016
(United Arab Emirates) Al-Ain	2015–16 UAE Pro-League runners-up	12th	2016
(Saudi Arabia) Al-Ahli	2015–16 Saudi Professional League champions and 2016 King Cup winners	9th	2016
(Saudi Arabia) Al-Hilal	2015–16 Saudi Professional League runners-up	13th	2016
(Saudi Arabia) Al-Taawoun	2015–16 Saudi Professional League 4th place	1st	none
(Iran) Esteghlal Khuzestan	2015–16 Persian Gulf Pro League champions	1st	none
(Iran) Zob Ahan	2015–16 Hazfi Cup winners and 2016 Iranian Super Cup winners	6th	2016
(Iran) Persepolis	2015–16 Persian Gulf Pro League runners-up	6th	2015
(Qatar) Al-Rayyan	2015–16 Qatar Stars League champions	7th	2014
(Qatar) Lekhwiya	2016 Emir of Qatar Cup winners	6th	2016
(Uzbekistan) Lokomotiv Tashkent	2016 Uzbek League champions and 2016 Uzbekistan Cup winners	5th	2016
Qualifying play-off participants
Entering in play-off round
(United Arab Emirates) Al-Wahda	2015–16 UAE Pro-League 3rd place	8th	2015
(Saudi Arabia) Al-Fateh	2015–16 Saudi Professional League 5th place	2nd	2014
(Iran) Esteghlal	2015–16 Persian Gulf Pro League 3rd place	8th	2014
(Qatar) El Jaish	2015–16 Qatar Stars League runners-up	5th	2016
(Qatar) Al-Sadd	2015–16 Qatar Stars League 3rd place	12th	2016
(Uzbekistan) Bunyodkor	2016 Uzbek League runners-up	10th	2016
Entering in preliminary round 2
(Uzbekistan) Nasaf Qarshi	2016 Uzbek League 3rd place	5th	2016
(Jordan) Al-Wehdat	2015–16 Jordan League champions	4th	2016
(India) Bengaluru FC	2015–16 I-League champions	2nd	2015
(Bahrain) Al-Hidd	2015–16 Bahrain First Division League champions	2nd	2014

East Region
Team	Qualifying method	App	Last App
Group stage direct entrants (Groups E–H)
(South Korea) FC Seoul	2016 K League Classic champions	7th	2016
(South Korea) Suwon Samsung Bluewings	2016 Korean FA Cup winners	8th	2016
(South Korea) Jeju United	2016 K League Classic 3rd place	2nd	2011
(Japan) Kashima Antlers	2016 J1 League champions and 2016 Emperor's Cup winners	7th	2015
(Japan) Urawa Red Diamonds	2016 J1 League runners-up	6th	2016
(Japan) Kawasaki Frontale	2016 J1 League 3rd place	5th	2014
(China) Guangzhou Evergrande	2016 Chinese Super League champions and 2016 Chinese FA Cup winners	6th	2016
(China) Jiangsu Suning	2016 Chinese Super League runners-up	3rd	2016
(Australia) Adelaide United	2015–16 A-League premiers and 2016 A-League Grand Final winners	6th	2016
(Australia) Western Sydney Wanderers	2015–16 A-League regular season runners-up	3rd	2015
(Thailand) Muangthong United	2016 Thai League champions	6th	2016
(Hong Kong) Eastern	2015–16 Hong Kong Premier League champions	1st	none
Qualifying play-off participants
Entering in play-off round
(South Korea) Ulsan Hyundai	2016 K League Classic 4th place	5th	2014
(Japan) Gamba Osaka	2016 J1 League 4th place	9th	2016
(China) Shanghai SIPG	2016 Chinese Super League 3rd place	2nd	2016
(China) Shanghai Shenhua	2016 Chinese Super League 4th place	7th	2011
Entering in preliminary round 2
(Australia) Brisbane Roar	2015–16 A-League regular season 3rd place	4th	2015
(Thailand) Sukhothai	2016 Thai FA Cup co-winners	1st	none
(Thailand) Bangkok United	2016 Thai League runners-up	2nd	2007
(Hong Kong) Kitchee	2015–16 Hong Kong season play-off winners	3rd	2016
(Vietnam) Hà Nội	2016 V.League 1 champions	4th	2016
(Malaysia) Johor Darul Ta'zim	2016 Liga Super champions	3rd	2016
(Myanmar) Yadanarbon	2016 Myanmar National League champions	2nd	2015
Entering in preliminary round 1
(Philippines) Global	2016 UFL Division 1 champions	1st	none
(Singapore) Tampines Rovers	2016 S.League runners-up	3rd	2016

Notes

1. Hong Kong (HKG): Eastern, the 2015–16 Hong Kong Premier League champions, initially gave up their place in the AFC Champions League due to financial problems. As a result, the Hong Kong Football Association decided that Kitchee, the 2015–16 Hong Kong season play-off winners, would enter the group stage instead of the qualifying play-offs, while Southern District, the play-off runners-up, would enter the qualifying play-offs. However, the AFC did not allow Kitchee to replace Eastern in the AFC Champions League group stage, and Kitchee would still enter the qualifying play-offs, while Southern District would not be able to participate in the AFC Champions League. On 21 November 2016, the Hong Kong Football Association announced they had reversed their decision and would put forward Eastern and Kitchee as their representatives.
2. South Korea (KOR): On 18 January 2017, Jeonbuk Hyundai Motors, the 2016 K League Classic runners-up, were excluded from the 2017 AFC Champions League due to a bribery scandal in the domestic K League Classic. As a result, Jeju United, the league 3rd place, entered the group stage instead of the qualifying play-offs to replace them, while Ulsan Hyundai, the league 4th place, entered the qualifying play-offs to replace Jeju United.
3. Saudi Arabia (KSA): Al-Ittihad, the 2015–16 Saudi Professional League 3rd place, could not participate in the AFC Champions League due to club licensing requirements problems. As a result, Al-Taawoun, the league 4th place, entered the group stage instead of the qualifying play-offs, while Al-Fateh, the league 5th place, entered the qualifying play-offs.
4. Singapore (SIN): Albirex Niigata Singapore, the 2016 S.League champions, is a satellite team of Japanese club Albirex Niigata and thus ineligible to represent Singapore in AFC club competitions. As a result, Tampines Rovers, the league runners-up, entered the qualifying play-offs.
5. Thailand (THA): Due to the death of King Bhumibol Adulyadej, the Football Association of Thailand cancelled the remainder of the 2016 Thai football season on 14 October 2016. The standings of the 2016 Thai Premier League at the point of cancellation were declared as final, meaning Muangthong United and Bangkok United finished as the league champions and runners-up respectively. The four semi-finalists of the 2016 Thai FA Cup were declared as co-winners, and a draw was held to decide which team would represent Thailand in the AFC Champions League, and was won by Sukhothai.
Location of teams of the 2017 AFC Champions League.
West Region
East Region
(p) Qualifying play-off participants
Location of the 2025–26 AFC Champions League Elite league stage teams
Blue: West Region

== Schedule ==
The schedule of the competition was as follows. Starting from 2017, matches in the West Region were played on Mondays and Tuesdays instead of Tuesdays and Wednesdays.

Stage	Round	Draw date	First leg	Second leg
Preliminary stage	Preliminary round 1	No draw	24 January 2017	
Preliminary stage	Preliminary round 2	No draw	25 & 31 January 2017	
Play-off stage	Play-off round	No draw	7–8 February 2017	
Group stage	Matchday 1	13 December 2016 (Petaling Jaya, Malaysia)	20–22 February 2017	
Group stage	Matchday 2	13 December 2016 (Petaling Jaya, Malaysia)	27 February – 1 March 2017	
Group stage	Matchday 3	13 December 2016 (Petaling Jaya, Malaysia)	13–15 March 2017	
Group stage	Matchday 4	13 December 2016 (Petaling Jaya, Malaysia)	10–12 April 2017	
Group stage	Matchday 5	13 December 2016 (Petaling Jaya, Malaysia)	24–26 April 2017	
Group stage	Matchday 6	13 December 2016 (Petaling Jaya, Malaysia)	8–10 May 2017	
Knockout stage	Round of 16	13 December 2016 (Petaling Jaya, Malaysia)	22–24 May 2017	29–31 May 2017
Knockout stage	Quarter-finals	6 June 2017 (Kuala Lumpur, Malaysia)	21–23 August 2017	11–13 September 2017
Knockout stage	Semi-finals	6 June 2017 (Kuala Lumpur, Malaysia)	26–27 September 2017	17–18 October 2017
Knockout stage	Final	6 June 2017 (Kuala Lumpur, Malaysia)	18 November 2017	25 November 2017

== Qualifying play-offs ==
In the qualifying play-offs, each tie was played as a single match. Extra time and penalty shoot-out were used to decide the winner if necessary (Regulations Article 9.2). The eight winners of the play-off round advanced to the group stage to join the 24 direct entrants. All losers in each round from associations with only play-off slots entered the AFC Cup group stage. The bracket of the qualifying play-offs for each region was determined by the AFC based on the association ranking of each team, with the team from the higher-ranked association hosting the match. Teams from the same association could not be placed into the same play-off.

=== Preliminary round 1 ===
East Region
Team 1	Score	Team 2
Global (Philippines)	2–0	(Singapore) Tampines Rovers

=== Preliminary round 2 ===
West Region
Team 1	Score	Team 2
Al-Wehdat (Jordan)	2–1	(India) Bengaluru FC
Nasaf Qarshi (Uzbekistan)	4–0	(Bahrain) Al-Hidd

East Region
Team 1	Score	Team 2
Kitchee (Hong Kong)	3–2 (a.e.t.)	(Vietnam) Hà Nội
Bangkok United (Thailand)	1–1 (a.e.t.) (4–5 p)	(Malaysia) Johor Darul Ta'zim
Sukhothai (Thailand)	5–0	(Myanmar) Yadanarbon
Brisbane Roar (Australia)	6–0	(Philippines) Global

=== Play-off round ===
West Region
Team 1	Score	Team 2
Al-Wahda (United Arab Emirates)	3–0	(Jordan) Al-Wehdat
Al-Fateh (Saudi Arabia)	1–0	(Uzbekistan) Nasaf Qarshi
Esteghlal (Iran)	0–0 (a.e.t.) (4–3 p)	(Qatar) Al-Sadd
El Jaish (Qatar)	0–0 (a.e.t.) (1–3 p)	(Uzbekistan) Bunyodkor

East Region
Team 1	Score	Team 2
Ulsan Hyundai (South Korea)	1–1 (a.e.t.) (4–3 p)	(Hong Kong) Kitchee
Gamba Osaka (Japan)	3–0	(Malaysia) Johor Darul Ta'zim
Shanghai SIPG (China)	3–0	(Thailand) Sukhothai
Shanghai Shenhua (China)	0–2	(Australia) Brisbane Roar

== Group stage ==
The draw for the group stage was held on 13 December 2016, 16:00 MYT (UTC+8), at the Hilton Petaling Jaya in Petaling Jaya, Malaysia. The 32 teams were drawn into eight groups of four: four groups each in the West Region (Groups A–D) and the East Region (Groups E–H). Teams from the same association could not be drawn into the same group. In the group stage, each group was played on a home-and-away round-robin basis. The winners and runners-up of each group advanced to the round of 16 of the knockout stage.

Tiebreakers
The teams were ranked according to points (3 points for a win, 1 point for a draw, 0 points for a loss). If tied on points, tiebreakers were applied in the following order (Regulations Article 10.5):
1. Points in head-to-head matches among tied teams;
2. Goal difference in head-to-head matches among tied teams;
3. Goals scored in head-to-head matches among tied teams;
4. Away goals scored in head-to-head matches among tied teams;
5. If more than two teams are tied, and after applying all head-to-head criteria above, a subset of teams are still tied, all head-to-head criteria above are reapplied exclusively to this subset of teams;
6. Goal difference in all group matches;
7. Goals scored in all group matches;
8. Penalty shoot-out if only two teams are tied and they met in the last round of the group;
9. Disciplinary points (yellow card = 1 point, red card as a result of two yellow cards = 3 points, direct red card = 3 points, yellow card followed by direct red card = 4 points);
10. Team from the higher-ranked association.

=== Group A ===
Pos	Team	Pld	W	D	L	GF	GA	GD	Pts	Qualification	AHL	EST	TAA	LOK
1	(United Arab Emirates) Al-Ahli	6	3	2	1	10	5	+5	11 (Note: Head-to-head results: Al-Ahli 2–1 Esteghlal, Esteghlal 1–1 Al-Ahli.)	Advance to knockout stage	—	2–1	0–0	4–0
2	(Iran) Esteghlal	6	3	2	1	10	5	+5	11	Advance to knockout stage	1–1	—	3–0	2–0
3	(Saudi Arabia) Al-Taawoun	6	1	2	3	7	12	−5	5 (Note: Head-to-head results: Al-Taawoun 1–0 Lokomotiv Tashkent, Lokomotiv Tashkent 4–4 Al-Taawoun.)		1–3	1–2	—	1–0
4	(Uzbekistan) Lokomotiv Tashkent	6	1	2	3	7	12	−5	5		2–0	1–1	4–4	—

Source: AFC

=== Group B ===
Pos	Team	Pld	W	D	L	GF	GA	GD	Pts	Qualification	LEK	ESK	FAT	JAZ
1	(Qatar) Lekhwiya	6	4	2	0	15	6	+9	14	Advance to knockout stage	—	2–1	4–1	3–0
2	(Iran) Esteghlal Khuzestan	6	2	3	1	6	5	+1	9	Advance to knockout stage	1–1	—	1–0	1–1
3	(Saudi Arabia) Al-Fateh	6	1	3	2	7	9	−2	6		2–2	1–1	—	3–1
4	(United Arab Emirates) Al-Jazira	6	0	2	4	3	11	−8	2		1–3	0–1	0–0	—

Source: AFC

=== Group C ===
Pos	Team	Pld	W	D	L	GF	GA	GD	Pts	Qualification	AIN	AHL	ZOB	BUN
1	(United Arab Emirates) Al-Ain	6	3	3	0	14	7	+7	12	Advance to knockout stage	—	2–2	1–1	3–0
2	(Saudi Arabia) Al-Ahli	6	3	2	1	10	7	+3	11	Advance to knockout stage	2–2	—	2–0	2–0
3	(Iran) Zob Ahan	6	2	1	3	6	9	−3	7		0–3	1–2	—	2–1
4	(Uzbekistan) Bunyodkor	6	1	0	5	5	12	−7	3		2–3	2–0	0–2	—

Source: AFC

=== Group D ===
Pos	Team	Pld	W	D	L	GF	GA	GD	Pts	Qualification	HIL	PER	RAY	WAH
1	(Saudi Arabia) Al-Hilal	6	3	3	0	10	7	+3	12	Advance to knockout stage	—	0–0	2–1	1–0
2	(Iran) Persepolis	6	2	3	1	9	8	+1	9	Advance to knockout stage	1–1	—	0–0	4–2
3	(Qatar) Al-Rayyan	6	2	1	3	10	13	−3	7		3–4	3–1	—	2–1
4	(United Arab Emirates) Al-Wahda	6	1	1	4	12	13	−1	4		2–2	2–3	5–1	—

Source: AFC

=== Group E ===
Pos	Team	Pld	W	D	L	GF	GA	GD	Pts	Qualification	KSA	MUA	ULS	BRI
1	(Japan) Kashima Antlers	6	4	0	2	13	5	+8	12	Advance to knockout stage	—	2–1	2–0	3–0
2	(Thailand) Muangthong United	6	3	2	1	7	3	+4	11	Advance to knockout stage	2–1	—	1–0	3–0
3	(South Korea) Ulsan Hyundai	6	2	1	3	9	9	0	7		0–4	0–0	—	6–0
4	(Australia) Brisbane Roar	6	1	1	4	4	16	−12	4		2–1	0–0	2–3	—

Source: AFC

=== Group F ===
Pos	Team	Pld	W	D	L	GF	GA	GD	Pts	Qualification	URA	SSI	SEO	WSW
1	(Japan) Urawa Red Diamonds	6	4	0	2	18	7	+11	12 (Note: Head-to-head results: Shanghai SIPG 3–2 Urawa Red Diamonds, Urawa Red Diamonds 1–0 Shanghai SIPG (Urawa Red Diamonds won on away goals).)	Advance to knockout stage	—	1–0	5–2	6–1
2	(China) Shanghai SIPG	6	4	0	2	15	9	+6	12	Advance to knockout stage	3–2	—	4–2	5–1
3	(South Korea) FC Seoul	6	2	0	4	10	15	−5	6 (Note: Head-to-head results: FC Seoul 2–3 Western Sydney Wanderers, Western Sydney Wanderers 2–3 FC Seoul (tied on head-to-head results, ranked on total goal difference).)		1–0	0–1	—	2–3
4	(Australia) Western Sydney Wanderers	6	2	0	4	10	22	−12	6		0–4	3–2	2–3	—

Source: AFC

=== Group G ===
Pos	Team	Pld	W	D	L	GF	GA	GD	Pts	Qualification	KAW	GZE	SSB	EAS
1	(Japan) Kawasaki Frontale	6	2	4	0	8	3	+5	10 (Note: Head-to-head results: Guangzhou Evergrande 1–1 Kawasaki Frontale, Kawasaki Frontale 0–0 Guangzhou Evergrande (Kawasaki Frontale won on away goals).)	Advance to knockout stage	—	0–0	1–1	4–0
2	(China) Guangzhou Evergrande	6	2	4	0	18	5	+13	10	Advance to knockout stage	1–1	—	2–2	7–0
3	(South Korea) Suwon Samsung Bluewings	6	2	3	1	11	6	+5	9		0–1	2–2	—	5–0
4	(Hong Kong) Eastern	6	0	1	5	1	24	−23	1		1–1	0–6	0–1	—

Source: AFC

=== Group H ===
Pos	Team	Pld	W	D	L	GF	GA	GD	Pts	Qualification	JIA	JEJ	ADE	GAM
1	(China) Jiangsu Suning	6	5	0	1	9	3	+6	15	Advance to knockout stage	—	1–2	2–1	3–0
2	(South Korea) Jeju United	6	3	1	2	12	9	+3	10	Advance to knockout stage	0–1	—	1–3	2–0
3	(Australia) Adelaide United	6	1	2	3	10	13	−3	5		0–1	3–3	—	0–3
4	(Japan) Gamba Osaka	6	1	1	4	7	13	−6	4		0–1	1–4	3–3	—

Source: AFC

== Knockout stage ==
In the knockout stage, the 16 teams played a single-elimination tournament, with the teams split into the two regions until the final. Each tie was played on a home-and-away two-legged basis. The away goals rule, extra time (away goals would not apply in extra time) and penalty shoot-out were used to decide the winner if necessary (Regulations Article 11.3).

=== Bracket ===
The bracket was decided after the draw for the knockout stage, which was held on 6 June 2017, 16:00 MYT (UTC+8), at the JW Marriott Hotel Kuala Lumpur in Kuala Lumpur, Malaysia.

Round of 16	Quarter-finals
(Iran) Esteghlal	1	1	2
(United Arab Emirates) Al-Ain	0	6	6
(United Arab Emirates) Al-Ain	0	0	0
(Saudi Arabia) Al-Hilal	0	3	3
(Iran) Esteghlal Khuzestan	1	1	2
(Saudi Arabia) Al-Hilal	2	2	4
West Region
(Iran) Persepolis	0	1	1
(Qatar) Lekhwiya	0	0	0
(Iran) Persepolis	2	3	5
(Saudi Arabia) Al-Ahli	2	1	3
(Saudi Arabia) Al-Ahli	1	3	4
(United Arab Emirates) Al-Ahli	1	1	2
(China) Shanghai SIPG	2	3	5
(China) Jiangsu Suning	1	2	3
(China) Shanghai SIPG (p)	4	1	5 (5)
(China) Guangzhou Evergrande	0	5	5 (4)
(China) Guangzhou Evergrande (a)	1	1	2
(Japan) Kashima Antlers	0	2	2
East Region
(Thailand) Muangthong United	1	1	2
(Japan) Kawasaki Frontale	3	4	7
(Japan) Kawasaki Frontale	3	1	4
(Japan) Urawa Red Diamonds	1	4	5
(South Korea) Jeju United	2	0	2
(Japan) Urawa Red Diamonds (a.e.t.)	0	3	3

Semi-finals
(Saudi Arabia) Al-Hilal	4	2	6
(Iran) Persepolis	0	2	2
(China) Shanghai SIPG	1	0	1
(Japan) Urawa Red Diamonds	1	1	2

Final
(Saudi Arabia) Al-Hilal	1	0	1
(Japan) Urawa Red Diamonds	1	1	2

=== Round of 16 ===
In the round of 16, the winners of one group played the runners-up of another group from the same region, with the matchups determined by the group stage draw, and the group winners hosting the second leg.

West Region
Team 1	Agg.	Team 2	1st leg	2nd leg
Esteghlal (Iran)	2–6	(United Arab Emirates) Al-Ain	1–0	1–6
Al-Ahli (Saudi Arabia)	4–2	(United Arab Emirates) Al-Ahli	1–1	3–1
Esteghlal Khuzestan (Iran)	2–4	(Saudi Arabia) Al-Hilal	1–2	1–2
Persepolis (Iran)	1–0	(Qatar) Lekhwiya	0–0	1–0

East Region
Team 1	Agg.	Team 2	1st leg	2nd leg
Muangthong United (Thailand)	2–7	(Japan) Kawasaki Frontale	1–3	1–4
Guangzhou Evergrande (China)	2–2 (a)	(Japan) Kashima Antlers	1–0	1–2
Shanghai SIPG (China)	5–3	(China) Jiangsu Suning	2–1	3–2
Jeju United (South Korea)	2–3	(Japan) Urawa Red Diamonds	2–0	0–3 (a.e.t.)

=== Quarter-finals ===
The draw for the quarter-finals was held on 6 June 2017. In the quarter-finals, the four teams from the West Region played in two ties, and the four teams from the East Region played in two ties, with the matchups and order of legs decided by draw, without any seeding or country protection.

West Region
Team 1	Agg.	Team 2	1st leg	2nd leg
Al-Ain (United Arab Emirates)	0–3	(Saudi Arabia) Al-Hilal	0–0	0–3
Persepolis (Iran)	5–3	(Saudi Arabia) Al-Ahli	2–2	3–1

East Region
Team 1	Agg.	Team 2	1st leg	2nd leg
Shanghai SIPG (China)	5–5 (5–4 p)	(China) Guangzhou Evergrande	4–0	1–5 (a.e.t.)
Kawasaki Frontale (Japan)	4–5	(Japan) Urawa Red Diamonds	3–1	1–4

=== Semi-finals ===
In the semi-finals, the two quarter-final winners from the West Region played each other, and the two quarter-final winners from the East Region played each other, with the order of legs determined by the quarter-final draw.

West Region
Team 1	Agg.	Team 2	1st leg	2nd leg
Al-Hilal (Saudi Arabia)	6–2	(Iran) Persepolis	4–0	2–2

East Region
Team 1	Agg.	Team 2	1st leg	2nd leg
Shanghai SIPG (China)	1–2	(Japan) Urawa Red Diamonds	1–1	0–1

=== Final ===
In the final, the two semi-final winners played each other, with the order of legs (first leg hosted by team from the West Region, second leg hosted by team from the East Region) reversed from the previous season's final.

18 November 2017
19:15 UTC+3

Al-Hilal (Saudi Arabia)	1–1	(Japan) Urawa Red Diamonds
Kharbin 37'	Report	Rafael Silva 7'

King Fahd International Stadium, Riyadh
Attendance: 59,136
Referee: Adham Makhadmeh (Jordan)
25 November 2017
19:15 UTC+9

Urawa Red Diamonds (Japan)	1–0	(Saudi Arabia) Al-Hilal
Rafael Silva 88'	Report

Saitama Stadium 2002, Saitama
Attendance: 57,727
Referee: Ravshan Irmatov (Uzbekistan)

Urawa Red Diamonds won 2–1 on aggregate.

== Awards ==
=== Main awards ===
Award	Player	Team
Most Valuable Player	(Japan) Yōsuke Kashiwagi	(Japan) Urawa Red Diamonds
Top Goalscorer	(Syria) Omar Kharbin	(Saudi Arabia) Al-Hilal
Fair Play Award	—	(Japan) Urawa Red Diamonds

=== All-Star Squad ===
Position	Player	Team
Goalkeeper	(Saudi Arabia) Abdullah Al-Mayouf	(Saudi Arabia) Al-Hilal
Goalkeeper	(Japan) Shusaku Nishikawa	(Japan) Urawa Red Diamonds
Defenders	(Saudi Arabia) Motaz Hawsawi	(Saudi Arabia) Al-Ahli
Defenders	(Japan) Yuki Abe	(Japan) Urawa Red Diamonds
Defenders	(Saudi Arabia) Osama Hawsawi	(Saudi Arabia) Al-Hilal
Defenders	(Saudi Arabia) Yasser Al-Shahrani	(Saudi Arabia) Al-Hilal
Defenders	(Saudi Arabia) Mohammed Al-Breik	(Saudi Arabia) Al-Hilal
Midfielders	(United Arab Emirates) Omar Abdulrahman	(United Arab Emirates) Al-Ain
Midfielders	(Japan) Kengo Nakamura	(Japan) Kawasaki Frontale
Midfielders	(Brazil) Oscar	(China) Shanghai SIPG
Midfielders	(Japan) Yōsuke Kashiwagi	(Japan) Urawa Red Diamonds
Midfielders	(Saudi Arabia) Salman Al-Faraj	(Saudi Arabia) Al-Hilal
Midfielders	(Brazil) Ricardo Goulart	(China) Guangzhou Evergrande
Midfielders	(China) Zheng Zhi	(China) Guangzhou Evergrande
Midfielders	(Japan) Kazuki Nagasawa	(Japan) Urawa Red Diamonds
Forwards	(Brazil) Rafael Silva	(Japan) Urawa Red Diamonds
Forwards	(Brazil) Hulk	(China) Shanghai SIPG
Forwards	(Syria) Omar Kharbin	(Saudi Arabia) Al-Hilal
Forwards	(Japan) Yu Kobayashi	(Japan) Kawasaki Frontale
Forwards	(Brazil) Carlos Eduardo	(Saudi Arabia) Al-Hilal
Forwards	(Brazil) Alan	(China) Guangzhou Evergrande
Forwards	(China) Wu Lei	(China) Shanghai SIPG
Forwards	(Nigeria) Godwin Mensha	(Iran) Persepolis

=== Opta Best XI ===
Position	Player	Team
Goalkeeper	(Saudi Arabia) Abdullah Al-Mayouf	(Saudi Arabia) Al-Hilal
Defenders	(Saudi Arabia) Mohammed Al-Breik	(Saudi Arabia) Al-Hilal
Defenders	(Japan) Tomoaki Makino	(Japan) Urawa Red Diamonds
Defenders	(China) Shi Ke	(China) Shanghai SIPG
Defenders	(Saudi Arabia) Yasser Al-Shahrani	(Saudi Arabia) Al-Hilal
Midfielders	(Brazil) Ricardo Goulart	(China) Guangzhou Evergrande
Midfielders	(Brazil) Carlos Eduardo	(Saudi Arabia) Al-Hilal
Midfielders	(Brazil) Paulinho	(China) Guangzhou Evergrande
Forwards	(Syria) Omar Kharbin	(Saudi Arabia) Al-Hilal
Forwards	(Brazil) Rafael Silva	(Japan) Urawa Red Diamonds
Forwards	(Brazil) Hulk	(China) Shanghai SIPG

== Top scorers ==
Team eliminated / inactive for this round.

Rank	Player	Team	MD1	MD2	MD3	MD4	MD5	MD6	2R1	2R2	QF1	QF2	SF1	SF2	F1	F2	Total
1	(Ba'athist Syria) Omar Kharbin	(Saudi Arabia) Al-Hilal			1			2		1			3	2	1		10
2	(Brazil) Hulk	(China) Shanghai SIPG	1	1	1		1		1	1	1	1	1				9
2	(Brazil) Rafael Silva	(Japan) Urawa Red Diamonds	1		1	1	2					1		1	1	1	9
4	(United Arab Emirates) Omar Abdulrahman	(United Arab Emirates) Al-Ain		2		1	1	1		2							7
4	(Brazil) Alan	(China) Guangzhou Evergrande	1	1	1		2					2					7
4	(Brazil) Carlos Eduardo	(Saudi Arabia) Al-Hilal	1	1		1			1			3					7
4	(Brazil) Ricardo Goulart	(China) Guangzhou Evergrande	1	1				2				3					7
4	(Iran) Mehdi Taremi	(Iran) Persepolis		2	1			3				1					7
9	(Japan) Yu Kobayashi	(Japan) Kawasaki Frontale	1		1				1	1	2						6
9	(Iran) Kaveh Rezaei	(Iran) Esteghlal		1		1	1	1	1	1							6

Note: Goals scored in the qualifying play-offs are not counted when determining top scorer (Regulations Article 64.4).

Source: AFC

== Player of the week awards ==
Matchday	Toyota Player of the Week	
Matchday	Player	Team
Group stage
Matchday 1	(Morocco) Youssef El-Arabi	(Qatar) Lekhwiya
Matchday 2	(South Korea) Kim In-sung	(South Korea) Ulsan Hyundai
Matchday 3	(South Korea) Yun Il-lok	(South Korea) FC Seoul
Matchday 4	(South Korea) Ko Seung-beom	(South Korea) Suwon Samsung Bluewings
Matchday 5	(United Arab Emirates) Khalid Eisa	(United Arab Emirates) Al-Ain
Matchday 6	(Uruguay) Nicolás Milesi	(Saudi Arabia) Al-Hilal
Knockout stage
Round of 16 1st leg	(Thailand) Teerasil Dangda	(Thailand) Muangthong United
Round of 16 2nd leg	(United Arab Emirates) Omar Abdulrahman	(United Arab Emirates) Al-Ain
Quarter-finals 1st leg	(Japan) Yu Kobayashi	(Japan) Kawasaki Frontale
Quarter-finals 2nd leg	(Brazil) Carlos Eduardo	(Saudi Arabia) Al-Hilal
Semi-finals 1st leg	(Syria) Omar Kharbin	(Saudi Arabia) Al-Hilal
Semi-finals 2nd leg	(Nigeria) Godwin Mensha	(Iran) Persepolis
Final	(Saudi Arabia) Mohammed Al-Breik	(Saudi Arabia) Al-Hilal

== See also ==
- 2017 AFC Cup
- 2017 FIFA Club World Cup
