= Sham Kwok Keung =

Hong Kong footballer (born 1985)

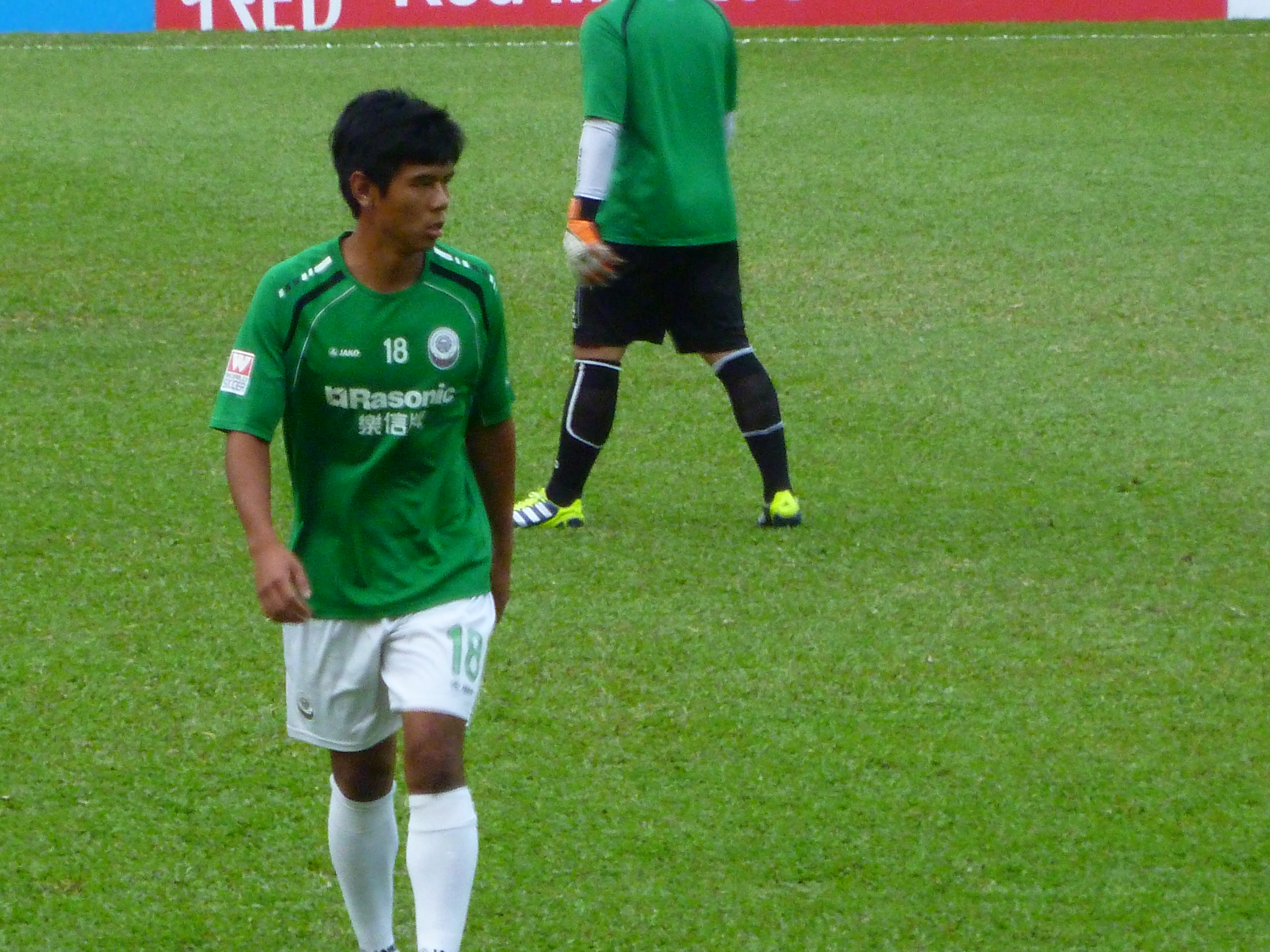

Personal information
- Full name: Tailor Sham Kwok Keung
- Date of birth: 10 September 1985 (age 41)
- Place of birth: Hong Kong
- Height: 1.73 m (5 ft 8 in)
- Position: Left winger

Youth career
- 2000–2002: Happy Valley

Senior career*
Years	Team	Apps	(Gls)
2002–2009	Happy Valley	73	(15)
2009–2010	Shatin	17	(4)
2010–2014	Citizen	62	(16)
2014–2015	Pegasus	13	(2)
2015–2017	Kitchee	5	(1)
2017–2020	Citizen	66	(37)
2020–2022	Wing Yee	20	(8)

International career
- Hong Kong U-23
2003–2012	Hong Kong	21	(4)
- * Club domestic league appearances and goals

Tailor Sham Kwok Keung (Chinese: 沈國強; Jyutping: sam^{2} gwok^{3} koeng^{4}, born 10 September 1985) is a Hong Kong former professional footballer who played as a left winger.

He is the younger brother of former professional footballer Sham Kwok Fai.

== Club career ==
=== Happy Valley ===
Both Sham and his older brother Sham Kwok Fai were youth products of Happy Valley. He was named the Best Young Player in the 2003-04 season. But since then, his progress has been hampered by injuries. At the end of the 2005–06 season he underwent surgery for his knee and spent 3 months recuperating. He regained a starting position but then twisted his ankle and broke half of his tendon, ending his season. The injuries caused him to change his shirt number from 12 to 13.

=== Shatin ===
Sham joined Shatin in the 2009-10 season, after Happy Valley was relegated. He scored a goal in the 7th minute against Tai Po to help the team win its first game by 4–1 on 24 October 2009.

Shatin SA was relegated at the end of the season. Sham thus moved to Citizen to replace Xu Deshuai who moved to South China.

=== Citizen ===
Sham scored the second goal with a header from brother Sham Kwok Fai's cross, for Citizen and helped the team overcome a 0–3 deficit in the 2010-11 Hong Kong Senior Challenge Shield final against South China, to eventually tie the match 3–3. Citizen went on to win the penalty shootout by 4–2 to win the trophy and qualified for the 2012 AFC Cup.

In the league, on 19 December 2010, Sham scored against Kitchee to earn a 1–1 draw for Citizen. In April 2011, he scored the only goal in Citizen's 1–0 win over Tai Chung FC. In all, he scored 6 goals for Citizen in the 2010–11 league season.

On 17 November 2011, he was diagnosed with a broken rib, sustained in the match in October against Tuen Mun when he was hit in the chest, and had to rest for 3 weeks. He did not therefore play against league champions Kitchee on 20 November 2011. On 6 January 2012, Sham scored a header in the 85th minute against South China to make it 3–2 to Citizen, but later he was sent off for two bookable offences. The match ended 3–3.

== International career ==
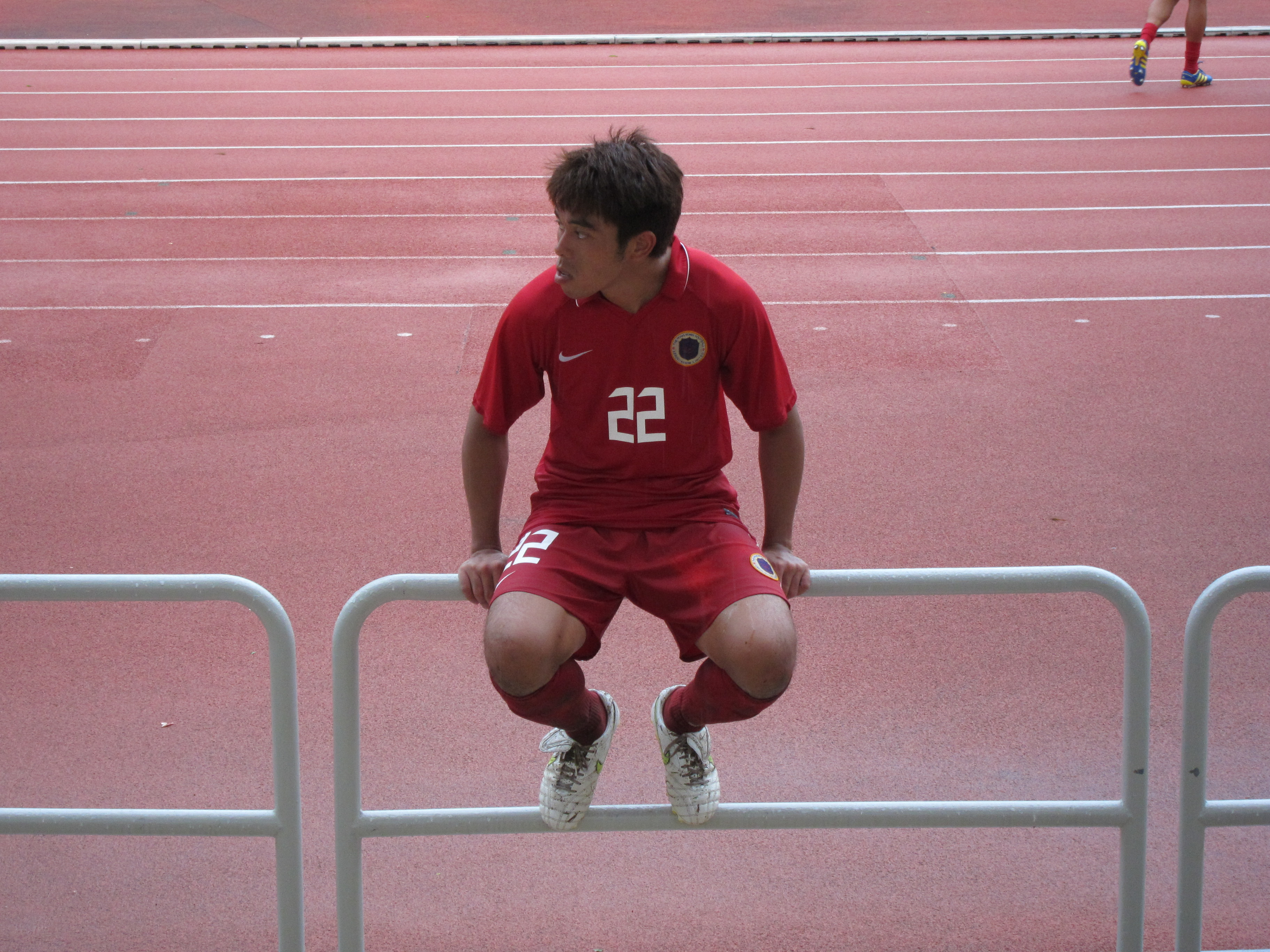
Sham playing for Hong Kong team in 2011

=== Hong Kong U-23 ===
Sham played in the 2006 Asian Games for Hong Kong. He scored a goal in the 8th minute against Iran national under-23 football team, but Hong Kong eventually lost the match 1–2.

Sham was a member of the Hong Kong national under-23 football team for the 2008 Beijing Olympics Asian qualifiers. He scored a goal with a bicycle kick and provided an assist to Chan Siu Ki to score and win the game 3–0 in the qualifying match away to Bangladesh. Hong Kong lost the home leg 0–1 but still proceeded to the next round.

=== Hong Kong ===
In a 2007 AFC Asian Cup qualifying game, Sham appeared as a substitute for Hong Kong against Uzbekistan and scored two goals in the 66th and 87th minute, to help Hong Kong gain a point from the game, thus keeping Hong Kong's hopes alive for qualification. Sham received great praise from coach Lai Sun Cheung after the match for his contribution. On 2 October 2011, Sham scored two goals for Hong Kong in the 2011 Long Teng Cup against Macau to help Hong Kong win the match by 5–1. He was then sent off after two bookable offences in the last match against Chinese Taipei, but Hong Kong still won 6–0.

=== Guangdong-Hong Kong Cup ===
In the 2011 Guangdong–Hong Kong Cup, Guangdong won its home leg 3–1. Sham scored the equalising goal in the return leg and Hong Kong drew the match 1–1, but Hong Kong lost the tie 4–2.

== Honours ==
=== Club ===
Happy Valley

- Hong Kong First Division: 2003–04, 2005–06
- Hong Kong Senior Shield: 2003–04
- Hong Kong FA Cup: 2003–04

Citizen

- Hong Kong Senior Shield: 2010–11

Kitchee

- Hong Kong Premier League: 2016–17
- Hong Kong Senior Shield: 2016–17
- Hong Kong FA Cup: 2016–17
- Hong Kong League Cup: 2015–16

=== Individual ===
- Hong Kong Senior Shield Top Scorer: 2003–04

== Career statistics ==
=== Club ===
As of 18 August 2006

Club	Season	League		League Cup		Senior Shield		FA Cup		AFC Cup		Total	
Club	Season	Apps	Goals	Apps	Goals	Apps	Goals	Apps	Goals	Apps	Goals	Apps	Goals
Happy Valley	2002–03	?	?	?	?	?	?	?	0	?	0	?	?
Happy Valley	2003–04	?	3	?	0	?	3	?	1	?	0	?	7
Happy Valley	2004–05	?	?	?	0	?	?	?	?	?	0	?	?
Happy Valley	2005–06	7	2	3	1	2	0	0	0	4	1	16	4
Happy Valley	2006–07	?	5	?	0	?	2	?	1	?	?	?	8
Happy Valley	2007–08	10	2	4	1	3	2	1	1	0	0	18	5
Happy Valley	2008–09	18	3	1	0	1	0	1	0	0	0	21	3
All													

=== International ===
As of 16 October 2012

#	Date	Venue	Opponent	Result	Record	Competition
1	6 November 2003	Pakhtakor Stadium, Tashkent, Uzbekistan	Uzbekistan	1–4	0	2004 AFC Asian Cup qualification
2	8 November 2003	Pakhtakor Stadium, Tashkent, Uzbekistan	Tajikistan	0–0	0	2004 AFC Asian Cup qualification
3	10 November 2003	Pakhtakor Stadium, Tashkent, Uzbekistan	Thailand	2–1	0	2004 AFC Asian Cup qualification
4	4 December 2003	National Stadium, Tokyo, Japan	South Korea	1–3	0	2003 EAFF Championship
5	18 February 2004	Darulmakmur Stadium, Penang, Malaysia	Malaysia	3–1	0	2006 FIFA World Cup qualification
6	30 November 2004	Jalan Besar Stadium, Singapore	Singapore	0–0 (6–5 PSO)	0	Friendly
7	2 December 2004	Jalan Besar Stadium, Singapore	Myanmar	2–2	0	Friendly
8	1 February 2006	Hong Kong Stadium, Hong Kong	Croatia	0–4	0	2006 Carlsberg Cup
9	15 February 2006	Hong Kong Stadium, Hong Kong	Singapore	1–1	0	Friendly
10	18 February 2006	Hong Kong Stadium, Hong Kong	India	2–2	0	Friendly
11	12 August 2006	Hong Kong Stadium, Hong Kong	Singapore	1–2	0	Friendly
12	16 August 2006	Pakhtakor Markaziy Stadium, Tashkent, Uzbekistan	Uzbekistan	2–2	2	2007 AFC Asian Cup qualification
13	6 September 2006	Hong Kong Stadium, Hong Kong	Uzbekistan	0–0	0	2007 AFC Asian Cup qualification
14	6 September 2006	Al Gharrafa Stadium, Doha, Qatar	Qatar	0–2	0	2007 AFC Asian Cup qualification
15	15 November 2006	Mong Kok Stadium, Hong Kong	Bangladesh	2–0	0	2007 AFC Asian Cup qualification
16	1 June 2007	Gelora Bung Karno Stadium, Jakarta, Indonesia	Indonesia	0–3	0	Friendly
17	10 June 2007	So Kon Po Recreation Ground, Hong Kong	Macau	2–1	0	2007 Hong Kong–Macau Interport
18	30 September 2011	Kaohsiung National Stadium, Kaohsiung, Taiwan	Philippines	3–3	0	2011 Long Teng Cup
19	2 October 2011	Kaohsiung National Stadium, Kaohsiung, Taiwan	Macau	5–1	2	2011 Long Teng Cup
20	4 October 2011	Kaohsiung National Stadium, Kaohsiung, Taiwan	Chinese Taipei	6–0	0	2011 Long Teng Cup
21	16 October 2012	Mong Kok Stadium, Mong Kok, Kowloon	Malaysia	0–3	0	Friendly

Awards
Preceded by Goldbert Chi Chiu	Hong Kong First Division League Best Youth Player Award (with Chan Siu Ki); 2003–04	Succeeded by Chan Siu Ki; Tse Tak Him
Preceded by to be confirmed	Hong Kong Senior Shield Top Scorer; 2003–04	Succeeded by to be confirmed
