= Chan Kong Pan =

Hong Kong footballer

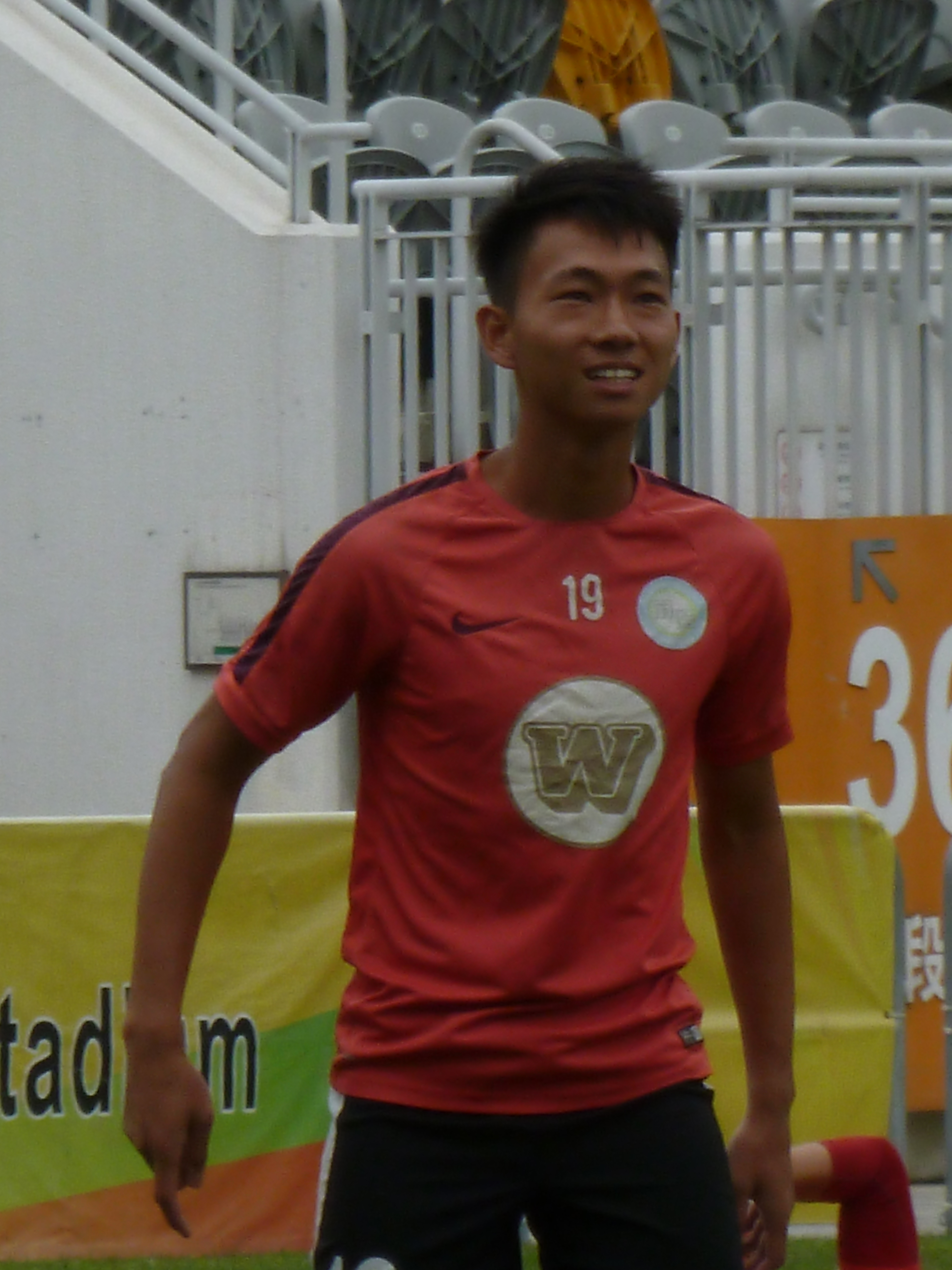

Personal information
- Full name: Leo Chan Kong Pan
- Date of birth: 13 April 1996 (age 30)
- Place of birth: Hong Kong
- Height: 1.75 m (5 ft 9 in)
- Position: Centre back

Youth career
- 2012–2013: South China

Senior career*
Years	Team	Apps	(Gls)
2013–2015	Pegasus	2	(0)
2015–2021	Southern	106	(1)
2021–2022	Tai Po	12	(0)
2022–2023	Eastern District	7	(1)
2023–2026	Yau Tsim Mong	52	(5)
2026–	Fu Moon	7	(0)
- * Club domestic league appearances and goals as of 31 May 2026

Leo Chan Kong Pan (Chinese: 陳港斌; Cantonese Yale: Chàn Góngbān, born 13 April 1996) is a former Hong Kong professional footballer who played as a centre back.

== Club career ==
On 10 January 2015, Chan made his professional debut in the Hong Kong Premier League in a 4–1 win for Pegasus.

In July 2015, Chan signed for Hong Kong Premier League club Southern.
