= 2015–16 Hong Kong League Cup =

13th edition of the Hong Kong League Cup

Tournament details
- Country: Hong Kong
- Teams: 9

Final positions
- Champions: Kitchee (5th title)
- Runners-up: South China

Tournament statistics
- Matches played: 19
- Goals scored: 60 (3.16 per match)
- Attendance: 19,012 (1,001 per match)

The 2015–16 Hong Kong League Cup is the 13th edition of the Hong Kong League Cup. The Cup is contested by the 9 teams in the 2015–16 Hong Kong Premier League. Kitchee won their 5th title on 9 April 2016.

== Calendar ==
Stage	Draw Date	Date	Matches	Clubs
Group Stage	19 October 2015	23 – 25 October, 21 – 22 November, 5 – 6, 19 December 2015, 13 – 14 February 2016	16	9 → 4
Semi-finals	19 October 2015	19 – 20 March 2016	2	4 → 2
Final	19 October 2015	9 April 2016 at Mong Kok Stadium	1	2 → 1

== Results ==
=== Group stage ===
==== Group A ====
Pos	Team	Pld	W	D	L	GF	GA	GD	Pts	Qualification
1	Kitchee	4	4	0	0	13	2	+11	12	Advance to semi-finals
2	South China	4	3	0	1	11	3	+8	9	Advance to semi-finals
3	Kwoon Chung Southern	4	1	1	2	4	8	−4	4	
4	Dreams Metro Gallery	4	1	0	3	2	8	−6	3	
5	Glory Sky Wong Tai Sin	4	0	1	3	2	11	−9	1	

Source: Hong Kong Football Association
Rules for classification: 1) Points; 2) Head-to-head points; 3) Head-to-head goal difference; 4) Head-to-head goals scored; 5) Goal difference; 6) Goals scored; 7) Fair-play points; 8) Drawing lots

23 October 2015 LC01	South China	3–0	Dreams Metro Gallery	Mong Kok, Hong Kong
20:00 UTC+8	Awal 23', 89'; Chan Siu Ki 61'	Report		Stadium: Mong Kok Stadium; Attendance: 994; Referee: Tong Kui Sum

24 October 2015 LC02	Glory Sky Wong Tai Sin	1–1	Kwoon Chung Southern	Sham Shui Po, Hong Kong
14:30 UTC+8	Nakamura 29'	Report	Garrido 57'	Stadium: Sham Shui Po Sports Ground; Attendance: 506; Referee: Ng Chiu Kok

21 November 2015 LC05	Glory Sky Wong Tai Sin	0–4	Kitchee	Kowloon Bay, Hong Kong
14:30 UTC+8		Report	Jordi 57'; Sandro 61'; Fu Shu Sing 67' (o.g.); Annan 76'	Stadium: Kowloon Bay Park; Attendance: 334; Referee: Lau Fong Hei

22 November 2015 LC06	Dreams Metro Gallery	0–2	Kwoon Chung Southern	Tsing Yi, Hong Kong
17:30 UTC+8		Report	Díaz 23'; Michael Luk 59'	Stadium: Tsing Yi Sports Ground; Attendance: 351; Referee: Tong Kui Sum

5 December 2015 LC08	Dreams Metro Gallery	2–0	Glory Sky Wong Tai Sin	Tsing Yi, Hong Kong
17:30 UTC+8	Lai Lok Yin 27'; Ngue 68' (pen.)	Report		Stadium: Tsing Yi Sports Ground; Attendance: 169; Referee: Chan Ming Siu

6 December 2015 LC09	Kitchee	2–1	South China	Tseung Kwan O, Hong Kong
14:30 UTC+8	Jordi 44'; Belencoso 88'	Report	Lam Hok Hei 90+3'	Stadium: Tseung Kwan O Sports Ground; Attendance: 1,379; Referee: Lau Fong Hei

19 December 2015 LC11	Kwoon Chung Southern	1–4	Kitchee	Mong Kok, Hong Kong
14:30 UTC+8	James Ha 22'	Report	Alex 56'; Fernando 68'; Dani 84'; Sham Kwok Keung 90+5'	Stadium: Mong Kok Stadium; Attendance: 767; Referee: Ho Wai Sing

19 December 2015 LC12	South China	4–1	Glory Sky Wong Tai Sin	Kowloon Bay, Hong Kong
17:30 UTC+8	Lam Hok Hei 15'; Itaparica 23'; Russell 39'; Lucas 54'	Report	Yeung Chi Lun 31'	Stadium: Kowloon Bay Park; Attendance: 458; Referee: Ng Kai Lam

13 February 2016 LC13	Kwoon Chung Southern	0–3	South China	Sham Shui Po, Hong Kong
14:30 UTC+8		Report	Borja 21'; Griffiths 76'; Liang Zicheng 84'	Stadium: Sham Shui Po Sports Ground; Attendance: 1,126; Referee: Ho Wai Sing

14 February 2016 LC15	Kitchee	3–0	Dreams Metro Gallery	Sham Shui Po, Hong Kong
14:30 UTC+8	Rufino 48'; Jordi 62', 66' (pen.)	Report		Stadium: Sham Shui Po Sports Ground; Attendance: 569; Referee: Lau Fong Hei

==== Group B ====
Pos	Team	Pld	W	D	L	GF	GA	GD	Pts	Qualification
1	Biu Chun Rangers	3	2	1	0	5	2	+3	7	Advance to semi-finals
2	Eastern	3	2	0	1	5	3	+2	6	Advance to semi-finals
3	Hong Kong Pegasus	3	1	1	1	2	3	−1	4	
4	Yuen Long	3	0	0	3	2	6	−4	0	

Source: Hong Kong Football Association
Rules for classification: 1) Points; 2) Head-to-head points; 3) Head-to-head goal difference; 4) Head-to-head goals scored; 5) Goal difference; 6) Goals scored; 7) Fair-play points; 8) Drawing lots

25 October 2015 LC03	Biu Chun Rangers	2–0	Eastern	Sham Shui Po, Hong Kong
14:30 UTC+8	Hui Ka Lok 17'; Landon Ling 24'	Report		Stadium: Sham Shui Po Sports Ground; Attendance: 1,037; Referee: Lau Fong Hei

25 October 2015 LC04	Hong Kong Pegasus	1–0	Yuen Long	Kowloon Bay, Hong Kong
17:30 UTC+8	Eduardo 69'	Report		Stadium: Kowloon Bay Park; Attendance: 283; Referee: Chan Ming Siu

5 December 2015 LC07	Eastern	2–0	Hong Kong Pegasus	Tseung Kwan O, Hong Kong
14:30 UTC+8	Lugo 12'; Barisic 57' (pen.)	Report		Stadium: Tseung Kwan O Sports Ground; Attendance: 957; Referee: Tong Kui Sum

6 December 2015 LC10	Yuen Long	1–2	Biu Chun Rangers	Tsing Yi, Hong Kong
17:30 UTC+8	Chan Cheuk Kwong 59'	Report	Beto 24' (pen.); Hui Ka Lok 65'	Stadium: Tsing Yi Sports Ground; Attendance: 210; Referee: Liu Kwok Man

13 February 2016 LC14	Eastern	3–1	Yuen Long	Tsing Yi, Hong Kong
17:30 UTC+8	Roberto 50'; Giovane 74', 90+1'	Report	Gustavo 80'	Stadium: Tsing Yi Sports Ground; Attendance: 734; Referee: Tang Hing Fu

14 February 2016 LC16	Hong Kong Pegasus	1–1	Biu Chun Rangers	Tsing Yi, Hong Kong
17:30 UTC+8	Eduardo 20'	Report	Chuck Yiu Kwok 39'	Stadium: Tsing Yi Sports Ground; Attendance: 298; Referee: Tong Kui Sum

=== Semi-finals ===
19 March 2016 LC17	Kitchee	6–1	Eastern	Mong Kok, Hong Kong
15:00 UTC+8	Sandro 1', 72'; Rufino 14', 26', 76', 82'	Report	Roberto 45+2'	Stadium: Mong Kok Stadium; Attendance: 2,994; Referee: Ho Wai Sing

20 March 2016 LC18	Biu Chun Rangers	2–2 (a.e.t.) (1–3 p)	South China	Mong Kok, Hong Kong
15:00 UTC+8	Cheng Siu Kwan 7'; Fofo 85' (o.g.)	Report	Borja 38'; Awal 80'	Stadium: Mong Kok Stadium; Attendance: 1,230; Referee: Tong Kui Sum
	Penalties
	Beto (penalty missed); Mauricio (penalty missed); Su Yang (penalty missed); Lendresse (penalty scored)		(penalty missed) Borja; (penalty missed) Liang Zicheng; (penalty scored) Law Hiu Chung; (penalty scored) Mora; (penalty scored) Awal

=== Final ===
9 April 2016 LC19	Kitchee	3–0	South China	Mong Kok, Hong Kong
15:00 UTC+8	Alex 4', 65'; Rufino 58' (pen.)	Report		Stadium: Mong Kok Stadium; Attendance: 4,616; Referee: Ho Wai Sing
