= Diego Garrido =

Spanish footballer

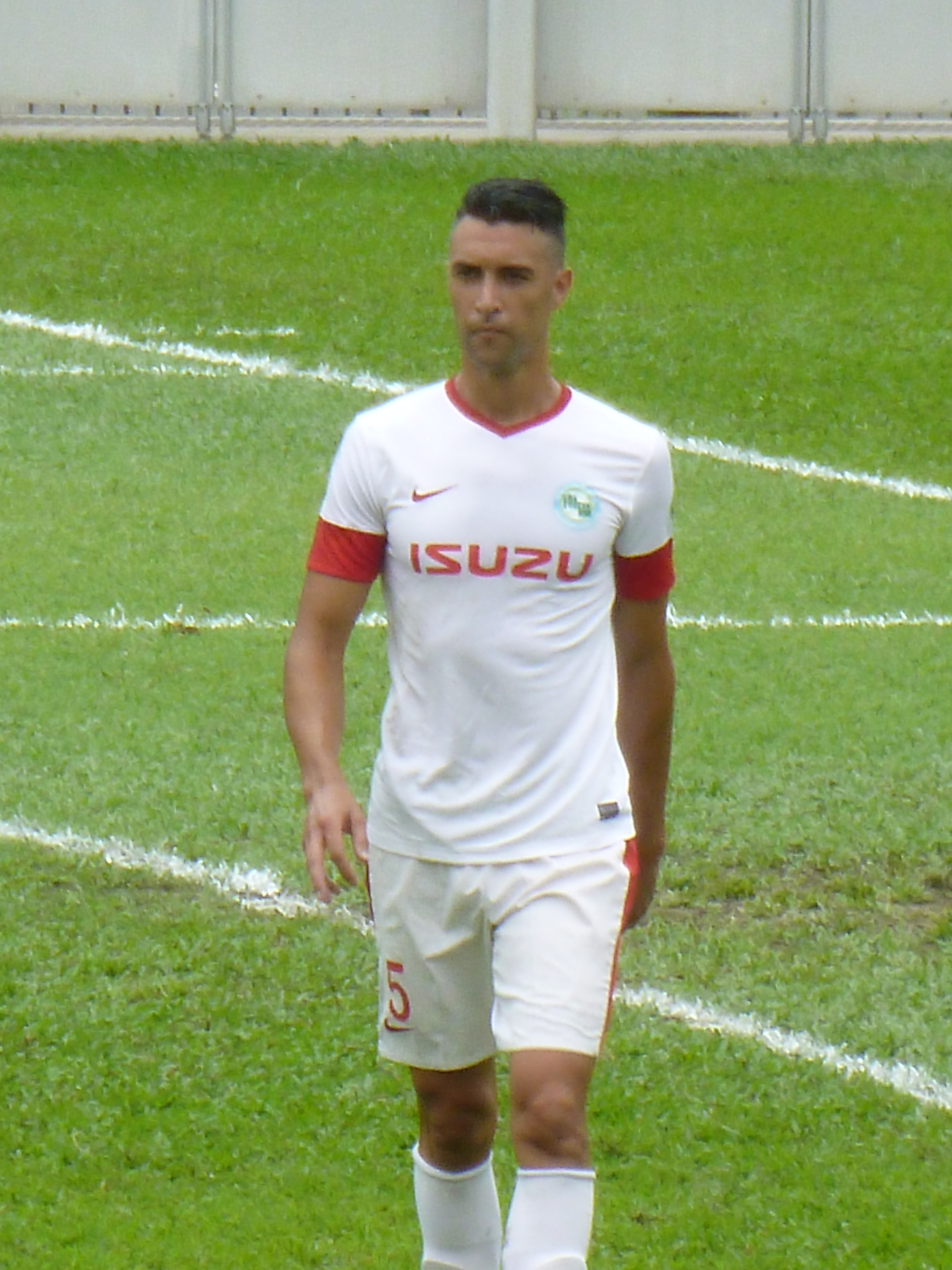

Personal information
- Full name: Diego Garrido Garcia
- Date of birth: 20 June 1984 (age 42)
- Place of birth: Santander, Spain
- Height: 1.90 m (6 ft 3 in)
- Position: Centre back

Youth career
- 2003–2004: Rayo Cantabria
- 2004–2005: Racing Santander

Senior career*
Years	Team	Apps	(Gls)
2005–2007	Racing B	60	(4)
2007–2008	Castelldefels	35	(3)
2008–2009	Dénia	33	(2)
2009–2010	Racing Ferrol	32	(3)
2010–2011	Conquense	32	(4)
2011–2012	Lugo	16	(4)
2012–2013	Cádiz	11	(0)
2013	Orihuela	7	(1)
2013–2014	Logroñés	18	(0)
2014–2015	La Roda	36	(3)
2015–2018	Southern	41	(5)
2018–2020	Racing Ferrol	47	(3)
2020–2021	Somozas	26	(2)
- * Club domestic league appearances and goals

Diego Garrido Garcia (born 20 June 1984), commonly known as Diego Garrido, is a Spanish former professional football player.
