= Tse Tak Him =

Hong Kong footballer (born 1985)

Personal information
- Full name: Tse Tak Him
- Date of birth: 10 February 1985 (age 41)
- Place of birth: Hong Kong
- Height: 1.81 m (5 ft 11 in)
- Position: Goalkeeper

Youth career
- South China

Senior career*
Years	Team	Apps	(Gls)
2003–2004	Hong Kong 08	0	(0)
2004–2014	Citizen	141	(0)
2014–2015	Pegasus	6	(0)
2015–2023	Southern	92	(0)

International career^{‡}
2007	Hong Kong U-23	1	(0)
2004–2019	Hong Kong	10	(0)
- * Club domestic league appearances and goals as of 7 May 2023 ‡ National team caps and goals as of 14 December 2019

Tse Tak Him
- Traditional Chinese: 謝德謙
- Simplified Chinese: 谢德谦
Transcriptions
Standard Mandarin
- Hanyu Pinyin: Xiè Déqiān
Yue: Cantonese
- Jyutping: Ze3 Dak1him1

Tse Tak Him (Chinese: 謝德謙; Jyutping: ze^{6} dak^{1} him^{1}; born 10 February 1985) is a Hong Kong former professional footballer who played as a goalkeeper.

== Club career ==
=== Citizen ===
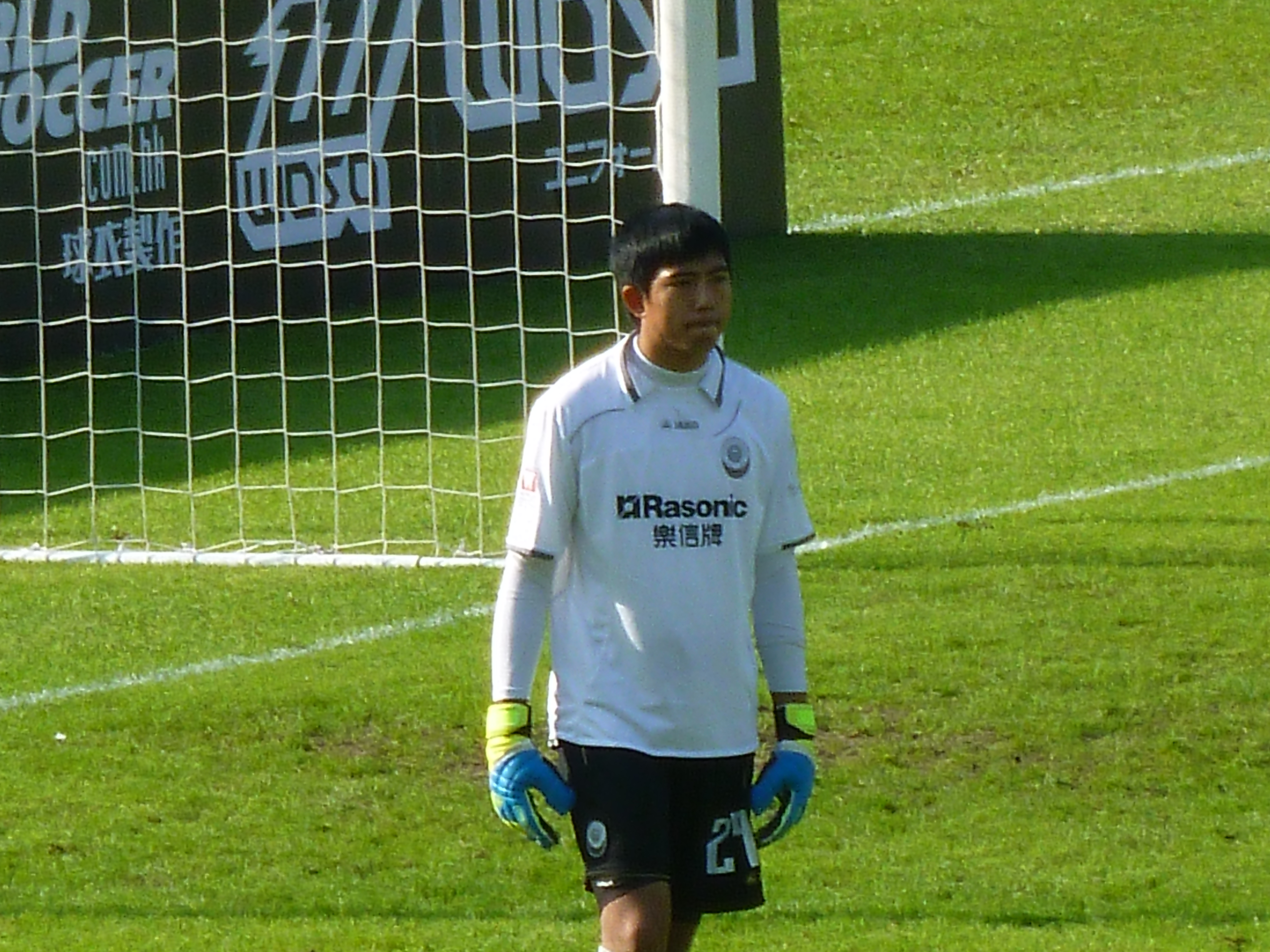
Tse playing for Citizen in 2012

During the 2010–11 Hong Kong Senior Challenge Shield final against defending champions South China, Tse saved a penalty by Chan Siu Ki in the match, another one by Li Haiqiang in the penalty shoot-out, and helped the team win the match by 7:5 on penalties.

In 2014 Lunar New Year Cup, Tse led Citizen Cuenca United to defeat Russian Premier League club Krylia Sovetov in the semi-finals. He saved a penalty and won the match by 4–2. Citizen Cuenca United finally became the champions.

=== Southern ===
Tse joined Southern in 2015 on 9 July. His contract was renewed in July 2017.

In May 2023, Tse announced his retirement from professional football.

=== Konger ===
In 2023, Tse joined English 14th Division side Konger FC.

== Honours ==
=== Club ===
Citizen

- Hong Kong Senior Shield: 2010–11

Southern

- Hong Kong Sapling Cup: 2022–23

=== Individual ===
- Hong Kong First Division League Best Youth Player: 2004–05, 2005–06

== Career statistics ==
=== Club ===
As of 20 May 2021

Club	Season	League		Senior Shield		League Cup		FA Cup		AFC Cup		Total	
Club	Season	Apps	Goals	Apps	Goals	Apps	Goals	Apps	Goals	Apps	Goals	Apps	Goals
Citizen	2009–10	16	0	-		-		-		-		16	0
Citizen	2010–11	13	0	-		-		1	0	-		14	0
Citizen	2011–12	14	0	-		2	0	1	0	6	0	23	0
Citizen	2012–13	18	0	6	0	-		1	0	-		15	0
Citizen	2013–14	20	0	1	0	-		2	0	-		23	0
Pegasus	2014–15	6	0	0	0	1	0	1	0	-		8	0
Southern	2015–16	14	0	4	0	2	0	3	0	-		23	0
Southern	2016–17	20	0	2	0	-		2	0	-		24	0
Southern	2017–18	15	0	2	0	-		2	0	-		19	0
Southern	2018–19	14	0	1	0	-		2	0	-		17	0
Southern	2019–20	14	0	1	0	-		0	0	-		15	0
Southern	2020–21	12	0	-		-		-		-		12	0
	Total	176	0	17	0	5	0	15	0	6	0	209	0

=== International ===
==== Hong Kong ====
As of 14 December 2019

#	Date	Venue	Opponent	Result	Goals	Competition
1	2 December 2004	Jalan Besar Stadium, Singapore	Myanmar	2–2	0	Friendly
2	5 March 2005	Chungshan Soccer Stadium, Taipei, Taiwan	Mongolia	6–0	0	2005 EAFF Championship Preliminary
3	7 March 2005	Chungshan Soccer Stadium, Taipei, Taiwan	Guam	15–0	0	2005 EAFF Championship Preliminary
4	11 March 2005	Chungshan Soccer Stadium, Taipei, Taiwan	Chinese Taipei	5–0	0	2005 EAFF Championship Preliminary
5	19 November 2008	Macau UST Stadium, Macau	Macau	9–1	0	Friendly
6	6 January 2010	National Stadium, Madinat 'Isa, Bahrain	Bahrain	0–4	0	2011 AFC Asian Cup qualification
7	17 November 2010	Hong Kong Stadium, Hong Kong	Paraguay	0–7	0	Friendly
8	2 October 2011	Kaohsiung National Stadium, Kaohsiung, Taiwan	Macau	5–1	0	2011 Long Teng Cup
9	14 December 2019	Busan Gudeok Stadium, Busan, South Korea	Japan	0–5	0	2019 EAFF E-1 Football Championship

==== Hong Kong U-23 ====
As of 28 September 2010

#	Date	Venue	Opponents	Result	Goals	Competition
1	28 March 2007	Mong Kok Stadium, Hong Kong	Malaysia	0–1	0	2008 Summer Olympics qualification
2	28 September 2010	Sai Tso Wan Recreation Ground, Hong Kong	Australia	2–2	0	Friendly

Awards
Preceded by Chan Siu Ki; Sham Kwok Keung	Hong Kong First Division League Best Youth Player Award; 2004–05 with Chan Siu Ki	Succeeded by Cheung Kin Fung; Tse Tak Him
Preceded by Chan Siu Ki; Tse Tak Him	Hong Kong First Division League Best Youth Player Award; 2005–06 with Cheung Kin Fung	Succeeded by Leung Chun Pong; Chan Siu Ki
