= Wellingsson de Souza =

Brazilian-born Hong Kong footballer (born 1989)

Wellingsson
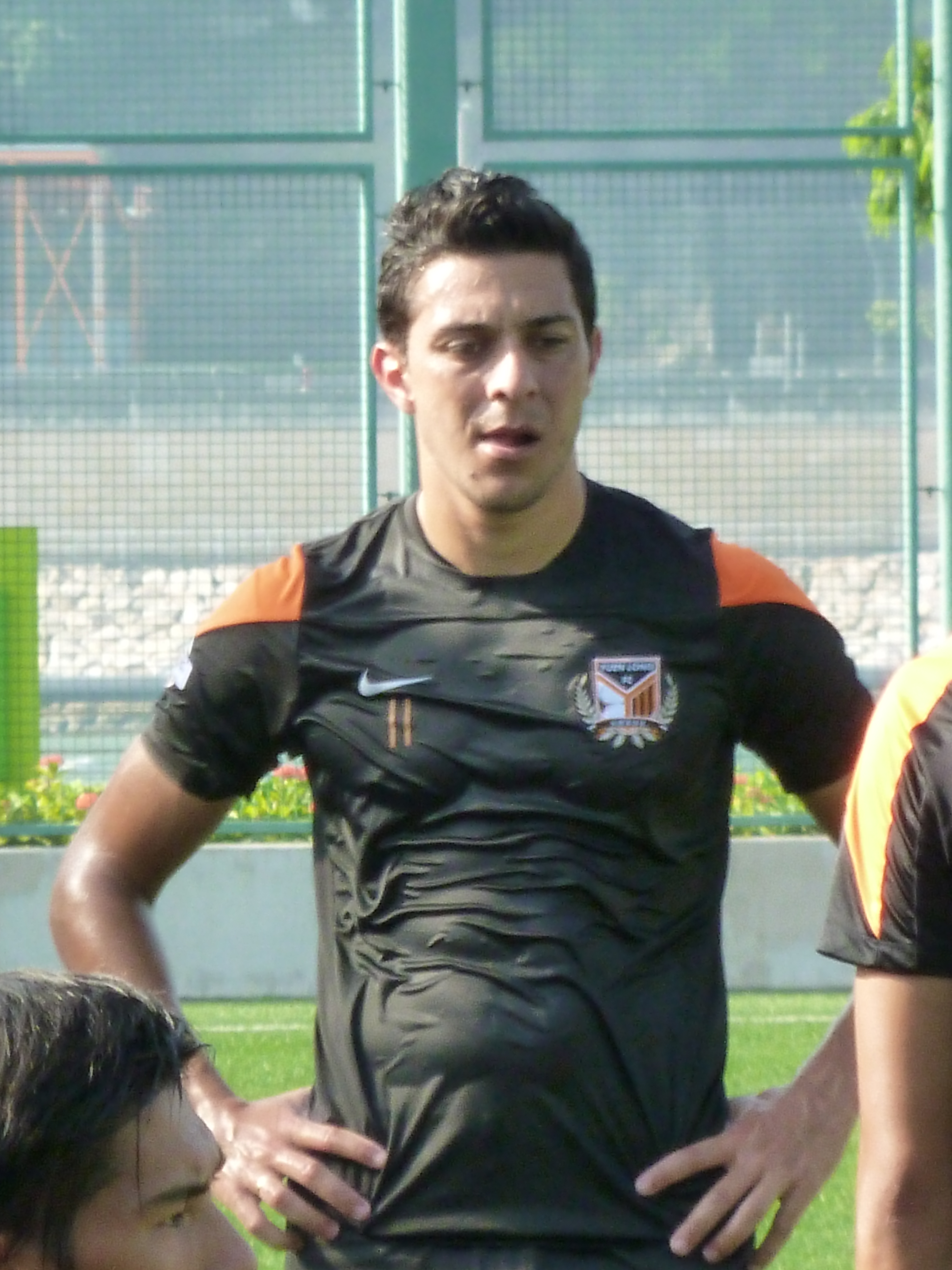
- Souza in 2013

Personal information
- Full name: Wellingsson de Souza
- Date of birth: 7 September 1989 (age 37)
- Place of birth: Guarujá, Brazil
- Height: 1.84 m (6 ft 0 in)
- Position: Left winger

Youth career
- 2005–2006: Ponte Preta
- 2006–2007: São Caetano
- 2007–2008: Corinthians

Senior career*
Years	Team	Apps	(Gls)
2008–2009	Sumare		
2009	Brasilis		
2009–2012	South China	28	(10)
2013–2015	Yuen Long	33	(14)
2015–2019	Southern	69	(25)
2019–2022	Kitchee	17	(8)
2024	Sham Shui Po	11	(2)
2024–2025	Central & Western	24	(16)
2025–2026	Sham Shui Po	11	(9)
2026–	Tung Sing	7	(10)
- * Club domestic league appearances and goals as of 17 May2026

Wellingsson de Souza (Chinese: 蘇沙; born 7 September 1989), commonly known as Wellingsson or Souza, is a former professional footballer who played as a left winger. Born in Brazil, he acquired his HKSAR passport in October 2021.

== Club career ==
=== Early career ===
Wellingsson played for some Campeonato Brasileiro Série A football team youth squads before, such as Associação Atlética Ponte Preta, Sport Club Corinthians Paulista and Associação Desportiva São Caetano.

=== South China ===
When Wellingsson was 20 years old, Hong Kong First Division League champions South China signed him as a youth squad player, with the hope that he would be able to represent Hong Kong after residing in the country for 7 years.

Wellingsson played in South China's reserve team at the beginning. His debut match for the first team was against Sun Hei on 2 February 2010 when he substituted Kwok Kin Pong at the 86th minute.

On 7 March 2010 in the match against Rangers, Wellingsson substituted Hinson Leung at the 69th minute and scored at the 88th minute. This was Wellingsson's first goal in the Hong Kong First Division League, helping his club to win the match 5–2.

During the summer of 2011, he joined Partizan for a try-out and played 4 friendly games with the first team, but he returned to South China's training camp in South Korea.

On 10 April 2012, South China terminated their contract with Wellingsson after the player left Hong Kong without notifying the club in advance.

=== Yuen Long ===
On 17 June 2013, Wellingsson returned to Hong Kong and joined newly promoted Hong Kong First Division club Yuen Long for free after being unattached for a year. On 31 August 2013, he netted a brace on his debut for Yuen Long while the match ended 2–2.

=== Southern ===
Wellingsson signed with Southern in the summer of 2015 and went on to score 25 goals in 69 league appearances with the club in 4 years.

On 31 May 2019, Southern announced that Wellingsson would leave the club.

=== Kitchee ===
On 3 July 2019, Kitchee announced the signing of Wellingsson.

On 2 January 2022, Wellingsson extended his contract with Kitchee until the end of the 2021–22 season.

On 31 May 2022, Wellingsson left the club after finishing his contract.

=== Sham Shui Po ===
On 26 January 2024, Wellingsson joined Sham Shui Po. Wellingsson then scored four goals in a match against HK U23 in his first start of the season.

== International career ==
On 19 October 2021, Wellingsson officially announced that he had received a Hong Kong passport, making him eligible to represent Hong Kong internationally.

== Honours ==
=== Club ===
South China

- Hong Kong First Division: 2009–10
- Hong Kong Senior Shield: 2009–10

Kitchee

- Hong Kong Premier League: 2019–20, 2020–21
- Hong Kong Sapling Cup: 2019–20

== External sources ==
- Wellingsson de Souza at Soccerway
- Wellingsson de Souza at HKFA
- Wellingsson de Souza on Instagram
- Wellingsson de Souza on Facebook
