= 2019–20 Southern District FC season =

Southern 2019–20 season
- President: Matthew Wong
- Chairman: Chan Man Chun
- Head Coach: Zesh Rehman
- Stadium: Aberdeen Sports Ground
- Premier League: 5th
- Senior Shield: Quarter-finals
- FA Cup: Quarter-finals
- Sapling Cup: Runner-up
- Highest home attendance: 1,026 (vs Kitchee, 19 October 2019)
- Lowest home attendance: 537 (vs Rangers, 24 November 2019)
Home colours	Away colours

The 2019–20 season is Southern's 7th season in the top-tier division in Hong Kong football. Southern will compete in the Premier League, Senior Challenge Shield, FA Cup and Sapling Cup this season.

== Squad ==
=== First Team ===
As of 30 June 2020

Note: Flags indicate national team as defined under FIFA eligibility rules; some limited exceptions apply. Players may hold more than one non-FIFA nationality.

No.	Pos.	Nation	Player
1	GK	HKG	Choy Tsz To
4	DF	JPN	Kota Kawase ^{FP}
6	DF	PAK	Zesh Rehman ^{FP}
7	FW	JPN	Shu Sasaki ^{FP}
8	MF	HKG	Lau Ho Lam (on loan from Eastern)
11	FW	BRA	Stefan Pereira ^{FP}
12	DF	HKG	Hui Wang Fung
13	FW	HKG	Chan Kwong Ho
14	FW	HKG	James Ha
16	MF	HKG	Chan Siu Kwan
17	GK	HKG	Li Yat Chun

No.	Pos.	Nation	Player
18	DF	HKG	Jack Sealy
19	DF	IDN	Stefan Antonić ^{LP}
20	DF	BRA	Beto ^{LP}
21	MF	HKG	Christopher Chung
22	MF	HKG	Cheng Chun Wang
26	MF	HKG	Chan Hoi Pak
29	GK	HKG	Tse Tak Him (captain)
30	MF	HKG	Wong Hin Chung
34	DF	HKG	Chan Kong Pan
––	MF	POR	Pedro Mendes ^{FP}

Remarks:
^{LP} These players are registered as local players in Hong Kong domestic football competitions.
^{FP} These players are registered as foreign players.

== Transfers ==
=== Transfers in ===
Date from	Position	Nationality	Name	From	Fee	Ref.
1 June 2019	FW	(Australia)	Travis Major	Pegasus	Free	
1 June 2019	FW	(Hong Kong)	Chan Kwong Ho	Yuen Long	Free	
27 June 2019	DF	(Japan)	Kota Kawase	Dreams FC	Free	
1 July 2019	MF	(Hong Kong)	Chan Siu Kwan	Tai Po	Free	
3 July 2019	DF	(Hong Kong)	Jack Sealy	Pegasus	Free	
12 July 2019	MF	(Hong Kong)	Cheng Chun Wang	Youth team	Free	
12 July 2019	MF	(Hong Kong)	Wong Hin Chung	Youth team	Free	
25 July 2019	DF	(Hong Kong)	Lau Wing Sang	Hoi King	Free	
13 September 2019	MF	(Hong Kong)	Emmet Wan	Free agent	Free	
2 January 2020	MF	(Argentina)	Gabriel Méndez	Pegasus	Free	
2 May 2020	MF	(Japan)	Shu Sasaki	Pegasus	Free	
6 June 2020	FW	(Brazil)	Stefan Pereira	Rangers	Free	
6 June 2020	DF	(Indonesia) (Serbia) (Hong Kong)	Stefan Antonić	Kitchee Reserves	Free	
June 2020	MF	(Hong Kong)	Lau Ho Lam	Eastern	Free	
July 2020	MF	(Portugal)	Pedro Mendes	Free agent	Free	

=== Transfers out ===
Date from	Position	Nationality	Name	To	Fee	Ref.
1 July 2019	DF	(Hong Kong)	Sham Kwok Fai	Citizen	Released	
1 July 2019	DF	(Hong Kong)	Lau Hok Ming	Eastern	Released	
1 July 2019	DF	(Hong Kong)	Che Runqiu	Tai Po	Released	
1 July 2019	MF	(Serbia)	Marko Krasic	(Montenegro) FK Rudar Pljevlja	Released	
1 July 2019	MF	(Hong Kong)	Chan Man Fai	Tai Po	Released	
1 July 2019	MF	(Hong Kong)	Michael Luk	Tai Po	Released	
1 July 2019	MF	(Hong Kong)	Emmet Wan		Released	
1 July 2019	FW	(Brazil)	Wellingsson	Kitchee	Released	
7 December 2019	MF	(Hong Kong)	Emmet Wan	Citizen	Released	
7 December 2019	FW	(Serbia)	Nikola Komazec	Kitchee	Released	
27 April 2020	MF	(Brazil)	Ticão		Released	
27 April 2020	MF	(Argentina)	Gabriel Méndez		Released	
27 April 2020	FW	(Australia)	Travis Major		Released	
27 April 2020	FW	(Brazil)	Dhiego Martins		Released	
1 July 2020	DF	(Hong Kong)	Ng Kai Yui		Released	
1 July 2020	DF	(Hong Kong)	Lau Wing Sang		Released	
1 July 2020	DF	(United States) (New Zealand) (Hong Kong)	Shay Spitz		Released	
1 July 2020	MF	(Hong Kong)	Lau Ka Ming		Released	

=== Loans in ===
Start Date	End Date	Position	Nationality	Name	From Club	Fee	Ref.
2 July 2019	31 May 2020	MF	(Hong Kong)	Lau Ho Lam	Eastern	Undisclosed	

== Team staff ==
Position	Staff
Head coach	(Pakistan) Zesh Rehman
Assistant coach	(Hong Kong) Pui Ho Wang
Assistant coach	(Hong Kong) Cristiano Cordeiro
Assistant coach	(Hong Kong) Sham Kwok Fai
Conditioning coach	(United States) Shay Spitz
Goalkeeping coach	(Spain) Marc Gamon
Physiotherapists	(Hong Kong) Ella Yeung (Hong Kong) Fong Ho Kee

== Competitions ==
=== Hong Kong Premier League ===
==== Table ====
Pos	Team	Pld	W	D	L	GF	GA	GD	Pts	Qualification or relegation
3	(China) R&F (D)	10	5	3	2	21	15	+6	18	Withdrew from league system, club folded (Note: R&F withdrew from the league system after the end of the season and folded.)
4	Lee Man	10	5	1	4	16	14	+2	16	Qualification for AFC Cup group stage
5	Southern	10	2	4	4	15	21	−6	10	
6	Happy Valley	10	0	1	9	6	31	−25	1	
7	Pegasus (D)	0	0	0	0	0	0	0	0	Withdrew, record expunged (Note: Pegasus and Rangers withdrew from the league due to the 2020 coronavirus pandemic in Hong Kong, and their records were expunged.)

Source: Hong Kong Football Association
Rules for classification: 1) Points; 2) Head-to-head points; 3) Head-to-head goal difference; 4) Head-to-head goals scored; 5) Goal difference; 6) Goals scored; 7) Fair-play points; 8) Drawing lots (Play-off if the winner has to be decided).
(D) Disqualified
Notes:

Win Draw Loss

=== Hong Kong Sapling Cup ===
==== Group stage ====
Pos	Team	Pld	W	D	L	GF	GA	GD	Pts	Qualification
1	Southern (A)	8	4	3	1	8	5	+3	15	Advance to Final
2	(China) R&F	8	4	1	3	18	12	+6	13	
3	Yuen Long	8	3	3	2	19	17	+2	12	
4	Happy Valley	8	2	2	4	13	17	−4	8	
5	Tai Po	8	1	3	4	18	25	−7	6	

Source: Hong Kong Football Association
Rules for classification: 1) Points; 2) Head-to-head points; 3) Head-to-head goal difference; 4) Goal difference; 5) Goals scored.
(A) Advance to a further round
