= 2015–16 Dreams Metro Gallery FC season =

Dream Metro Gallery FC
2015–16 season
- Chairman: Lo Man Fai
- Head coach: (Hong Kong) Leung Chi Wing (Hong Kong) Chu Siu Kei
- Home ground: Sham Shui Po Sports Ground (Capacity: 2,194)
- Premier League: 6th
- Senior Shield: TBC
- FA Cup: TBC
Home colours	Away colours

The 2015–16 season is Dreams Metro Gallery's debut season in the top-tier division in Hong Kong football. They will compete in the Premier League, Senior Challenge Shield and FA Cup in this season.

== Key events ==
- 17 July 2015: Hong Kong defender Leung Kwok Wai joins the club from Eastern on a free transfer.
- 17 July 2015: Hong Kong goalkeeper Pang Tsz Kin joins the club from Yuen Long on a free transfer.
- 17 July 2015: Hong Kong defender Wong Tsz Ho, Lee Ka Wah, Vasudeva das Lilley Nunez and Yiu Ho Ming join the club on loan from Eastern until the end of the season.
- 17 July 2015: Hong Kong midfielder Li Ka Chun, Eugene Mbome, Lau Ho Lam and Tse Long Hin join the club on loan from Eastern until the end of the season.
- 17 July 2015: Hong Kong goalkeeper Li Yat Chun joins the club on loan from Eastern until the end of the season.
- 17 July 2015: Hong Kong midfielder Chu Siu Kei, Chung Wai Keung, Lai Lok Yin, Siu Chun Ming, Lui Wai Chiu and Chow Win Yin join the club from Metro Gallery Sun Source on a free transfer.
- 17 July 2015: Hong Kong defender Lo Tsz Hin and Siu Pui Lam join the club from Metro Gallery Sun Source on a free transfer.
- 17 July 2015: Japanese striker Kenji Fukuda joins the club from YFCMD on a free transfer. Cameroon striker Paul Ngue joins the club from Metro Gallery Sun Source on a free transfer.
- 17 July 2015: Hong Kong goalkeeper To Chun Kiu joins the club from YFCMD on a free transfer.
- 17 July 2015: Spanish Pablo Gallardo joins the club from Arroyo CP on a free transfer.
- 2 September 2015: Brazilian defender Clayton Michel Afonso joins the club on loan from Eastern until the end of the season.

== Players ==
=== Squad information ===
N	P	Nat.	Name	Date of birth	Age	Since	Previous club	Notes
1	GK	(Hong Kong)	Pang Tsz Kin^{LP}	16 December 1986	29	2015	(Hong Kong) Yuen Long	
3	DF	(Hong Kong)	Lo Tsz Hin^{LP}	13 November 1996	19	2015	(Hong Kong) Metro Gallery Sun Source	
4	DF	(Brazil)	Clayton Michel Afonso^{FP}	18 July 1988	27	2015	(Hong Kong) Eastern	On loan from Eastern
5	DF	(Spain)	Pablo Gallardo^{FP}	19 February 1986	29	2015	(Spain) Arroyo CP	
7	MF	(Hong Kong)	Chu Siu Kei^{LP}	11 January 1980	35	2015	(Hong Kong) Metro Gallery Sun Source	
8	MF	(Hong Kong)	Li Ka Chun^{LP}	10 September 1993	22	2015	(Hong Kong) Eastern	On loan from Eastern
9	MF	(Hong Kong)	Chung Wai Keung^{LP}	21 October 1995	20	2015	(Hong Kong) Metro Gallery Sun Source	
10	MF	(Hong Kong)	Lai Lok Yin^{LP}	20 July 1995	20	2015	(Hong Kong) Metro Gallery Sun Source	
11	MF	(Hong Kong)	Siu Chun Ming^{LP}	27 December 1995	20	2015	(Hong Kong) Metro Gallery Sun Source	
12	GK	(Hong Kong)	Li Yat Chun^{LP}	8 December 1995	20	2015	(Hong Kong) Eastern	On loan from Eastern
13	DF	(Hong Kong)	Siu Pui Lam^{LP}	31 December 1996	19	2015	(Hong Kong) Metro Gallery Sun Source	
14	MF	(Hong Kong)	Lui Wai Chiu^{LP}	22 September 1995	20	2015	(Hong Kong) Metro Gallery Sun Source	
17	GK	(Hong Kong)	To Chun Kiu^{LP}	17 July 1994	21	2015	(Hong Kong) YFCMD	
18	MF	(Cameroon)	Eugene Mbome^{LP}	29 August 1986	29	2015	(Hong Kong) Biu Chun Rangers	On loan from Eastern
19	MF	(Hong Kong)	Yiu Ho Ming^{LP}	1 May 1995	20	2015	(Hong Kong) Eastern	On loan from Eastern
20	FW	(Japan)	Kenji Fukuda^{FP}	21 October 1977	38	2015	(Hong Kong) YFCMD	
21	MF	(Hong Kong)	Lau Ho Lam^{LP}	22 January 1993	22	2015	(Hong Kong) Eastern	On loan from Eastern
22	DF	(Hong Kong)	Vasudeva das Lilley Nunez^{LP}	22 November 1995	20	2015	(Hong Kong) Eastern	On loan from Eastern
23	DF	(Hong Kong)	Leung Kwok Wai^{LP}	23 February 1986	29	2015	(Hong Kong) Eastern	
24	DF	(Hong Kong)	Lee Ka Wah^{LP}	6 December 1996	19	2015	(Hong Kong) Eastern	On loan from Eastern
27	FW	(Cameroon)	Paul Ngue^{FP}	2 February 1988	27	2015	(Hong Kong) Metro Gallery Sun Source	
30	MF	(Hong Kong)	Wong Tsz Ho^{LP}	7 March 1994	21	2015	(Hong Kong) Eastern	On loan from Eastern
33	MF	(Hong Kong)	Chow Win Yin^{LP}	7 April 1996	19	2015	(Hong Kong) Metro Gallery Sun Source	
95	MF	(Hong Kong)	Tse Long Hin^{LP}	6 February 1995	20	2015	(Hong Kong) Eastern	On loan from Eastern

As of 11 September 2015

Ordered by squad number.
^{LP}Local player; ^{FP}Foreign player; ^{NR}Non-registered player

== Transfers ==
=== In ===
==== Summer ====
No.	Pos	Player	Transferred From	Fee	Date	Source
1	GK	(Hong Kong) Pang Tsz Kin	(Hong Kong) Yuen Long	Free transfer	17 July 2015	
3	DF	(Hong Kong) Lo Tsz Kin	(Hong Kong) Metro Gallery Sun Source	Free transfer	17 July 2015	
6	DF	(Spain) Pablo Gallardo	(Spain) Arroyo CP	Free transfer	17 July 2015	
7	MF	(Hong Kong) Chu Siu Kei	(Hong Kong) Metro Gallery Sun Source	Free transfer	17 July 2015	
9	MF	(Hong Kong) Chung Wai Keung	(Hong Kong) Metro Gallery Sun Source	Free transfer	17 July 2015	
10	MF	(Hong Kong) Lai Lok Yin	(Hong Kong) Metro Gallery Sun Source	Free transfer	17 July 2015	
11	MF	(Hong Kong) Siu Chun Ming	(Hong Kong) Metro Gallery Sun Source	Free transfer	17 July 2015	
13	DF	(Hong Kong) Siu Pui Lam	(Hong Kong) Metro Gallery Sun Source	Free transfer	17 July 2015	
14	MF	(Hong Kong) Lui Wai Chiu	(Hong Kong) Metro Gallery Sun Source	Free transfer	17 July 2015	
17	GK	(Hong Kong) To Chun Kiu	(Hong Kong) YFCMD	Free transfer	17 July 2015	
20	FW	(Hong Kong) Kenji Fukuda	(Hong Kong) YFCMD	Free transfer	17 July 2015	
27	FW	(Hong Kong) Paul Ngue	(Hong Kong) Metro Gallery Sun Source	Free transfer	17 July 2015	
33	MF	(Hong Kong) Chow Win Yin	(Hong Kong) Metro Gallery Sun Source	Free transfer	17 July 2015	

=== Out ===
==== Summer ====
No.	Pos	Player	Transferred To	Fee	Date	Source

=== Loan In ===
==== Summer ====
No.	Pos	Player	Loaned From	Start	End	Source
8	MF	(Hong Kong) Li Ka Chun	(Hong Kong) Eastern	17 July 2015	31 May 2016	
12	GK	(Hong Kong) Li Yat Chun	(Hong Kong) Eastern	17 July 2015	31 May 2016	
18	MF	(Hong Kong) Eugene Mbome	(Hong Kong) Eastern	17 July 2015	31 May 2016	
19	MF	(Hong Kong) Yiu Ho Ming	(Hong Kong) Eastern	17 July 2015	31 May 2016	
21	MF	(Hong Kong) Lau Ho Lam	(Hong Kong) Eastern	17 July 2015	31 May 2016	
22	DF	(Hong Kong) Vasudeva das Lilley Nunez	(Hong Kong) Eastern	17 July 2015	31 May 2016	
24	DF	(Hong Kong) Lee Ka Wah	(Hong Kong) Eastern	17 July 2015	31 May 2016	
30	MF	(Hong Kong) Wong Tsz Ho	(Hong Kong) Eastern	17 July 2015	31 May 2016	
95	MF	(Hong Kong) Tse Long Hin	(Hong Kong) Eastern	17 July 2015	31 May 2016	
4	DF	(Hong Kong) Clayton Michel Afonso	(Hong Kong) Eastern	2 September 2015	31 May 2016	

=== Loan Out ===
==== Summer ====
No.	Pos	Player	Loaned To	Start	End	Source

== Club ==
=== Coaching staff ===
Position	Staff
Head Coach	(Hong Kong) Leung Chi Wing
Head Coach	(Hong Kong) Chu Siu Kei

Last updated: 11 September 2015

== Squad statistics ==
=== Overall Stats ===
	League	Senior Shield	FA Cup	Total Stats
Games played	0	0	0	0
Games won	0	0	0	0
Games drawn	0	0	0	0
Games lost	0	0	0	0
Goals for	0	0	0	0
Goals against	0	0	0	0
Players used	0	0	0	0
Yellow cards	0	0	0	0
Red cards	0	0	0	0

Last updated: 25 July 2015
Source: Player Stats

=== Appearances and goals ===
Key

No. = Squad number

Pos. = Playing position

Nat. = Nationality

Apps = Appearances

GK = Goalkeeper

DF = Defender

MF = Midfielder

FW = Forward

Numbers in parentheses denote appearances as substitute. Players with number struck through and marked † left the club during the playing season.

As of 30 July 2015

No.	Pos.	Nat.	Name	Premier League		Senior Shield		FA Cup		League Cup		Total	
No.	Pos.	Nat.	Name	Apps	Goals	Apps	Goals	Apps	Goals	Apps	Goals	Apps	Goals
1	GK	HKG	Pang Tsz Kin	0	0	0	0	0	0	0	0	0	0
3	DF	HKG	Lo Tsz Hin	0	0	0	0	0	0	0	0	0	0
4	DF	BRA	Clayton Michel Afonso	0	0	0	0	0	0	0	0	0	0
5	DF	ESP	Pablo Gallardo	0	0	0	0	0	0	0	0	0	0
7	MF	HKG	Chu Siu Kei	0	0	0	0	0	0	0	0	0	0
8	MF	HKG	Li Ka Chun	0	0	0	0	0	0	0	0	0	0
9	MF	HKG	Chung Wai Keung	0	0	0	0	0	0	0	0	0	0
10	MF	HKG	Lai Lok Yin	0	0	0	0	0	0	0	0	0	0
11	MF	HKG	Siu Chun Ming	0	0	0	0	0	0	0	0	0	0
12	GK	HKG	Li Yat Chun	0	0	0	0	0	0	0	0	0	0
13	DF	HKG	Siu Pui Lam	0	0	0	0	0	0	0	0	0	0
14	MF	HKG	Lui Wai Chiu	0	0	0	0	0	0	0	0	0	0
17	GK	HKG	To Chun Kiu	0	0	0	0	0	0	0	0	0	0
18	MF	CMR	Eugene Mbome	0	0	0	0	0	0	0	0	0	0
19	MF	HKG	Yiu Ho Ming	0	0	0	0	0	0	0	0	0	0
20	FW	JPN	Kenji Fukuda	0	0	0	0	0	0	0	0	0	0
21	MF	HKG	Lau Ho Lam	0	0	0	0	0	0	0	0	0	0
22	DF	HKG	Vasudeva das Lilley Nunez	0	0	0	0	0	0	0	0	0	0
23	DF	HKG	Leung Kwok Wai	0	0	0	0	0	0	0	0	0	0
24	DF	HKG	Lee Ka Wah	0	0	0	0	0	0	0	0	0	0
27	FW	CMR	Paul Ngue	0	0	0	0	0	0	0	0	0	0
30	MF	HKG	Wong Tsz Ho	0	0	0	0	0	0	0	0	0	0
33	MF	HKG	Chow Win Yin	0	0	0	0	0	0	0	0	0	0
95	MF	HKG	Tse Long Hin	0	0	0	0	0	0	0	0	0	0

=== Top scorers ===
Last updated: 25 July 2015.
Source: Hong Kong Football Association

The list is sorted by shirt number when total goals are equal.

Rnk	Pos	No.	Player	Premier League	Senior Shield	FA Cup	Total
Own goals							
TOTALS							

=== Disciplinary record ===
Includes all competitive matches.Players listed below made at least one appearance for Southern first squad during the season.

N	P	Nat.	Name	League			Shield			FA Cup			Others			Total			Notes
N	P	Nat.	Name	Yellow card	Second yellow card	Red card	Yellow card	Second yellow card	Red card	Yellow card	Second yellow card	Red card	Yellow card	Second yellow card	Red card	Yellow card	Second yellow card	Red card	Notes

Last updated: 25 July 2015
Source: Competitive matches
Ordered by (red card) , (second yellow card) and (yellow card)
(yellow card) = Number of bookings; (second yellow card) = Number of sending offs after a second yellow card; (red card) = Number of sending offs by a direct red card.

=== Substitution Record ===
Includes all competitive matches.

			League		Shield		FA Cup		Others		Total	
No.	Pos	Name	subson	subsoff	subson	subsoff	subson	subsoff	subson	subsoff	subson	subsoff
Goalkeepers
1	GK	Pang Tsz Kin	0	0	0	0	0	0	0	0	0	0
12	GK	Li Yat Chun	0	0	0	0	0	0	0	0	0	0
17	GK	To Chun Kiu	0	0	0	0	0	0	0	0	0	0
Defenders
3	DF	Lo Tsz Hin	0	0	0	0	0	0	0	0	0	0
5	CB	Clayton Michel Afonso	0	0	0	0	0	0	0	0	0	0
6	CB	Pablo Gallardo	0	0	0	0	0	0	0	0	0	0
13	DF	Siu Pui Lam	0	0	0	0	0	0	0	0	0	0
22	DF	Vasudeva das Lilley Nunez	0	0	0	0	0	0	0	0	0	0
23	CB	Leung Kwok Wai	0	0	0	0	0	0	0	0	0	0
24	RB	Lee Ka Wah	0	0	0	0	0	0	0	0	0	0
Midfielders
7	CM	Chu Siu Kei	0	0	0	0	0	0	0	0	0	0
8	CM	Li Ka Chun	0	0	0	0	0	0	0	0	0	0
9	MF	Chung Wai Keung	0	0	0	0	0	0	0	0	0	0
10	AM	Lai Lok Yin	0	0	0	0	0	0	0	0	0	0
11	MF	Siu Chun Ming	0	0	0	0	0	0	0	0	0	0
14	MF	Lui Wai Chiu	0	0	0	0	0	0	0	0	0	0
18	DM	Eugene Mbome	0	0	0	0	0	0	0	0	0	0
19	MF	Yiu Ho Ming	0	0	0	0	0	0	0	0	0	0
21	DM	Lau Ho Lam	0	0	0	0	0	0	0	0	0	0
30	MF	Wong Tsz Ho	0	0	0	0	0	0	0	0	0	0
33	MF	Chow Win Yin	0	0	0	0	0	0	0	0	0	0
21	MF	Tse Long Hin	0	0	0	0	0	0	0	0	0	0
Forwards
20	CF	Kenji Fukuda	0	0	0	0	0	0	0	0	0	0
27	CF	Paul Ngue	0	0	0	0	0	0	0	0	0	0

Last updated: 30 July 2015

=== Captains ===
No.	P	Name	Country	No. games	Notes

Last updated: 25 July 2015
Source: Competitive match reports.
Competitive matches only
Matches started as captain only
Country: FIFA nationality; No.: Squad number; P: Position; Name: Player name; No. Games: Number of games started as captain.

== Competitions ==
=== Overall ===
Competition	Started round	Current position / round	Final position / round	First match	Last match
Hong Kong Premier League	—	4th		12 September 2015	
Senior Shield	—	—			
FA Cup	—	—			

Updated to match played 25 July 2015
Source: Competitions

=== First Division League ===
==== Classification ====
Pos	Team	Pld	W	D	L	GF	GA	GD	Pts	Qualification or relegation
4	Southern	16	6	5	5	26	21	+5	23	Qualification to season play-off (Note: Since the winners of the Senior Shield, Eastern, and the winners of the League Cup, Kitchee, qualified for AFC competitions and the Season Play-off respectively based on league position, the spots awarded to the Senior Shield winner and the League Cup winner for the Season Play-off were awarded to the third and fourth placed team in the league. Pegasus qualified as winners of the FA Cup.)
5	Pegasus	16	4	5	7	22	27	−5	17	Qualification to season play-off
6	Dreams Metro Gallery	16	4	4	8	19	30	−11	16	Relegation to First Division (Note: Both Dreams Metro Gallery and Wong Tai Sin did not apply for the next season's Hong Kong Premier League Licence.)
7	Yuen Long	16	3	6	7	21	32	−11	15	
8	Rangers	16	2	5	9	15	29	−14	11 (Note: Rangers wins head-to-head against Wong Tai Sin.)	

Source: Hong Kong Football Association
Rules for classification: 1) Points; 2) Head-to-head points; 3) Head-to-head goal difference; 4) Head-to-head goals scored; 5) Goal difference; 6) Goals scored; 7) Fair-play points; 8) Drawing lots (Play-off if the winner has to be decided)

==== Results summary ====
Overall								Home						Away					
Pld	W	D	L	GF	GA	GD	Pts	W	D	L	GF	GA	GD	W	D	L	GF	GA	GD
0	0	0	0	0	0	0	0	0	0	0	0	0	0	0	0	0	0	0	0

Last updated: 25 July 2015.
Source: Premier League
