= 42nd Guangdong–Hong Kong Cup =

- Event: Guangdong–Hong Kong Cup
Hong Kong	Guangdong
3	3
- Guangdong won 4–2 on penalties

First leg
Hong Kong	Guangdong
2	0
- Date: 31 January 2024
- Venue: Mong Kok Stadium, Mong Kok, Hong Kong
- Referee: Wong Wai Lun
- Attendance: 5,067

Second leg
Guangdong	Hong Kong
3	1
- Date: 7 February 2024
- Venue: Yuexiushan Stadium, Guangzhou, Guangdong
- Referee: Liang Songshang
- Attendance: 7,288

The 42nd Guangdong–Hong Kong Cup was held on 31 January and 7 February 2024.

== Squads ==
=== Guangdong ===
A 35-man squad for Guangdong was announced on 18 January 2024. On 31 January 2024, Bai Xuesong and Chen Aode were taken out of the squad.

- Head coach: Zhou Sui'an

No.	Pos.	Player	Date of birth (age)	Club
1	GK	Mai Gaoling	12 September 1998 (aged 25)	(Chinese Football Association) Meizhou Hakka
18	GK	Cheng Yuelei	28 October 1987 (aged 36)	(Chinese Football Association) Meizhou Hakka
26	GK	Guo Quanbo	31 August 1997 (aged 26)	(Chinese Football Association) Beijing Guoan
35	GK	Deng Xiongtao	27 August 2002 (aged 21)	(Chinese Football Association) Meizhou Hakka
2	DF	Wang Jianan	31 May 1993 (aged 30)	(Chinese Football Association) Tianjin Jinmen Tiger
3	DF	Yao Xilong	18 August 1997 (aged 26)	(Chinese Football Association) Foshan Nanshi
4	DF	Pan Ximing	11 January 1993 (aged 31)	(Chinese Football Association) Meizhou Hakka
6	DF	Liao Junjian	27 January 1994 (aged 30)	(Chinese Football Association) Meizhou Hakka
15	DF	Chen Zhechao	19 April 1995 (aged 28)	(Chinese Football Association) Meizhou Hakka
25	DF	Yang Pengju	6 June 2000 (aged 23)	(Chinese Football Association) Dalian Pro
28	DF	Tian Ziyi	27 January 2001 (aged 23)	(Chinese Football Association) Shenzhen
31	DF	Rao Weihui	25 March 1989 (aged 34)	(Chinese Football Association) Meizhou Hakka
32	DF	Huang Jiaqiang	14 March 1990 (aged 33)	(Chinese Football Association) Qingdao West Coast
36	DF	Zhang Sijie	15 January 2001 (aged 23)	(Chinese Football Association) Meizhou Hakka
7	MF	Ye Chugui	8 September 1994 (aged 29)	(Chinese Football Association) Meizhou Hakka
8	MF	Liang Xueming	2 August 1995 (aged 28)	(Chinese Football Association) Guangzhou E-Power
10	MF	Yin Hongbo	30 October 1989 (aged 34)	(Chinese Football Association) Meizhou Hakka
11	MF	Zhang Dachi	17 June 2002 (aged 21)	(Chinese Football Association) Guangzhou
13	MF	Shi Liang	11 May 1989 (aged 34)	(Chinese Football Association) Meizhou Hakka
16	MF	Yang Chaosheng	22 July 1993 (aged 30)	(Chinese Football Association) Meizhou Hakka
17	MF	Yang Yihu	16 September 1991 (aged 32)	(Chinese Football Association) Meizhou Hakka
19	MF	Yang Yilin	23 February 1999 (aged 24)	(Chinese Football Association) Meizhou Hakka
20	MF	Guo Yi	29 January 1993 (aged 31)	(Chinese Football Association) Meizhou Hakka
21	MF	Wang Peng	16 November 1997 (aged 26)	(Chinese Football Association) Guangzhou E-Power
22	MF	Li Ning	20 October 2001 (aged 22)	(Chinese Football Association) Shenzhen
23	MF	Cui Wei	16 August 1994 (aged 29)	(Chinese Football Association) Meizhou Hakka
27	MF	Chen Rong	26 January 2001 (aged 23)	(Chinese Football Association) Dalian Pro
30	MF	Chen Jie	15 October 1989 (aged 34)	(Chinese Football Association) Meizhou Hakka
37	MF	Chen Guokang	23 January 1999 (aged 25)	(Chinese Football Association) Meizhou Hakka
38	MF	Li Yongjia	24 July 2001 (aged 22)	(Chinese Football Association) Meizhou Hakka
9	FW	Xie Weijun	14 November 1997 (aged 26)	(Chinese Football Association) Tianjin Jinmen Tiger
12	FW	Yin Congyao	4 March 1997 (aged 26)	(Chinese Football Association) Meizhou Hakka
29	FW	Xiao Zhi	28 May 1985 (aged 38)	(Chinese Football Association) Guangzhou E-Power

=== Hong Kong ===
==== First leg squad ====
The 22-man squad of Hong Kong for the first leg was announced on 29 January 2024.

- Head coach: Jørn Andersen

No.	Pos.	Player	Date of birth (age)	Club
1	GK	Michael Wan	23 June 2001 (aged 22)	(Football Association of Hong Kong, China) HK U23
18	GK	Tse Ka Wing	4 September 1999 (aged 24)	(Football Association of Hong Kong, China) Tai Po
19	GK	Pong Cheuk Hei	31 January 2004 (aged 20)	(Football Association of Hong Kong, China) Resources Capital
2	DF	Yip Cheuk Man	12 October 2001 (aged 22)	(Football Association of Hong Kong, China) North District
3	DF	Wong Tsz Ho	7 March 1994 (aged 29)	(Football Association of Hong Kong, China) Eastern
4	DF	Leon Jones	28 February 1998 (aged 25)	(Football Association of Hong Kong, China) Eastern
13	DF	Li Ngai Hoi	15 October 1994 (aged 29)	(Football Association of Hong Kong, China) Lee Man
15	DF	Tsang Yi Hang	27 October 2003 (aged 20)	(The Football Association) United of Manchester
20	DF	Timothy Chow	11 March 2006 (aged 17)	(Football Association of Hong Kong, China) HKFC
6	MF	Lam Hin Ting	9 December 1999 (aged 24)	(Football Association of Hong Kong, China) Rangers
7	MF	Ma Hei Wai	3 February 2004 (aged 19)	(Football Association of Hong Kong, China) Eastern
8	MF	Cheng Chun Wang	11 February 2001 (aged 22)	(Football Association of Hong Kong, China) HK U23
9	MF	Chang Hei Yin	6 April 2000 (aged 23)	(Football Association of Hong Kong, China) Lee Man
16	MF	Chan Siu Kwan	1 August 1992 (aged 31)	(Football Association of Hong Kong, China) Tai Po
22	MF	Yu Joy Yin	8 October 2001 (aged 22)	(Football Association of Hong Kong, China) Eastern
10	FW	Jordan Lam	2 January 1999 (aged 25)	(Football Association of Hong Kong, China) North District
11	FW	Wong Ho Chun	2 April 2002 (aged 21)	(Football Association of Hong Kong, China) Eastern
12	FW	Matthew Slattery	5 April 2005 (aged 18)	(Football Association of Hong Kong, China) Kitchee
14	FW	Poon Pui Hin	3 October 2000 (aged 23)	(Football Association of Hong Kong, China) Kitchee
17	FW	Jahangir Khan	3 October 2000 (aged 23)	(Football Association of Hong Kong, China) HKFC
21	FW	Ng Yu Hei	13 February 2006 (aged 17)	(Football Association of Hong Kong, China) Eastern
23	FW	Sun Ming Him	19 June 2000 (aged 23)	(Football Association of Hong Kong, China) Eastern

==== Second leg squad ====
The 23-man squad of Hong Kong for the second leg was announced on 3 February 2024.

- Head coach: Jørn Andersen

No.	Pos.	Player	Date of birth (age)	Club
	GK	Michael Wan	23 June 2001 (age 24)	(Football Association of Hong Kong, China) HK U23
	GK	Tse Ka Wing	4 September 1999 (aged 24)	(Football Association of Hong Kong, China) Tai Po
	GK	Pong Cheuk Hei	31 January 2004 (aged 20)	(Football Association of Hong Kong, China) Resources Capital
	DF	Yip Cheuk Man	12 October 2001 (aged 22)	(Football Association of Hong Kong, China) North District
	DF	Leon Jones	28 February 1998 (aged 25)	(Football Association of Hong Kong, China) Eastern
	DF	Li Ngai Hoi	15 October 1994 (aged 29)	(Football Association of Hong Kong, China) Lee Man
	DF	Tsang Yi Hang	27 October 2003 (aged 20)	(The Football Association) United of Manchester
	DF	Timothy Chow	11 March 2006 (aged 17)	(Football Association of Hong Kong, China) HKFC
	DF	Chan Hoi Pak	29 January 1999 (aged 25)	(Football Association of Hong Kong, China) Southern
	MF	Lam Hin Ting	9 December 1999 (aged 24)	(Football Association of Hong Kong, China) Rangers
	MF	Ma Hei Wai	3 February 2004 (aged 20)	(Football Association of Hong Kong, China) Eastern
	MF	Cheng Chun Wang	11 February 2001 (aged 22)	(Football Association of Hong Kong, China) HK U23
	MF	Chang Hei Yin	6 April 2000 (aged 23)	(Football Association of Hong Kong, China) Lee Man
	MF	Chan Siu Kwan	1 August 1992 (aged 31)	(Football Association of Hong Kong, China) Tai Po
	MF	Cheng Chin Lung	7 January 1998 (aged 26)	(Football Association of Hong Kong, China) Kitchee
	MF	Sohgo Ichikawa	30 July 2004 (aged 19)	(Football Association of Hong Kong, China) Southern
	FW	Jordan Lam	2 January 1999 (aged 25)	(Football Association of Hong Kong, China) North District
	FW	Wong Ho Chun	2 April 2002 (aged 21)	(Football Association of Hong Kong, China) Eastern
	FW	Matthew Slattery	5 April 2005 (aged 18)	(Football Association of Hong Kong, China) Kitchee
	FW	Poon Pui Hin	3 October 2000 (aged 23)	(Football Association of Hong Kong, China) Kitchee
	FW	Ng Yu Hei	13 February 2006 (aged 17)	(Football Association of Hong Kong, China) Eastern
	FW	Lau Chi Lok	15 October 1993 (aged 30)	(Football Association of Hong Kong, China) Rangers
	FW	Mahama Awal	10 June 1991 (aged 32)	(Football Association of Hong Kong, China) Southern

== Match details ==
=== First leg ===
31 January 2024
20:00 UTC+8

Hong Kong	2–0	Guangdong
Chan Siu Kwan 11'; Poon Pui Hin 52'	Report

Mong Kok Stadium, Mong Kok, Hong Kong
Attendance: 5,067
Referee: Wong Wai Lun (Hong Kong)

=== Second leg ===
7 February 2024
19:30 UTC+8

Guangdong	3–1 (a.e.t.)	Hong Kong
Xiao Zhi 7'; Chen Zhechao 40'; Liao Junjian 66'	Report	Awal 25'
Penalties
Wang Shijie (penalty scored); Yin Congyao (penalty scored); Rao Weihui (penalty scored); Liao Junjian (penalty scored)	4–2	(penalty missed) Chan Hoi Pak; (penalty scored) Ng Yu Hei; (penalty missed) Yip Cheuk Man; (penalty scored) Ma Hei Wai

Yuexiushan Stadium, Guangzhou, Guangdong
Attendance: 7,288
Referee: Liang Songshang (China PR)
