= 39th Guangdong–Hong Kong Cup =

- Event: Guangdong–Hong Kong Cup
Guangdong	Hong Kong
4	3

First leg
Guangdong	Hong Kong
3	2
- Date: 1 January 2017
- Venue: Guangdong Provincial People's Stadium, Guangzhou, Guangdong
- Referee: Wang Di

Second leg
Hong Kong	Guangdong
1	1
- Date: 4 January 2017
- Venue: Hong Kong Stadium, So Kon Po, Hong Kong
- Referee: Lau Fong Hei
- Attendance: 4,272

The 39th Guangdong–Hong Kong Cup was held on 1 January and 4 January 2017. Guangdong won their 24th title after winning 4–3 on aggregate.

== Squads ==
=== Guangdong ===
- Head Coach: (China) Chen Yuliang

No.	Pos.	Player	Date of birth (age)	Caps	Club
2	DF	Lin Juyuan	18 March 1993 (aged 23)		(China) Meizhou Hakka
3	FW	Xiao Zhi	28 May 1985 (aged 31)		(China) Guangzhou R&F
4	DF	Guo Zichao	25 January 1989 (aged 27)		(China) Jiangxi Liansheng
6	MF	Shi Hongjun	4 October 1991 (aged 25)		(China) Meizhou Hakka
10	FW	Liang Xueming	2 August 1995 (aged 21)		(China) Guangzhou Evergrande
11	MF	Zeng Chao	23 January 1993 (aged 23)		(China) Guangzhou R&F
12	DF	Huang Jiaqiang	14 March 1990 (aged 26)		(China) Jiangxi Liansheng
16	DF	Liao Junjian	27 January 1994 (aged 22)		Hebei China Fortune
17	MF	Yu Jianfeng	29 January 1989 (aged 27)		(China) Meizhou Hakka
19	MF	Chang Feiya	3 February 1993 (aged 23)		(China) Guangzhou R&F
20	GK	Pan Weiming	27 December 1978 (aged 38)		(China) Shanghai Shenhua staff
22	MF	Shen Feng	16 September 1993 (aged 23)		(China) Yanbian Funde
23	MF	Lu Lin	3 February 1985 (aged 31)		(China) Guangzhou R&F
29	DF	Tang Dechao	9 February 1985 (aged 31)		(China) Meizhou Hakka
30	GK	Luo Zuqing	27 April 1993 (aged 23)		(China) Meizhou Hakka
32	MF	Chen Zhizhao	14 March 1988 (aged 28)		(China) Guangzhou R&F
33	MF	Wang Song	12 October 1983 (aged 33)		(China) Guangzhou R&F
34	MF	Hu Weiwei	3 March 1993 (aged 22)		(China) Qingdao Jonoon
36	MF	Huang Zhengyu	24 January 1997 (aged 19)		(China) Guangzhou R&F
37	MF	Li Zhilang	22 August 1991 (aged 25)		(China) Meizhou Hakka
39	MF	Zhong Juzhan	29 April 1993 (aged 23)		Hebei China Fortune
55	DF	Tu Dongxu	13 November 1991 (aged 25)		(China) Guangzhou R&F

=== Hong Kong ===
The final 20-man squad of Hong Kong was announced on 28 December 2016.

- Head Coach: (Hong Kong) Liu Chun Fai

No.	Pos.	Player	Date of birth (age)	Caps	Club
1	GK	Tsang Man Fai	2 August 1991 (aged 25)		(Hong Kong) South China
2	DF	Wong Chun Ho	31 May 1990 (aged 26)		Hong Kong Pegasus
3	DF	Chan Hin Kwong	27 February 1988 (aged 28)		(Hong Kong) KMB Yuen Long
4	DF	Li Ngai Hoi	15 October 1994 (aged 22)		(Hong Kong) Kitchee
5	DF	Cheung Chi Yung	10 June 1989 (aged 27)		Hong Kong Pegasus
6	MF	Lau Ho Lam	22 January 1993 (aged 23)		(Hong Kong) KMB Yuen Long
7	FW	Hui Ka Lok	5 January 1994 (aged 22)		(Hong Kong) Lee Man Rangers
8	MF	Tam Lok Hin	12 January 1991 (aged 25)		(Hong Kong) KMB Yuen Long
10	FW	Lam Hok Hei	18 September 1991 (aged 25)		(Hong Kong) South China
11	DF	Wong Tsz Ho	7 March 1994 (aged 22)		(Hong Kong) Lee Man Rangers
12	MF	Ngan Lok Fung	26 January 1993 (aged 23)		(Hong Kong) KMB Yuen Long
13	DF	Fong Pak Lun	14 April 1993 (aged 23)		Hong Kong Pegasus
14	DF	Chan Kong Pan	13 April 1996 (aged 20)		(Hong Kong) Kwoon Chung Southern
15	DF	Yeung Chi Lun	20 November 1989 (aged 27)		(Hong Kong) Biu Chun Glory Sky
16	MF	Tan Chun Lok	5 January 1996 (aged 20)		(Hong Kong) Wofoo Tai Po
17	MF	Lai Lok Yin	20 July 1995 (aged 21)		Hong Kong Pegasus
18	GK	Yuen Ho Chun	19 July 1995 (aged 21)		Hong Kong Pegasus
19	GK	Pang Tsz Kin	16 December 1986 (aged 30)		(Hong Kong) KMB Yuen Long
20	DF	Wu Chun Ming	21 November 1997 (aged 19)		Hong Kong Pegasus
21	DF	Tse Long Hin	6 February 1995 (aged 21)		(Hong Kong) Lee Man Rangers

== Match details ==
=== First leg ===
1 January 2017
15:30 UTC+8

Guangdong	3–2	Hong Kong
Liao Junjian 16'; Zeng Chao 29'; Liang Xueming 80'; Yu Jianfeng (yellow card) 90+3'	Report	Tan Chun Lok 24'; Li Ngai Hoi (yellow card) 63'; Lai Lok Yin 66'; Wong Tsz Ho (yellow card) 90+1'

Guangdong Provincial People's Stadium, Guangzhou, Guangdong
Referee: Wang Di (China PR)

=== Second leg ===
4 January 2017
20:00 UTC+8

Hong Kong	1–1	Guangdong
Wong Tsz Ho 21'; Li Ngai Hoi (yellow card) 73'; Ngan Lok Fung (yellow card) 77'	Report	Wang Song 66'; Chen Zhizhao (yellow card) 67'; Liao Junjian (yellow card) 73'

Hong Kong Stadium, So Kon Po, Hong Kong
Attendance: 4,272
Referee: Lau Fong Hei (Hong Kong)

Guangdong won 4–3 on aggregate.
