= Leon Jones =

Hong Kong footballer

Personal information
- Date of birth: 28 February 1998 (age 28)
- Place of birth: Glasgow, Scotland
- Height: 1.80 m (5 ft 11 in)
- Position: Centre back

Youth career
- 2008–2017: Heart of Midlothian

College career
Years	Team	Apps	(Gls)
2017–2021	Kentucky Wildcats	57	(2)

Senior career*
Years	Team	Apps	(Gls)
2019	Chicago FC United	9	(0)
2021–2022	Dunfermline Athletic	2	(0)
2022–2024	Eastern	24	(1)
2024–2025	Kitchee	21	(0)
2025–2026	Eastern District	8	(0)

International career^{‡}
2013	Scotland U15	4	(0)
2013	Scotland U16	8	(0)
2024–	Hong Kong	20	(1)
- * Club domestic league appearances and goals as of 16 May 2026 ‡ National team caps and goals as of 18 November 2025

Leon Jones (Chinese: 鐘樂安; born 28 February 1998) is a professional footballer who plays as a defender. Born in Scotland, he plays for the Hong Kong national team.

== Early career ==
Jones is a youth product of Scottish Premiership club Heart of Midlothian.

== Collegiate career ==
Ahead of the fall 2017 semester, Jones joined the University of Kentucky men's soccer team, the Kentucky Wildcats, on a 4-year scholarship to play college soccer. Given the number 5 jersey, Jones found himself a consistent starter during his first season, uncommon for a freshman. On 21 October 2017, he scored his first goal in a 3–2 loss to Lipscomb. He started and appeared in 17 matches. Although the Wildcats were eliminated in the first round of the 2017 Conference USA Men's Soccer Tournament, Jones was named Conference USA All-Freshman Team and Third Team.

Jones' sophomore season coincided with the program's most successful season in history. In addition to winning the 2018 Conference USA Regular Season Championship, the 2018 Conference USA Men's Soccer Tournament and reaching the Elite Eight of the 2018 NCAA Division I Men's Soccer Tournament, Jones was named to the Third Team All-CUSA. He started all 22 matches, led the team in minutes played (2,006 mins), recorded 3 assists and contributed to all 14 clean sheets held by the Wildcat defence, an NCAA 2018 season record.

Coming into his third season with the Wildcats, Jones suffered an injury and was forced to redshirt his junior year. Despite this, he was named to the C-USA Commissioner's Honor Roll, Fall SEC Academic Honor Roll and was inducted into the Frank G. Ham Society of Character.

Jones was named team captain the following season and made his return to the lineup in a 1–0 loss against Notre Dame. On 10 April 2021, he scored an equalizing goal in the 87th minute of a 2–1 win over Old Dominion. Jones earned All-C-USA first-team honours at the culmination of the regular season. Despite having remaining eligibility, Jones departed following the end of the season and ended his collegiate career with 57 appearances and 2 goals.

Between his sophomore and junior seasons, Jones played one season in the USL League Two. During the 2019 USL League Two season, he played with Chicago FC United, where he was named captain and won the 2019 Great Lakes Division title. Jones would go on to be named as one of the Top 10 players from the United Kingdom and made the All-Central Conference Team.

== Club career ==
=== Dunfermline Athletic ===
In August 2021, Jones joined Scottish Championship club Dunfermline Athletic.

=== Eastern ===
On 19 December 2022, Jones joined Hong Kong Premier League club Eastern. He instantly made an impact in Eastern's defence and was highly rated by the local media. He played 8 times for his new club and scored once in his first HKPL season. As a result of his impressive performances Jones was named in various Hong Kong squads in the lead up to the 2023 AFC Asia Cup, however he was unable to attend any squads due to an ongoing injury. His appearances in his first season was limited due to injuries.

On 16 March 2024, Jones received his first Player of the Match award against title rivals Lee Man. During his second season, Jones continued to play an important role helping his club finish 3rd in the HKPL, reach the Hong Kong Senior Shield final for a second successive season, win the FA Cup and thus qualify for the 2024/2025 Asian Champions League 2 group stage. This would turn out to be Jones' final season with Eastern. He ended his time with the club with 24 appearances, 2 goals and 1 assist.

=== Kitchee ===
On 27 June 2024, Kitchee president Ken Ng announced that the club had signed Jones.

On 2 July 2024, Jones officially joined Kitchee.

=== Eastern District ===
On 29 August 2025, Jones was revealed as a new signing for newly promoted club Eastern District.

== International career ==
Jones represented Scotland up to under-17 level. Born by a Scottish father and a Hong Kong mother, he is also eligible to represent both Hong Kong and China.

On 20 March 2013, Jones was named captain and made his international youth debut in a 2–0 loss to Germany U-15 at a U15 International Tournament held in Bruno de Marchi, Italy. Jones was selected as part of the 2013 Sky Sports Victory Shield Scotland Squad, alongside fellow Hearts teammate Sean McKirdy. He would go to captain the side to victory in the tournament with a 1–0 win over England U-16 on 29 November 2013, becoming the first to do so since 1998. During his international youth career, Jones would represent and captain the under-15, under-16 and under-17 national sides, amassing 12 youth caps.

On 22 February 2023, it was reported that Jones had already received his HKSAR passport, making him eligible to represent Hong Kong internationally.

Jones represented Hong Kong in the 42nd Guangdong–Hong Kong Cup, starting and playing all minutes in the 1st and 2nd legs, as his team lost 4–2 on penalties after an aggregate scoreline of 3–3, which included an impressive 2–0 home win at Mong Kok Stadium.

On 6 June 2024, Jones made his international debut for Hong Kong in a 2022 FIFA World Cup qualifier against Iran. He started the game and played 72 minutes as Iran won 4–2. On 19 March 2025, he scored his first international goal in a friendly match against Macau.

== Career statistics ==
=== International ===
As of 18 November 2025

National team	Year	Apps	Goals
Hong Kong	2024	8	0
Hong Kong	2025	12	1
Total		20	1

=== International goals ===
No.	Date	Venue	Opponent	Score	Result	Competition
1.	19 March 2025	Mong Kok Stadium, Mong Kok, Hong Kong	Macau	1–0	2–0	Friendly

== Honours ==
=== Club ===
Kentucky Wildcats

- Conference USA (Regular Season): 2018
- Conference USA Men's Soccer Tournament: 2018

Chicago FC United

- Great Lakes Division: 2019

Eastern

- Hong Kong FA Cup: 2023–24

=== International ===
Scotland U-16

- Sky Sports Victory Shield: 2013

=== Individual ===
- Conference USA All-Freshman Team: 2017
- Third Team All-CUSA: 2017, 2018
- First Team All-CUSA: 2021
