= Chen Zhechao =

Chinese footballer (born 1995)

Chen Zhechao 陈哲超
Personal information
- Date of birth: 19 April 1995 (age 31)
- Place of birth: Wuhan, Hubei, China
- Height: 1.77 m (5 ft 10 in)
- Positions: Left-back; midfielder

Team information
- Current team: Wuhan Three Towns
- Number: 15

Youth career
- Shandong Luneng
- 2011–2014: → Real SC (loan)

Senior career*
Years	Team	Apps	(Gls)
2014–2015	Sacavenense	13	(0)
2015	Torreense	3	(0)
2016–2021	Shandong Luneng	16	(0)
2020	→ Guangzhou R&F (loan)	15	(0)
2022–2024	Meizhou Hakka	71	(2)
2025–	Wuhan Three Towns	46	(1)

International career^{‡}
2013–2014	China U-19	12	(1)
2015–2018	China U-23	24	(1)
- * Club domestic league appearances and goals as of 22 November 2026 ‡ National team caps and goals as of 19 August 2018

Chen Zhechao (Chinese: 陈哲超; born 19 April 1995) is a Chinese footballer who currently plays for Chinese Super League side Wuhan Three Towns.

== Club career ==
Chen Zhechao was promoted to Shandong Luneng's first team squad in 2016 after five years study in Portugal. On 15 April 2016, he made his debut for Shandong Luneng in the 2016 Chinese Super League against Yanbian FC, coming on as a substitute for Zhang Chi in the 63rd minute. He would play understudy to Zheng Zheng and Song Long for the left back position until on 21 January 2020 he was loaned out to fellow top tier club Guangzhou R&F to gain more playing time. He would make his debut for Guangzhou R&F in a league game on 26 July 2020, against Shenzhen F.C. in a 3-0 defeat.

Upon his return to Shandong, Chen would still struggle to establish himself as a regular within the team and despite being part of the squad that won the 2021 Chinese Super League title, on 22 March 2022, Chen transferred to Chinese Super League club Meizhou Hakka. He would go on to make his debut in a league game on 4 June 2022 against Tianjin Jinmen Tiger in a 1-1 draw.

On 27 January 2025, Chen signed Chinese Super League club Wuhan Three Towns.

== Career statistics ==
Statistics accurate as of match played 31 December 2023.

Appearances and goals by club, season and competition
Club	Season	League			National Cup		Continental		Other		Total	
Club	Season	Division	Apps	Goals	Apps	Goals	Apps	Goals	Apps	Goals	Apps	Goals
Sacavenense	2014–15	Campeonato de Portugal	13	0	0	0	-		-		13	0
Torreense	2015–16	Campeonato de Portugal	3	0	0	0	-		-		3	0
Shandong Luneng	2016	Chinese Super League	3	0	0	0	1	0	-		4	0
Shandong Luneng	2017	Chinese Super League	0	0	1	0	-		-		1	0
Shandong Luneng	2018	Chinese Super League	9	0	1	0	-		-		10	0
Shandong Luneng	2019	Chinese Super League	2	0	0	0	-		-		2	0
Shandong Luneng	2021	Chinese Super League	2	0	4	0	-		-		6	0
Shandong Luneng	Total		16	0	6	0	1	0	0	0	23	0
Guangzhou R&F (loan)	2020	Chinese Super League	15	0	0	0	-		-		15	0
Meizhou Hakka	2022	Chinese Super League	20	0	1	0	-		-		21	0
Meizhou Hakka	2023	Chinese Super League	24	2	1	0	-		-		25	0
Meizhou Hakka	Total		44	2	2	0	1	0	0	0	46	2
Career total			91	2	8	0	1	0	0	0	100	2

== Honours ==
=== Club ===
Shandong Taishan

- Chinese Super League: 2021
- Chinese FA Cup: 2021
