= Siu Chun Ming =

Hong Kong footballer

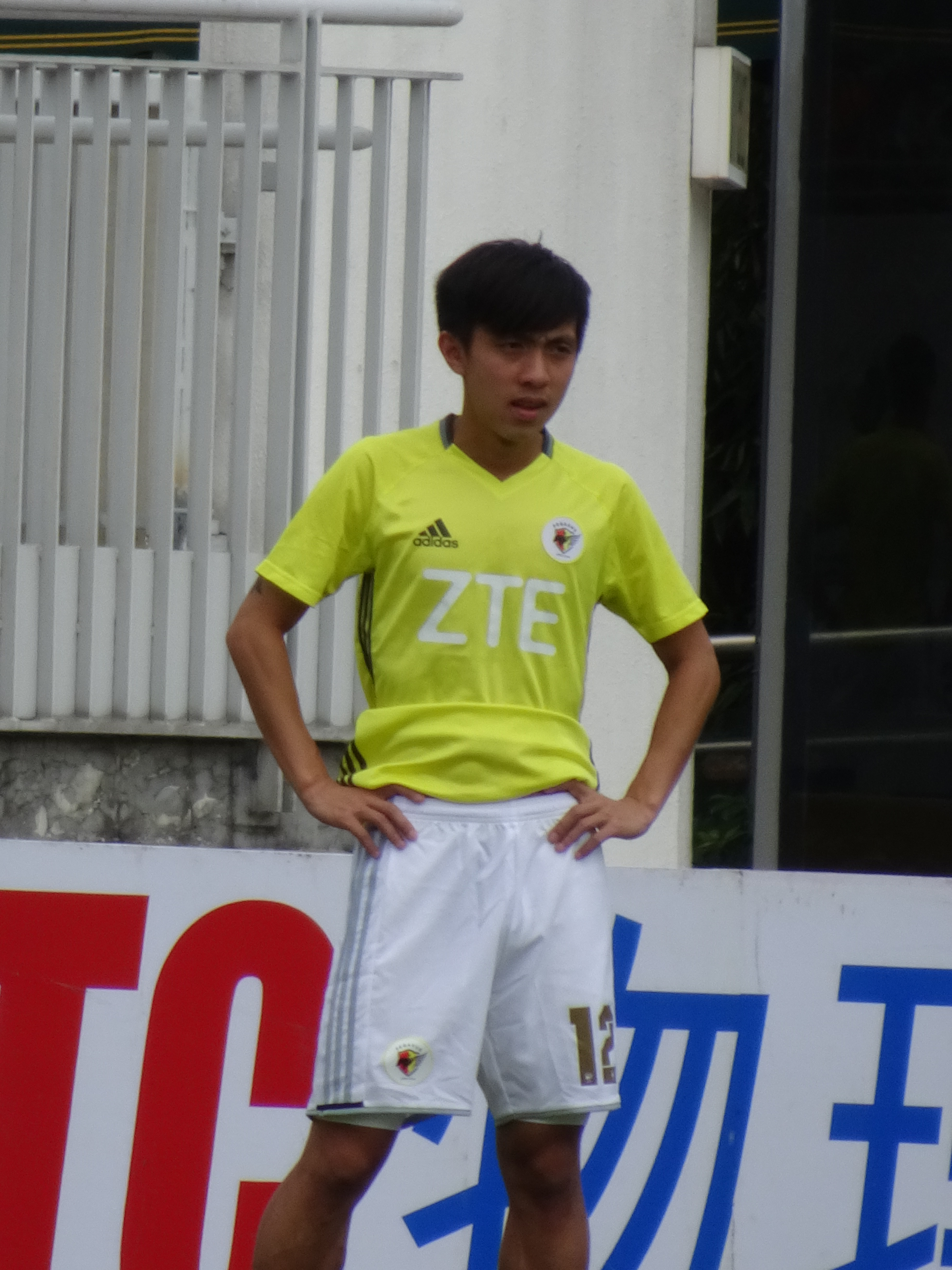

Personal information
- Full name: Siu Chun Ming
- Date of birth: 27 December 1995 (age 30)
- Place of birth: Hong Kong
- Height: 1.70 m (5 ft 7 in)
- Position: Attacking midfielder

Senior career*
Years	Team	Apps	(Gls)
2013	Sham Shui Po	10	(4)
2014	South China	0	(0)
2014–2015	Sun Source	26	(9)
2015–2016	Dreams Metro Gallery	9	(0)
2016–2020	Pegasus	26	(0)
2020–2022	Dreams Metro Gallery	24	(4)
2022–2023	North District	24	(1)
2023–2026	3 Sing	51	(6)
2026–	Spiny Rayed		
- * Club domestic league appearances and goals

Siu Chun Ming (Chinese: 蕭俊銘; born 27 December 1995) is a former Hong Kong professional footballer who played as an attacking midfielder.

== Club career ==
In the 2014–15 season, Siu scored 9 goals.

In 2015, Siu joined Dreams Metro Gallery.

On 12 July 2016, Siu was introduced as a Pegasus player during the club's season opening training session.
