= Li Yongjia =

Chinese footballer (born 2001)

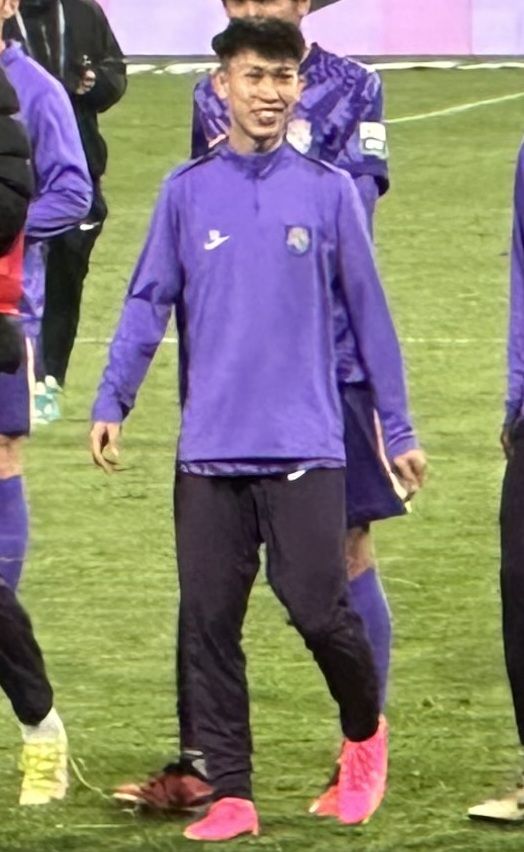
- Li Yongjia in April 2025

Personal information
- Full name: Li Yongjia
- Date of birth: 24 July 2001 (age 25)
- Place of birth: Sanshui, Guangdong, China
- Height: 1.73 m (5 ft 8 in)
- Position: Midfielder

Team information
- Current team: Tianjin Jinmen Tiger
- Number: 22

Youth career
- 2019–2022: Guangzhou City

Senior career*
Years	Team	Apps	(Gls)
2022	Guangzhou City	27	(1)
2023–2024	Meizhou Hakka	28	(1)
2025–	Tianjin Jinmen Tiger	15	(0)

International career^{‡}
2023	China U23	3	(0)
- * Club domestic league appearances and goals as of 22 November 2026 ‡ National team caps and goals as of 22 November 2025

Li Yongjia (Chinese: 李永佳; pinyin: Lǐ Yǒngjiā; born 24 July 2001) is a Chinese professional footballer who plays as a midfielder for Chinese Super League club Tianjin Jinmen Tiger.

== Early life ==
Born in Sanshui, Guangdong, Li Yongjia was identified as having better promise in football than his peers at a young age. In his primary school years, he led his school, Xinan Central Primary School, to clinch first-place in a district-wide primary school football competition. In 2013, to pursue a future career in football, he joined the Sanshui Sports School, then the Foshan Sports School shortly after. In 2016, he joined the Guangdong Youth Football Team, and took his team to a second-place finish in the 2018 National Youth Super League at the under-17 level. In 2019, Li Yongjia joined the youth academy of Chinese Super League club Guangzhou R&F.

== Club career ==
=== Guangzhou City ===
On 17 May 2022, it was announced that Li Yongjia was promoted to Guangzhou City's first-team squad for the upcoming 2022 Chinese Super League season, fielding the number 38 shirt. He made his senior and professional debut on 15 June 2022, coming on as a 79-minute substitute for Zhang Gong in a league game against Henan Songshan Longmen, which ended in a 3–0 defeat for Guangzhou City. He then gained consistent playing time under then-Guangzhou City head coach Li Weifeng, and scored his first senior goal on 13 September 2022 with a curler in a 1–0 Guangzhou derby victory against Guangzhou FC, becoming the first ever CSL goalscorer from Sanshui.

=== Meizhou Hakka ===
Following Guangzhou City's financial difficulties and their subsequent dissolution, on 9 March 2023, Li Yongjia signed for Chinese Super League side Meizhou Hakka, where he would continue wearing the number 38. He made his debut for Meizhou Hakka on 15 April 2023, on the opening game of the 2023 league season away against Beijing Guoan, which ended in a 1–1 draw. He scored his first goal for Meizhou Hakka on 9 June 2023, as a substitute in a 3–2 home loss against Cangzhou Mighty Lions.

=== Tianjin Jinmen Tiger ===
On 24 January 2025, Li Yongjia joined Chinese Super League club Tianjin Jinmen Tiger.

== International career ==
On 12 September 2023, Li Yongjia was selected as part of the 22-man squad that would compete for China at the 2022 Asian Games.

== Career statistics ==
=== Club ===
As of 1 November 2025

Appearances and goals by club, season, and competition
Club	Season	League			Cup		Continental		Other		Total	
Club	Season	Division	Apps	Goals	Apps	Goals	Apps	Goals	Apps	Goals	Apps	Goals
Guangzhou City	2022	Chinese Super League	27	1	0	0	–		–		27	1
Meizhou Hakka	2023	Chinese Super League	15	1	2	0	–		–		17	1
Meizhou Hakka	2024	Chinese Super League	13	0	1	0	–		–		14	0
Meizhou Hakka	Total		28	1	3	0	0	0	0	0	31	1
Tianjin Jinmen Tiger	2025	Chinese Super League	13	0	2	0	–		–		15	1
Career total			68	2	5	0	0	0	0	0	73	2
