= Lau Wing Sang =

Footballer from Hong Kong

Personal information
- Full name: Rinson Lau Wing Sang
- Date of birth: 15 September 1999 (age 27)
- Place of birth: Hong Kong
- Height: 1.74 m (5 ft 9 in)
- Position: Defender

Senior career*
Years	Team	Apps	(Gls)
2017–2019	Hoi King	10	(0)
2019–2020	Southern	0	(0)
2020–2021	Lee Man	0	(0)
2024–	Hoi King	48	(1)
- * Club domestic league appearances and goals as of 16 May 2026

Rinson Lau Wing Sang (Chinese: 劉穎笙; born 15 September 1999 in Hong Kong) is a former Hong Kong professional footballer who played as a defender.

== Club career ==
In 2018, Lau started his senior career with Hong Kong Premier League club Hoi King, where he made 10 league appearances.

In the 2019–20 season, he joined Southern.

On 19 October 2020, it was announced that Lau had signed for Lee Man.
