= To Chun Kiu =

Hong Kong footballer (born 1994)

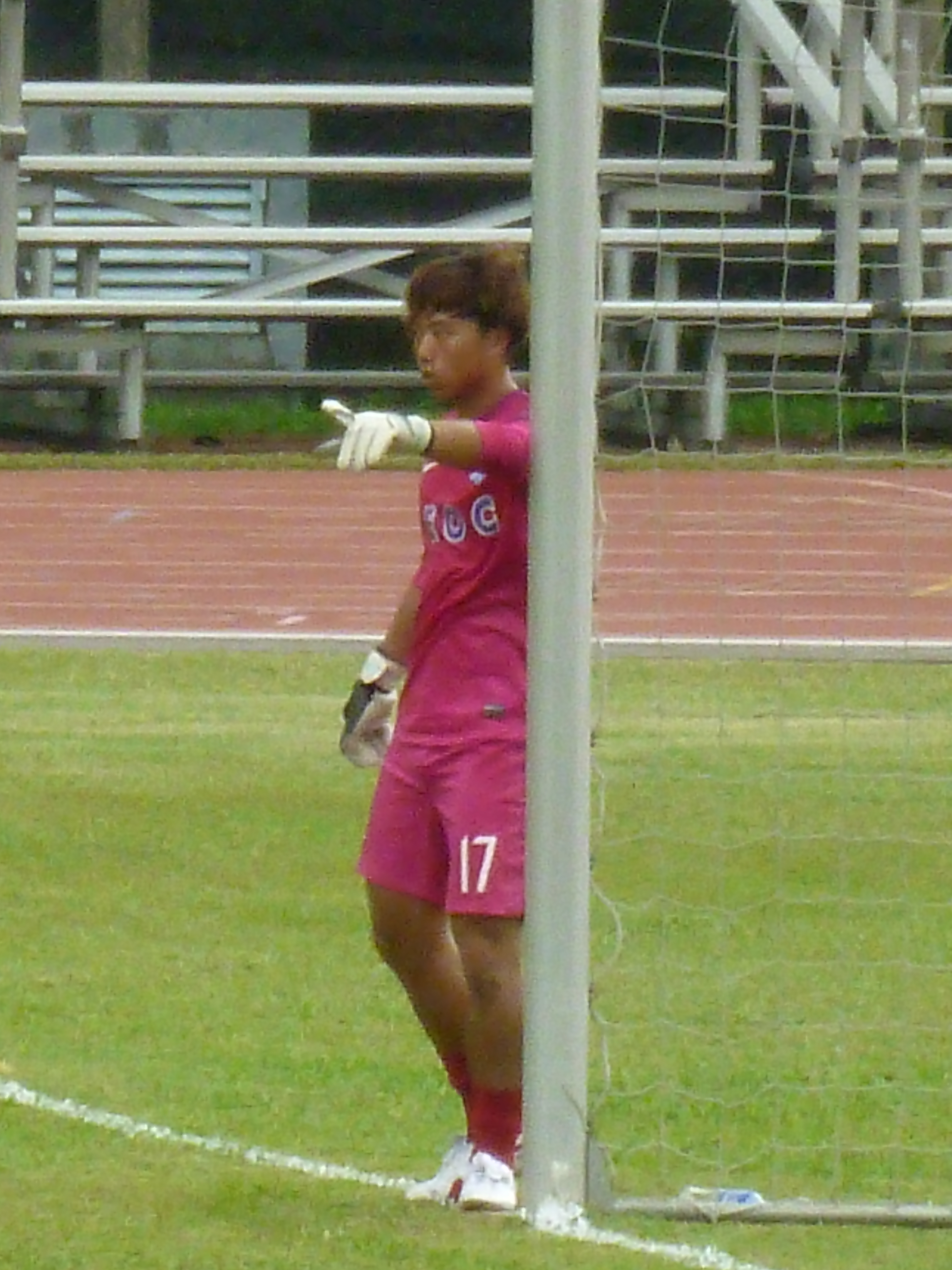

Personal information
- Full name: To Chun Kiu
- Date of birth: 17 July 1994 (age 32)
- Place of birth: Hong Kong
- Height: 1.80 m (5 ft 11 in)
- Position: Goalkeeper

Youth career
- 2008–2009: Kitchee
- 2009–2010: Tai Po
- 2010–2011: Kitchee

Senior career*
Years	Team	Apps	(Gls)
2011–2012	Sham Shui Po	0	(0)
2012–2016	Metro Gallery	3	(0)
2016–2017	Pegasus	1	(0)
2017–2019	Dreams	16	(0)
2019–2021	Happy Valley	23	(0)
2021–2022	HKFC	1	(0)
2022	Sham Shui Po	4	(0)
2023	Suzuka Point Getters	0	(0)
2025	Eastern District	12	(0)

International career^{‡}
2010–2011	Hong Kong U-18	1	(0)
2012–2014	Hong Kong U-20	3	(0)
- * Club domestic league appearances and goals as of 18 May 2025 ‡ National team caps and goals as of 6 January 2023

To Chun Kiu (Chinese: 屠俊翹; born 17 July 1994) is a former Hong Kong professional footballer who played as a goalkeeper.

== Youth career ==
To was determined to be a goalkeeper since childhood and joined the Kitchee academy when he was 14. He began his high school career at Yan Chai Hospital Tung Chi Ying Memorial Secondary School until the 2011–12 season, when he transferred to Beacon College where he was a regular in goal. In the quarterfinals that season, he made two crucial saves in the penalty shootout win over perennial powerhouses La Salle College. Beacon College went on to win the 2011–12 Hong Kong Inter-School Football Competition.

== Club career ==
In 2011, To trained with Sham Shui Po who were in the Hong Kong First Division at the time.

He signed with Metro Gallery in July 2012 and spent four seasons with the club. He made his professional debut on 23 October 2012 in a 3–0 loss to Citizen.

In 2016, To joined Pegasus and made one appearance with the club.

Ahead of the 2017–18 season, To joined newly rebranded Dreams. He made his first appearance for the club on 24 September 2017 in a Hong Kong Senior Shield match against Rangers.

On 2 July 2019, Dreams announced To as one of several departures from the club.

On 7 July 2019, To signed with newly promoted club Happy Valley.

On 14 September 2021, To signed with newly promoted club HKFC following a successful trial.

On 8 August 2022, To joined Sham Shui Po. He left the club on 6 January 2023.

On 14 February 2023, To joined Suzuka Point Getters but was released at the end of the season without making an appearance.

== Match fixing scandal ==
On 15 February 2024, To was one of four defendants charged by ICAC for match-fixing. The trial is scheduled to begin on 10 November 2025. On 8 May 2026, To was acquitted.
