= Choy Tsz To =

Hong Kong footballer

Personal information
- Full name: Choy Tsz To
- Date of birth: 4 September 1999 (age 27)
- Place of birth: Hong Kong
- Height: 1.78 m (5 ft 10 in)
- Position: Goalkeeper

Youth career
- Pegasus

Senior career*
Years	Team	Apps	(Gls)
2016–2017	Resources Capital	6	(0)
2017–2024	Southern	8	(0)
2014–	South China	34	(0)
- * Club domestic league appearances and goals as of 1 July 2024

Choy Tsz To (Chinese: 蔡子濤; born 4 September 1999) is a former Hong Kong professional footballer who played as a goalkeeper.

== Club career ==
=== Southern ===
On 30 August 2017, Choy joined Southern.
