= Pang Tsz Kin =

Hong Kong footballer

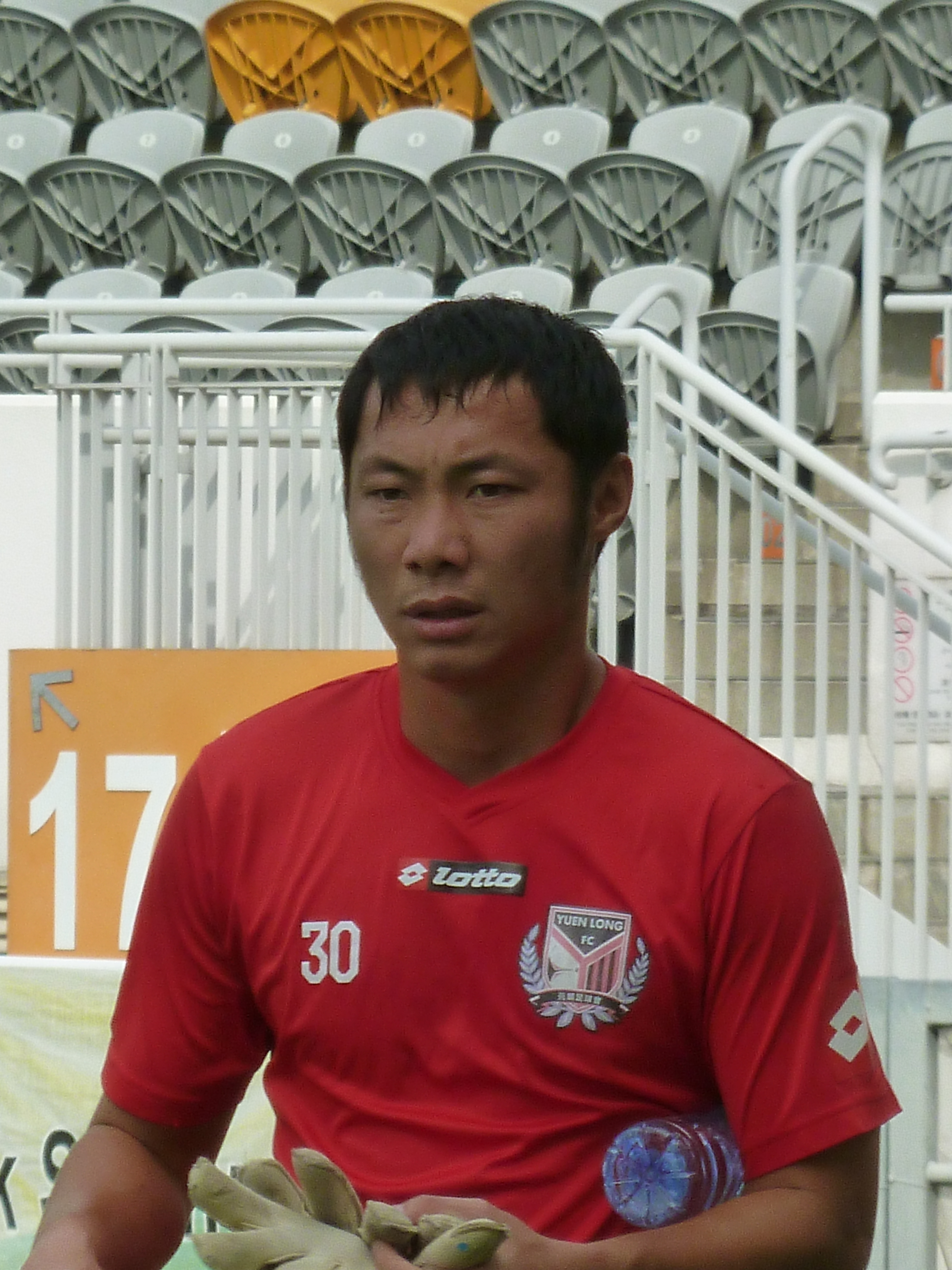

Personal information
- Full name: Pang Tsz Kin
- Date of birth: 16 December 1986 (age 39)
- Place of birth: Hong Kong
- Height: 1.78 m (5 ft 10 in)
- Position: Goalkeeper

Team information
- Current team: Tai Po (goalkeeping coach)

Senior career*
Years	Team	Apps	(Gls)
2009–2013	Tai Po	26	(0)
2013–2014	Happy Valley	1	(0)
2013–2015	Yuen Long	24	(0)
2015–2016	Metro Gallery	11	(0)
2016–2018	Yuen Long	24	(0)
2018–2019	Lee Man	8	(0)
2020–2024	WSE	3	(0)
2025–	WSE	16	(0)

Managerial career
- 2026–: Tai Po (goalkeeping coach)
- * Club domestic league appearances and goals as of 17 May 2026

Pang Tsz Kin (Chinese: 彭梓鍵; born 16 December 1986) is a Hong Kong former professional footballer who played as a goalkeeper. He is currently the goalkeeping coach of Hong Kong Premier League club Tai Po.

== Club career ==
=== Tai Po ===
Pang started his career at Tai Po, staying at the club for 4 seasons.

=== Happy Valley ===
Pang then signed for Happy Valley for the 2013–14 Hong Kong First Division League.

=== Yuen Long ===
After a season with Happy Valley, Pang signed for Yuen Long.

=== Metro Gallery ===
In 2015, Pang signed for Metro Gallery.

=== Yuen Long ===
Pang returned to Yuen Long after 2 years.

=== Lee Man ===
On 17 July 2018, Pang was announced as a Lee Man player ahead of the 2018–19 season. He made his competitive debut on 30 September 2018 against Hoi King with a win and a clean sheet.

== International career ==
Pang was part of the Hong Kong squad that took part in the 2017 Guangdong–Hong Kong Cup on 1 and 4 January 2017.

== Honours ==
Tai Po

- Hong Kong Senior Shield: 2012–13

Lee Man

- Hong Kong Sapling Cup: 2018–19

Yuen Long

- Hong Kong Senior Shield: 2017–18
