= Lai Lok Yin =

Hong Kong footballer

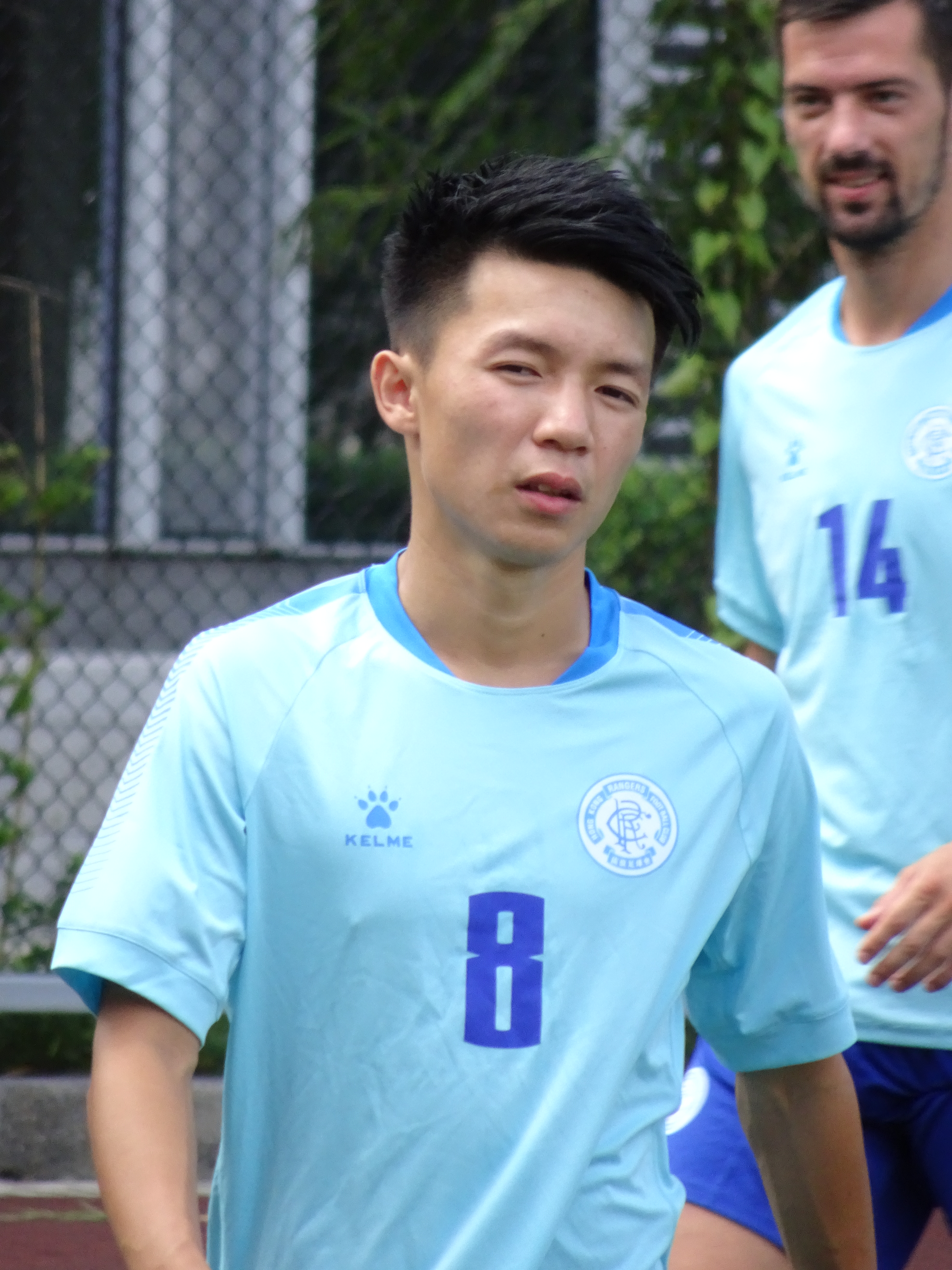

Personal information
- Full name: Lai Lok Yin
- Date of birth: 20 July 1995 (age 31)
- Place of birth: Hong Kong
- Height: 1.66 m (5 ft 5 in)
- Position: Winger

Youth career
- 2006-08: Dunstable Town

Senior career*
Years	Team	Apps	(Gls)
2008–11	Central & Western		
2011–2012	Double Flower		
2012–2015	Sun Source		
2015–2016	Dreams Metro Gallery	14	(0)
2016–2017	Pegasus	9	(1)
2017–2019	Rangers (HKG)	42	(7)
2019–2020	Metro Gallery	11	(3)
2020–2021	North District	1	(2)
2021–2023	Lun Lok		
2023	St. Joseph's	6	(1)
2023	Lun Lok		
2023–2024	St. Joseph's		
2024–2025	Lun Lok		

International career
	Hong Kong U–20	7	(6)
- * Club domestic league appearances and goals as of 8 December 2019

Lai Lok Yin (Chinese: 黎洛賢; born 20 July 1995 in Hong Kong) is a former Hong Kong professional footballer who played as a winger.

== Club career ==
In 2015, Lai joined Dreams Metro Gallery.

On 5 December 2015, Lai scored his first goal for Metro Gallery against Wong Tai Sin in a 2–0 victory.

Following the announcement of Metro Gallery's hiatus, Lai became a free agent. He joined Pegasus at the conclusion of his contract on 30 June 2016. On 11 June 2017, HK Pegasus chairperson Canny Leung revealed that Lai would be leaving the club.

He was not out of work for long as two weeks later, Lai signed with Rangers.
