= Chan Hoi Pak =

Hong Kong footballer

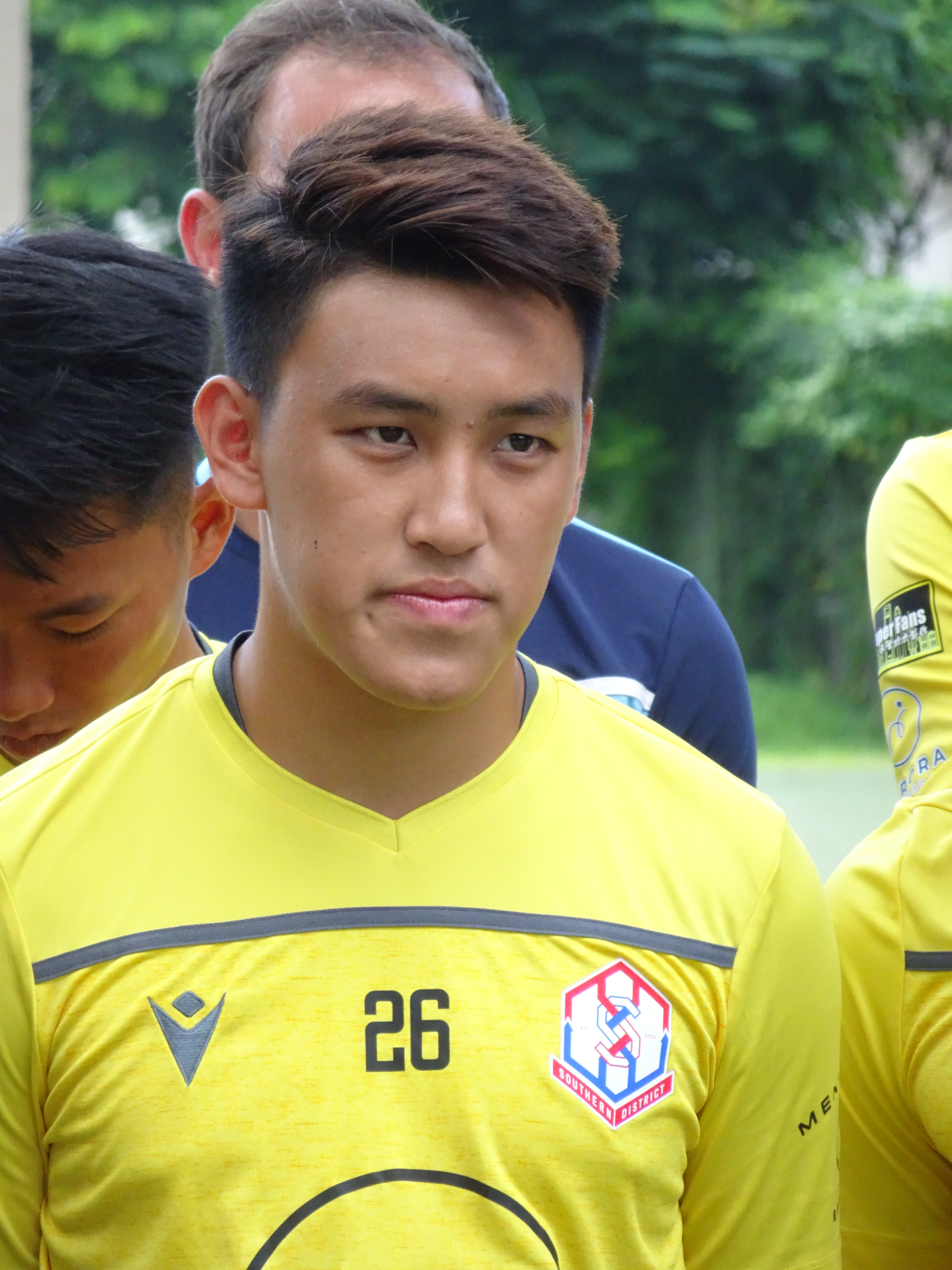

Personal information
- Full name: Paco Chan Hoi Pak
- Date of birth: 29 January 1999 (age 27)
- Place of birth: Hong Kong
- Height: 1.74 m (5 ft 9 in)
- Position: Left back

Team information
- Current team: Tai Po
- Number: 6

Youth career
- 2007–2012: South China
- 2012–2016: Pegasus
- 2016–2017: Freemen

Senior career*
Years	Team	Apps	(Gls)
2017–2026	Southern	74	(0)
2026–	Tai Po	6	(0)

International career^{‡}
2019	Hong Kong U-22	1	(0)
- * Club domestic league appearances and goals as of 21 November 2026 ‡ National team caps and goals as of 26 March 2019

Paco Chan Hoi Pak (Chinese: 陳凱柏; born 29 January 1999) is a Hong Kong professional footballer who currently plays as a left back for Hong Kong Premier League club Tai Po.

== Club career ==
On 30 August 2017, Chan joined Southern.

On 17 July 2026, Chan joined Tai Po.

== Honour ==
Southern

- Hong Kong Sapling Cup: 2022–23, 2024–25
