= Li Yat Chun =

Hong Kong footballer

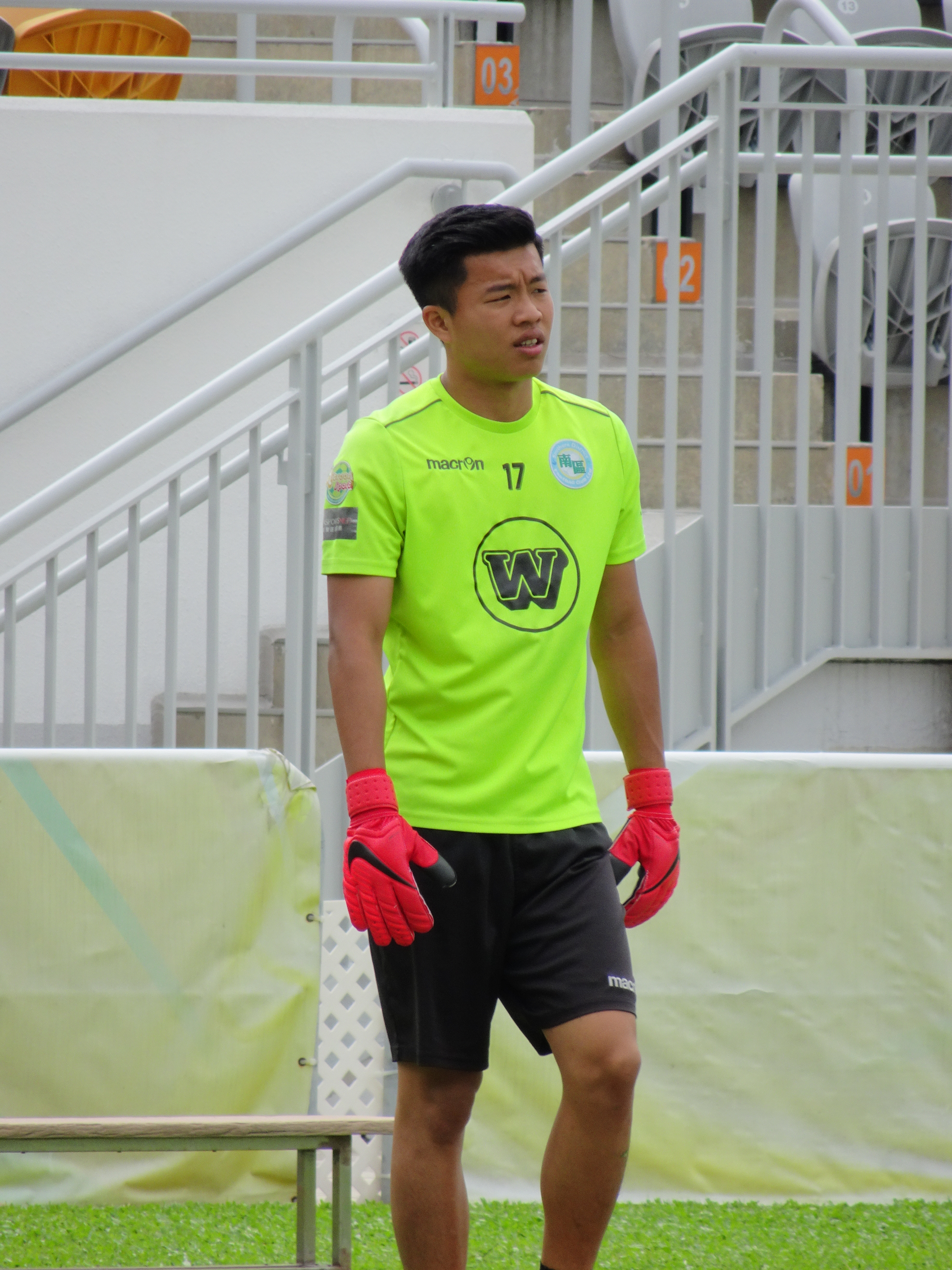
- Li with Southern in 2018

Personal information
- Full name: Li Yat Chun
- Date of birth: 8 December 1995 (age 30)
- Place of birth: Hong Kong
- Height: 1.80 m (5 ft 11 in)
- Position: Goalkeeper

Team information
- Current team: Eastern District
- Number: 23

Youth career
- 2008–2011: Fourway Rangers
- 2011–2014: South China
- 2014–2015: Eastern

Senior career*
Years	Team	Apps	(Gls)
2015–2017	Eastern	0	(0)
2015–2016	→ Dreams Metro Gallery (loan)	6	(0)
2016	→ Southern (loan)	0	(0)
2017–2020	Southern	8	(0)
2020–2021	Rangers (HKG)	5	(0)
2021–2023	Eastern District	22	(0)
2023–2024	Sham Shui Po	8	(0)
2024–2025	HKFC	4	(0)
2025–	Eastern District	4	(0)

International career
2015–2016	Hong Kong U-20		
- * Club domestic league appearances and goals as of 16 May 2026

Li Yat Chun (Chinese: 李溢晉; born 8 December 1995) is a Hong Kong professional footballer who currently plays as a goalkeeper for Hong Kong Premier League club Eastern District.

== Club career ==
In February 2015, Li was promoted to the first team of Eastern.

In July 2015, Li joined Dreams Metro Gallery on loan.

On 22 October 2020, Rangers announced the signing of Li. However, he was not retained after the season.

On 7 August 2023, Li joined Sham Shui Po.

In September 2024, Li joined HKFC.

On 20 August 2025, Li joined Hong Kong Premier League club Eastern District.

== Honours ==
Eastern

- Hong Kong Senior Shield: 2014–15
