= Cheng Chun Wang =

Hong Kong footballer

Personal information
- Full name: Ryan Cheng Chun Wang
- Date of birth: 11 February 2001 (age 25)
- Place of birth: Hong Kong
- Height: 1.68 m (5 ft 6 in)
- Position: Midfielder

Team information
- Current team: Sha Tin
- Number: 4

Youth career
- 2013–2019: Southern

Senior career*
| Years | Team | Apps | (Gls) |
| 2019–2022 | Southern | 12 | (0) |
| 2022–2023 | Lee Man | 1 | (0) |
| 2023–2024 | HK U23 | 17 | (0) |
| 2024 | Kowloon City | 5 | (0) |
| 2025–2026 | HKFC | 19 | (0) |
| 2026– | Sha Tin | 6 | (0) |

International career^{‡}
| 2019 | Hong Kong U-19 | 5 | (0) |
| 2021–2023 | Hong Kong U-22 | 9 | (0) |
- * Club domestic league appearances and goals as of 7 November 2026 ‡ National team caps and goals as of 7 October 2023

Ryan Cheng Chun Wang (Chinese: 鄭進泓; born 11 February 2001) is a Hong Kong professional footballer who currently plays as a midfielder for Hong Kong Premier League club Sha Tin.

== Club career ==
=== Southern ===
Cheng was a youth product of Southern. He was promoted to the first team in the 2019–20 season, which he made 5 league appearances in his first season.

On 17 July 2022, Cheng left the club.

=== Lee Man ===
On 25 July 2022, Cheng joined Lee Man.

=== HK U23 ===
On 6 July 2023, Cheng joined HK U23.

=== Kowloon City ===
On 18 July 2024, Cheng joined Kowloon City.

=== HKFC ===
On 4 January 2025, Cheng joined HKFC.

=== Sha Tin ===
On 8 August 2026, Cheng joined Sha Tin.
