= Lau Ho Lam =

Hong Kong footballer

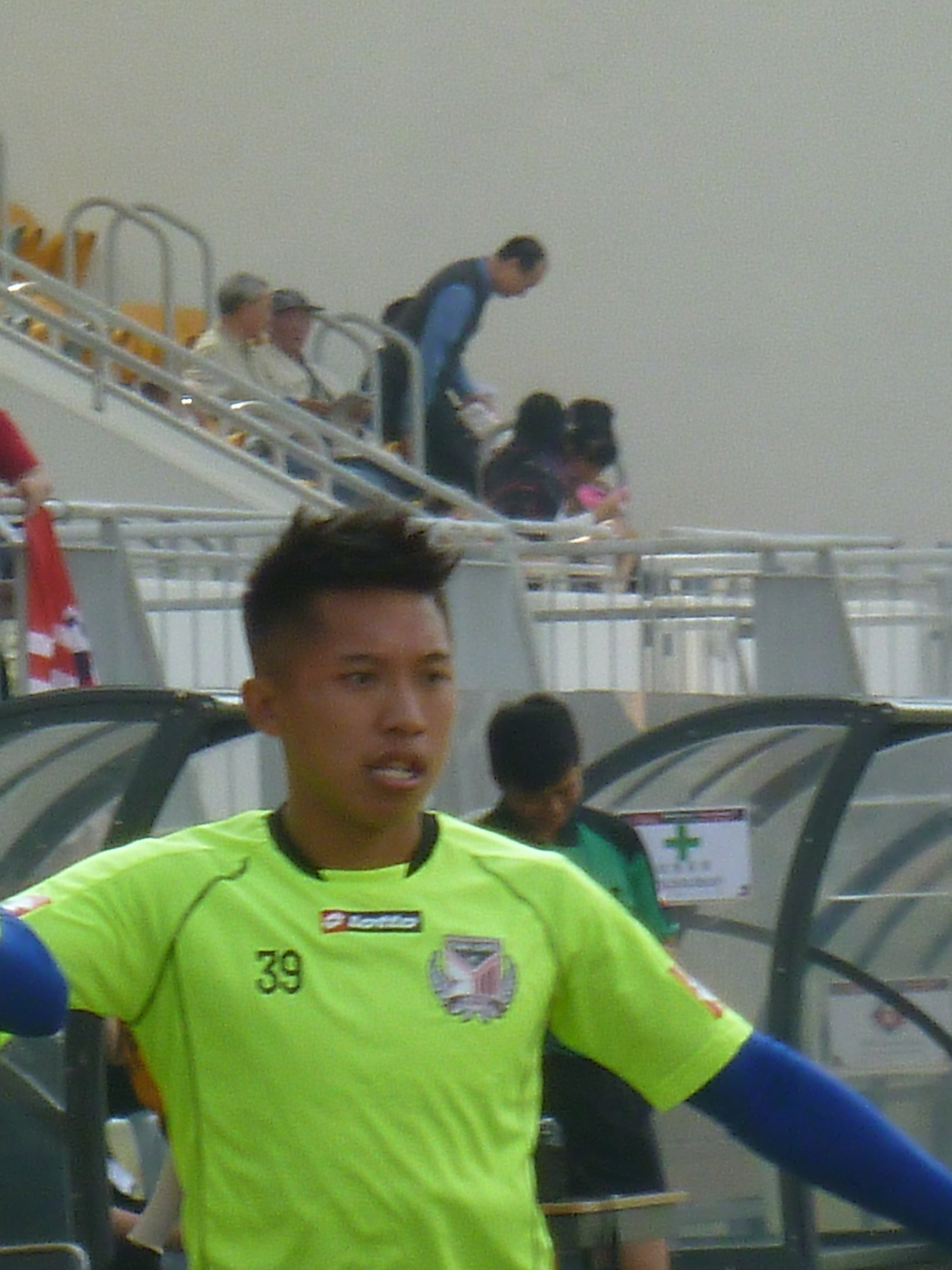

Personal information
- Full name: Lau Ho Lam
- Date of birth: 22 January 1993 (age 33)
- Place of birth: Hong Kong
- Height: 1.68 m (5 ft 6 in)
- Position: Midfielder

Youth career
- Tuen Mun

Senior career*
Years	Team	Apps	(Gls)
2008–2012	Tuen Mun	6	(1)
2012–2016	Eastern	17	(0)
2014–2015	→ Wong Tai Sin (loan)	6	(0)
2015–2016	→ Dream Metro Gallery (loan)	11	(0)
2016–2018	Yuen Long	31	(2)
2018–2020	Eastern	11	(1)
2019–2020	→ Southern (loan)	12	(1)
2020–2021	Southern	5	(0)
2021–2022	Sai Kung	10	(7)
2022–2023	Sham Shui Po	17	(0)
2023–2025	Central & Western	36	(4)
2025–	Kui Tan	20	(3)
- * Club domestic league appearances and goals as of 31 May 2026

Lau Ho Lam (Chinese: 劉浩霖; born 22 January 1993) is a Hong Kong former professional footballer who played as a midfielder.

== Club career ==
=== Tuen Mun ===
Lau started his career at Tuen Mun in the Third District Division.

=== Eastern ===
After few disappointing seasons at Tuen Mun, Lau signed for Eastern in 2012 in the Second Division. He failed to make any appearances after the club was promoted to the First Division in 2013.

=== Wong Tai Sin ===
He then went on to sign for Wong Tai Sin in 2014 where he finally made his first HKPL debut.

=== Metro Gallery ===
He signed for Metro Gallery in 2015.

=== Yuen Long ===
He played for Yuen Long where he scored his first league goal in his career. While with the club, he won the 2017–18 Senior Shield, capturing the trophy against his parent club in the final.

=== Southern ===
After finding playing time hard to come by at Eastern, Lau agreed to a loan to Southern for the 2019–20 season. He officially joined the club a year later.

=== Sham Shui Po ===
In August 2022, Lau returned to top flight and joined Sham Shui Po.

== International career ==
Lau was part of the Hong Kong squad which took part in the 2017 Guangdong–Hong Kong Cup on 1 and 4 January 2017.

== Honours ==
Eastern

- Hong Kong FA Cup: 2013–14

Yuen Long

- Hong Kong Senior Shield: 2017–18
